= Treaties to recognise the Spanish American independence =

Throughout the 19th century Spain made treaties of peace and recognition with each of the states established from its former colonies in Spanish America. The process was long drawn out, only being completed in 1904.

== Background ==
After the Cortes of Cádiz – which served as a parliamentary Regency after Ferdinand VII was deposed – was established in 1810, many Spanish Empire territories decided to declare independence. When Ferdinand VII returned to the throne, he refused to accept these declarations and promised that he would retake all the territories, by force if necessary. There were diplomatic negotiations during the Trienio Liberal (1820-1823) but they were quashed by the return of absolutism. Ferdinand VII died in 1833, ending all military projects to reconquer Spanish America. In 1834 the Regnant Queen Isabella II of Spain decided that times had changed, that a more modern approach was needed, and started consulting other members of her government. On December 16, 1836 the Congress of Spain issued a decree authorizing the Spanish Government to renounce its territorial and sovereign claims over its domains in continental Americas, by concluding treaties with each of the states of Spanish America. Throughout the 19th century Spain made treaties of peace and recognition with each of newborn states. The process was less conflictive than the government thought, but several diplomatic hurdles meant that 68 years passed until the last treaty was signed.

== Chronology ==
The table lists the signing dates, not the ratification dates.

Treaties to recognise the Spanish American independence
| Year | Date | Country | Hispanic Americans | Spain |
|---|---|---|---|---|
| 1837 | November 14 | Mexico | President José Justo Corro plenipotentiary Miguel Santa María | Queen María Cristina de Borbón, Queen consort of Spain, widow of Fernando VII plenipotentiary José María Calatrava |
| 1841 | | Ecuador | President Juan José Flores plenipotentiary Pedro Gual | Queen María Cristina de Borbón, Queen consort of Spain, widow of Fernando VII plenipotentiary Evaristo Pérez de Castro |
| 1845 | | Chile | President Manuel Bulnes plenipotentiary José Manuel Borgoño | Queen Isabella II of Spain plenipotentiary Luis González Bravo |
| 1846 | | Venezuela | President Carlos Soublette plenipotentiary Alejo Fortique | Queen Isabella II of Spain plenipotentiary Ramón María Narváez; Plenipotentiary Francisco Martínez de la Rosa |
| 1850 | | Costa Rica | President Juan Rafael Mora Porras plenipotentiary Felipe Molina | Queen Isabella II of Spain; Cabinet council Ramón María Narváez plenipotentiary Pedro José Pidal |
| 1851 | | Nicaragua | Presidente Norberto Ramírez plenipotentiary José de Marcoleta | Queen Isabella II of Spain cabinet council Ramón María Narváez plenipotentiary Pedro José Pidal |
| 1855 | | Dominican Republic | President Ignacio María González plenipotentiary Manuel Joaquín Delmonte | President del Poder Ejecutivo de la República Española Francisco Serrano; Presidente del Consejo de Ministros Práxedes Mateo Sagasta plenipotentiary Juan Gutiérrez de la Concha |
| 1861 | February (Note: Signed in July 21, 1847, but internal instability in Bolivia prevented its ratification until 1861) | Bolivia | President José Ballivián plenipotentiary José María Linares | Queen Isabella II of Spain plenipotentiary Joaquín Francisco Pacheco |
| 1864 | | Guatemala | President Rafael Carrera y Turcios plenipotentiary Felipe del Barrio Larrazábal | Queen Isabella II of Spain; Cabinet Council and plenipotentiary Manuel Pando Fernández de Pinedo |
| 1863 | September 21 (Note: First peace treaty in June 24, 1829, followed by a distancing. In 1845 Spain tried to reestablish relationships, but was unsuccessful until April 29, 1857 when they signed a peace treaty and a consular treaty. They were modified with a July 9, 1959 treaty. Disagreements between the Argentine Confederation and Buenos Aires prompted new negotiations, and normal relationship were not established until the 1863 treaty (Pereira, 2004)) | Argentina | President Bartolomé Mitre plenipotentiary Mariano Balcarce | Queen Isabella II of Spain plenipotentiary Manuel Pando Fernández de Pinedo |
| 1866 | | El Salvador | President Francisco Dueñas plenipotentiary Juan Víctor Herrán | Queen Isabella II of Spain; Presidente del Consejo de Ministros Leopoldo O'Donnell plenipotentiary Manuel Bermúdez de Castro y Díez |
| 1879 | August 14 (Note: A preliminary peace treaty had been signed in January 27, 1867 (Pereira, 2004)) | Peru | President Mariano Ignacio Prado plenipotentiary Juan Mariano de Goyeneche y Gamio | King Alfonso XII of Spain; Presidente del Consejo de Ministros Arsenio Martínez-Campos plenipotentiary El I marqués de Molins |
| 1881 | | Colombia | Presidente Rafael Núñez; Chancellor and plenipotentiary Luis Carlos Rico | King Alfonso XII of Spain; Presidente del Consejo de Ministros Antonio Cánovas del Castillo plenipotentiary El I marqués de Molins |
| 1882 | (Note: Paraguay asked that part of an article was removed, it referred to the reclamations of the subjects of both states. (Pereira, 2004)) | Paraguay | President Cándido Bareiro plenipotentiary Carlos Saguier | King Alfonso XII of Spain; Presidente del Consejo de Ministros Antonio Cánovas del Castillo plenipotentiary Francisco Otín y Mesía |
| 1882 | (Note: A treaty was signed in 1841, but it was not ratified and it caused great instability. A new treaty was signed in March 26, 1845, but was replaced by a new treaty in 1846. In June 25, 1870 a consular treaty was signed. In July 19, 1870 the definitive treaty was signed, but it was not ratified until 1882. (Pereira, 2004)) | Uruguay | President Lorenzo Batlle plenipotentiary Adolfo Rodríguez | Regente del Reino Francisco Serrano; Presidente del Consejo de Ministros Juan Prim plenipotentiary Carlos Creus y Camps |
| 1894 | November 17 | Honduras | Presidente Policarpo Bonilla plenipotentiary José Diego Gámez | Regente Maria Christina of Austria Queen consort of Spain; Presidente del Consejo de Ministros Práxedes Mateo Sagasta plenipotentiary Julio de Arellano |
| 1903 | | Cuba | | Spanish possession until the Spanish–American War. It remained under the control of the United States until May 1902, when it became independent. Diplomatic relationships were established, but no formal treaty was signed. |
| 1904 | May 10 (Note: Panama seceded from Colombia in 1903. This is the date of the recognition of Panama by Spain. (Pereira, 2004)) | Panama | | King Alfonso XIII of Spain; President of Cabinet Council Antonio Maura |
