= Juan de la Pezuela y Cevallos =

Spanish politician, soldier and writer

The Most Excellent Juan de la Pezuela
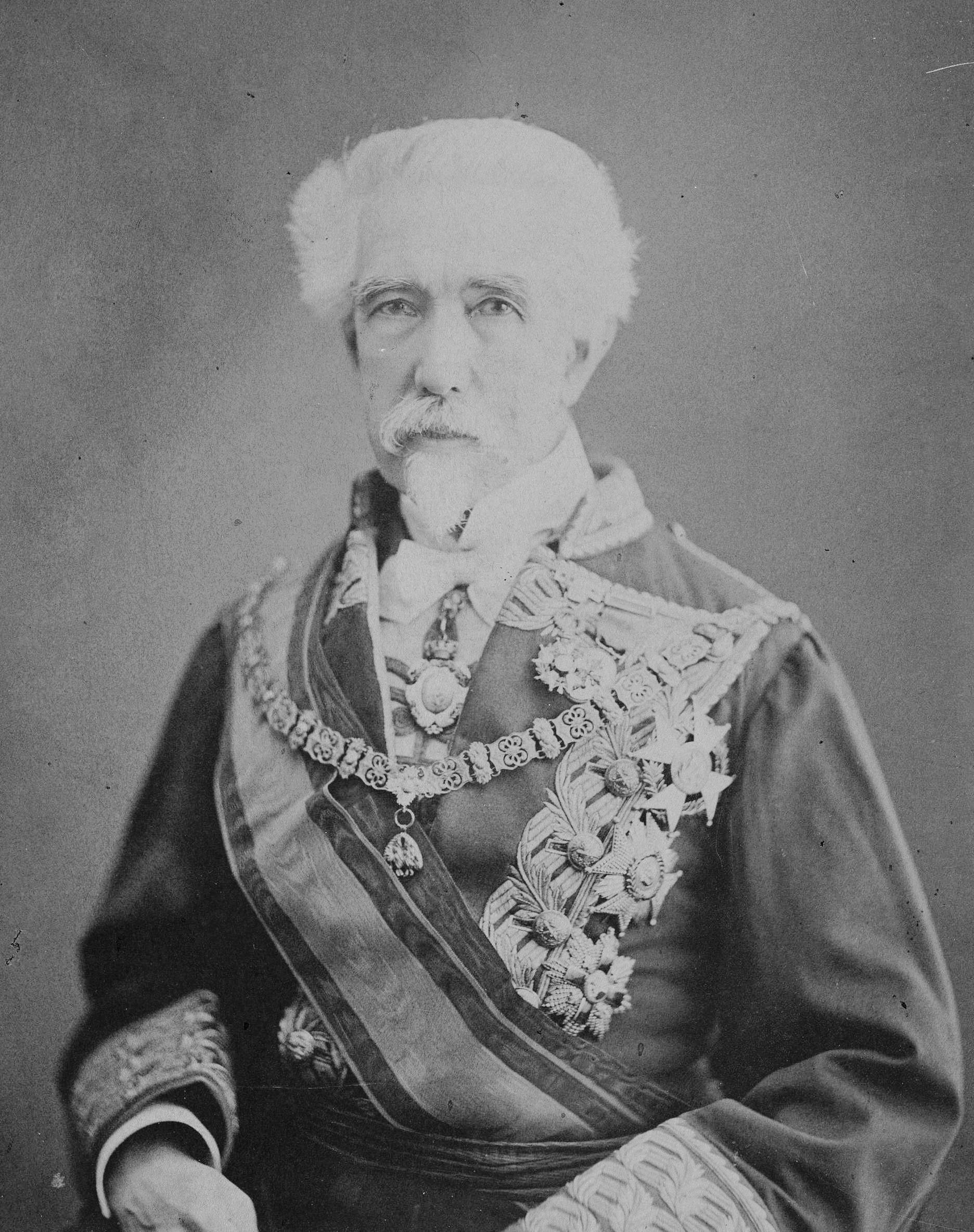
- c. 1880
- Born: Juan González de la Pezuela y Cevallos; 16 May 1810; Lima, Peru
- Died: 1 November 1906 (aged 96); Madrid, Spain

Minister of the Navy, Commerce, Overseas Governance of Spain
- In office 16 March – 3 April 1846
- Monarch: Isabella II
- Prime Minister: Ramón María Narváez
- Preceded by: Juan Bautista Topete y Viaña
- Succeeded by: Jorge Pérez Lasso de la Vega

Governor of Puerto Rico
- In office 12 September 1848 – 23 April 1851
- Monarch: Isabella II
- Prime Minister: Ramón María Narváez; Serafín María de Sotto; Juan Bravo Murillo
- Minister of Overseas: Mariano Roca de Togores; José María Bustillo Barreda
- Preceded by: Juan Prim
- Succeeded by: Enrique de España y Taberner

Governor of Cuba
- In office 3 December 1853 – 21 September 1854
- Monarch: Isabella II
- Prime Minister: Francisco Lersundi; Luis José Sartorius
- Minister of Overseas: Francisco Lersundi; Luis José Sartorius
- Preceded by: Valentín Cañedo
- Succeeded by: José Gutiérrez de la Concha

Seat a of the Real Academia Española
- In office 25 February 1847 – 1 November 1906
- Preceded by: Seat established
- Succeeded by: Antonio Hernández Fajarnés

Director of the Real Academia Española
- In office 2 December 1875 – 1 November 1906
- Preceded by: Mariano Roca de Togores
- Succeeded by: Alejandro Pidal y Mon

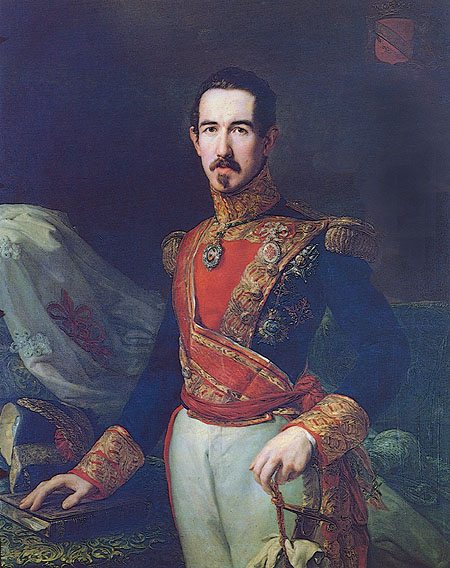
1847 Portrait of Juan de la Pezuela by Vicente López Portaña

Juan González de la Pezuela y Cevallos, (Lima, 16 May 1810 - Madrid, 1 November 1906), I Count of Cheste, I Marquis de la Pezuela, I viscount of Ayala, Grandee of Spain, was a conservative Spanish politician, soldier and writer.

== Life ==
He was the second son of Joaquín de la Pezuela, 1st Marquess of Viluma and Angela de Cevallos Y Olarria. His elder brother was Manuel de la Pezuela, 2nd Marquess of Viluma.

He lived in Peru until 1821. In 1833 he had the rank of a captain and fought in the First Carlist War for the Christinos, distinguishing himself in the battle of Cheste. During the government of Baldomero Espartero, he was involved in a military conspiracy of supporters of Maria Christina, which tried to seize power in Madrid on 7 October 1841, but failed.

After two years in exile, he became a member of the Cortes, and in 1846, he was appointed Minister of Navy for a few weeks, then in 1848, he became Captain General of Madrid.

Later during the same year, he was appointed Governor of Puerto Rico, as a successor to Juan Prim. He held this position until 1851. He founded the Royal Academy of Belles Letters in Puerto Rico, and banned the new dance Merengue for its "corrupting influence".
Between 1853 and 1854, he was Governor of Cuba. He then returned to Spain to serve as Captain General of Catalonia and Captain general of the Army from October 1867.

During the 1868 Revolution, he defended the monarchy of Isabella II of Spain, and as a consequence of the defeat, he was then marginalized from important positions under the reign of Amadeo I and under the First Republic. After the rise to the throne of King Alfonso XII in 1874, he was rehabilitated.

Pezuela was elected to seat a of the Real Academia Española, he took up his seat on 2 December 1875. He became its director on 2 December 1875, and in the same year, he was awarded the Order of the Golden Fleece.

He dedicated the last 30 years of his life to literature, and translated several works, including the Portuguese epic poem Os Lusíadas of Luís de Camões, and the Divine Comedy of Dante.

== Sources ==
- Real Academia de la Historia
- Enciclopedia catalana
- Senado de España
