= Manuel de la Pezuela, 2nd Marquess of Viluma =

Spanish noble and politician

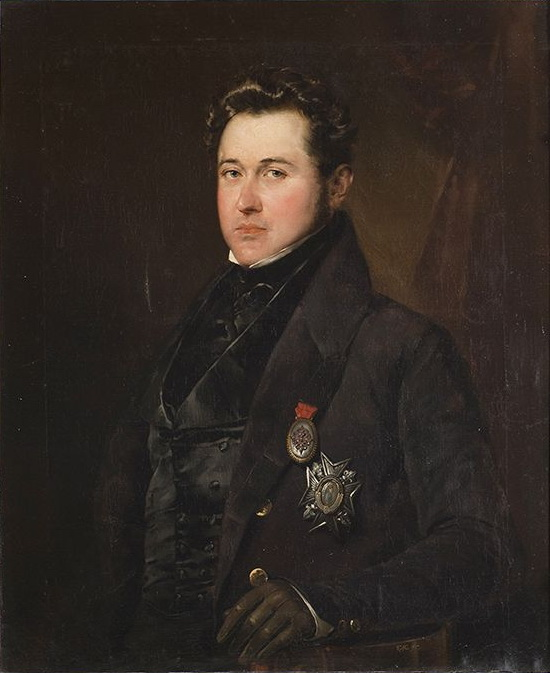
The Marquess of Viluma (1837) by Federico de Madrazo

Manuel de la Pezuela y Ceballos, 2nd Marquess of Viluma (8 January 1797, in A Coruña – 20 October 1872, in Madrid) was a Spanish noble and politician who served as Minister of State in 1844.

He was son of Joaquín de la Pezuela, 1st Marquess of Viluma, viceroy of Peru, and of Ángela de Ceballos y Olarria. His younger brother was Juan de la Pezuela y Cevallos.
He served as Plenipotentiary Minister in London between 13 February and 2 May 1844.

Political offices
Preceded by Luis González-Bravo	Minister of State; 3 May 1844 – 1 July 1844	Succeeded by Ramón María Narváez; Acting
