= Mariano Roca de Togores, 1st Marquess of Molins =

Spanish noble, politician, and writer

The Most Excellent Mariano Roca de Togores 1st Marquess of Molins GE
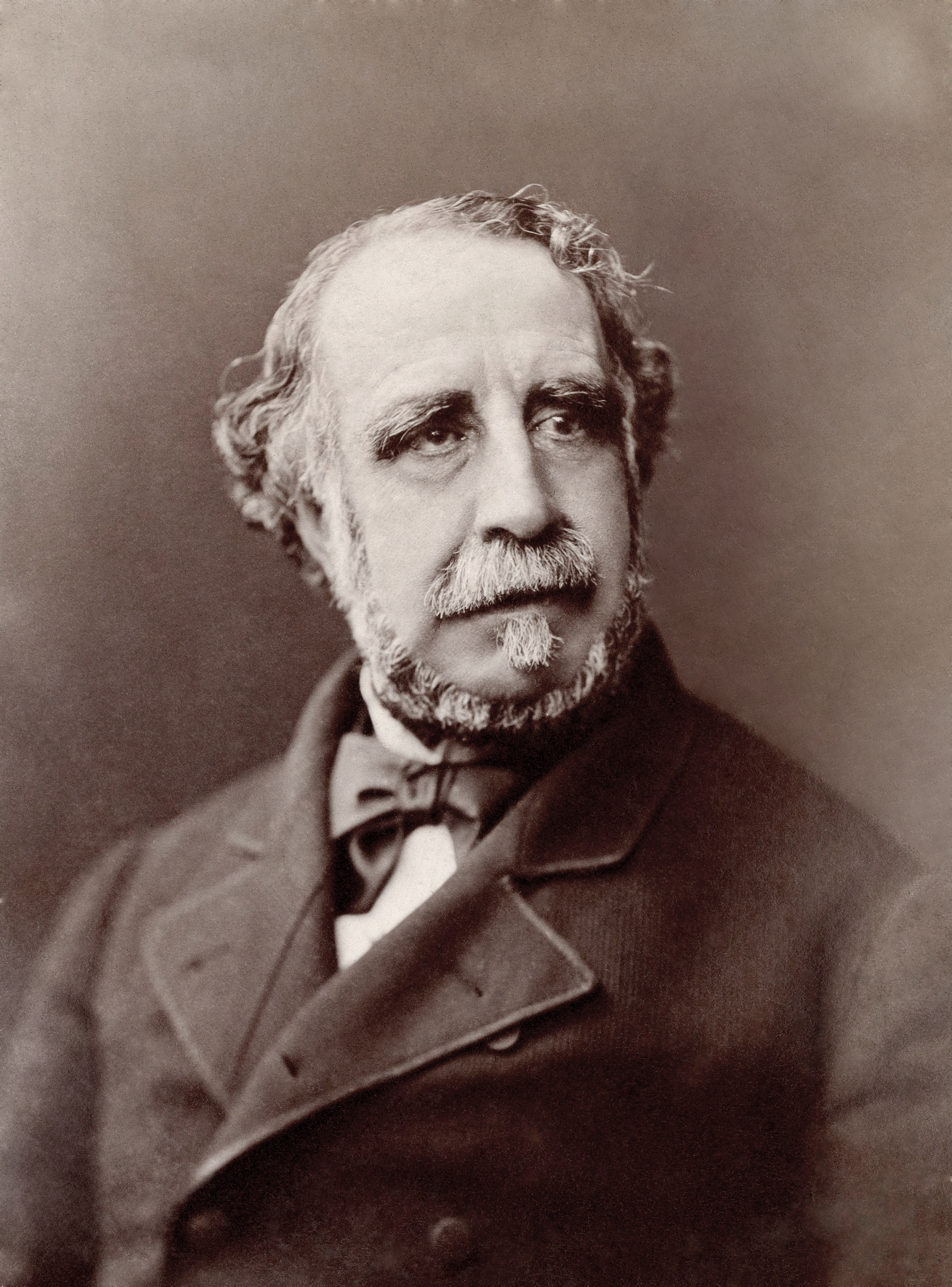
- Portrait by Nadar

Minister of State
- In office 10 March 1879 – 16 May 1879
- Monarch: Alfonso XII
- Prime Minister: Arsenio Martínez Campos
- Preceded by: Francisco de Borja Queipo de Llano
- Succeeded by: Carlos O'Donnell

Seat K of the Real Academia Española
- In office 1 January 1841 – 4 September 1889
- Preceded by: Juan Bautista Arriaza
- Succeeded by: Francisco Silvela

Director the Real Academia Española
- In office 27 June 1865 – December 1875
- Preceded by: Ángel de Saavedra
- Succeeded by: Juan de la Pezuela y Cevallos

Personal details
- Born: Mariano Roca de Togores y Carrasco; 17 August 1812 Albacete, Spain
- Died: 4 September 1889 (aged 77) Lequeitio (Biscay), Spain

Mariano Roca de Togores y Carrasco, 1st Marquess of Molins Grandee of Spain and 1st Viscount of Rocamora (17 August 1812, in Albacete, Spain – 4 September 1889, in Lequeitio, Biscay, Spain) was a Spanish noble, politician and writer who served as Minister of State during the reign of Alfonso XII. His title takes its name from the locality of Molins, Orihuela.

Roca de Togores was elected to seat K of the Real Academia Española, he took up his seat on 1 January 1841. He was the director of the royal academy between 1865 and 1875.

Political offices
Preceded by The Count of Toreno	Minister of State; 10 March 1879 – 16 May 1879	Succeeded by The Duke of Tetuan
