= Serafín María de Sotto, 3rd Count of Clonard =

Spanish military historian and politician

The Most Excellent The Count of Clonard
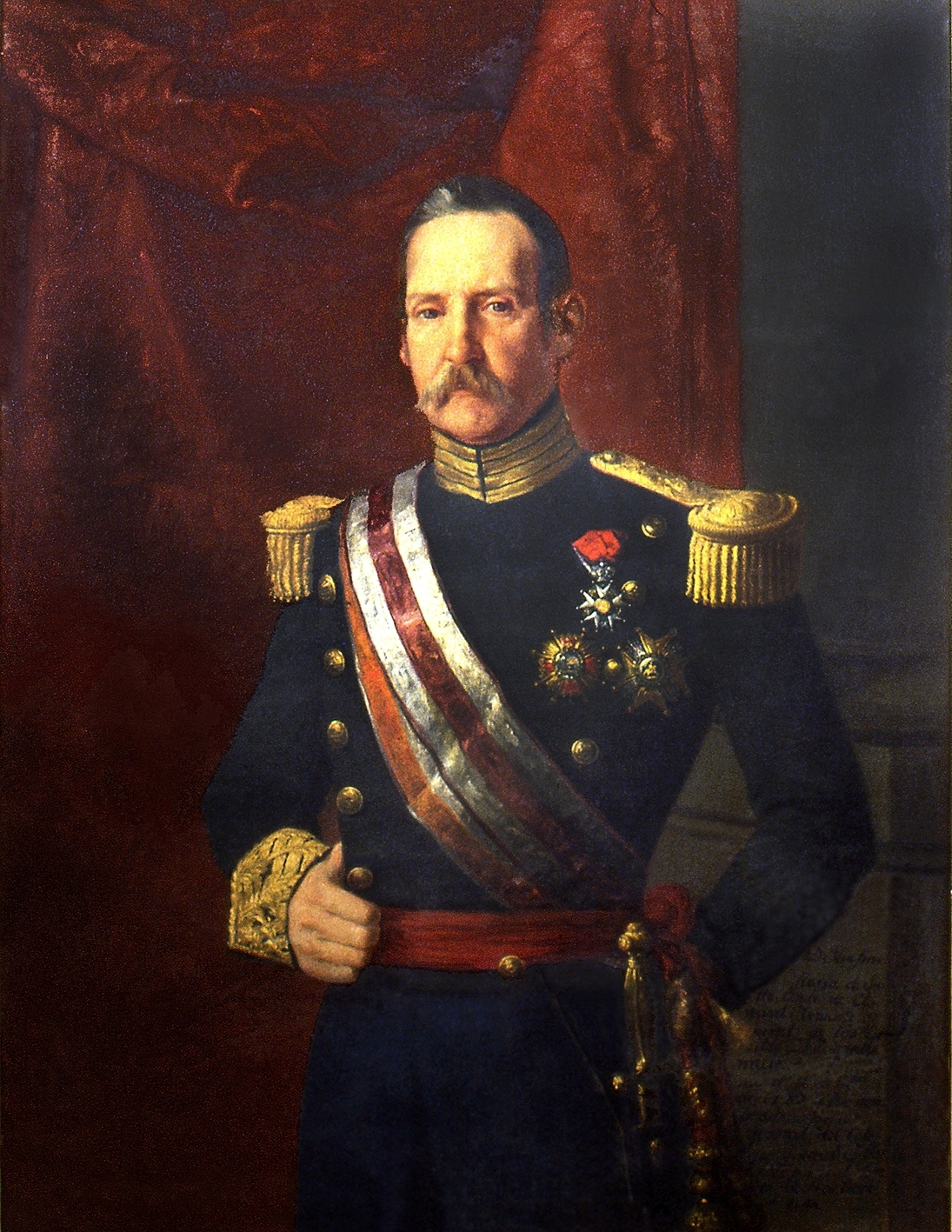

Prime Minister of Spain
- In office 19 October – 20 October 1849
- Monarch: Isabella II
- Preceded by: Ramon Maria Narvaez
- Succeeded by: Juan Bravo Murillo

Minister of War of Spain
- In office 14 April – 19 July 1840
- Monarch: Isabella II
- Regent: Maria Christina of the Two Sicilies
- Prime Minister: Evaristo Pérez de Castro
- Preceded by: Fernando de Norzaragay (as acting)
- Succeeded by: Valentín Ferraz
- In office 19 October – 20 October 1849
- Monarch: Isabella II
- Prime Minister: Himself
- Preceded by: Francisco de Paula Figueras
- Succeeded by: Francisco de Paula y Figueras

Personal details
- Born: Serafín María de Sotto y Abbach

Don Serafín María de Sotto y Abbach, 3rd Count of Clonard and 5th Marquis of la Granada (12 October 1793, in Barcelona, Spain – 23 February 1862, in Madrid, Spain) was a Spanish noble, politician, writer and statesman who served as Prime Minister of Spain for one day in October 1849. Elder son of Raimundo de Sotto, 2nd Count of Clonard and Ramona Abbach, 4th Marquise of la Granada, he was of Irish patrilineal descent, a descendant of John Sutton, 1st Baron Dudley. In Spain, the family name had been Hispanicized as Sotto.

== Works ==
- Memoria para la Historia de las tropas de la Casa Real de España (1824).
- Memoria histórica de las academias militares de España (1847).
- Historia orgánica de las armas de Infantería y Caballería españolas (1851–1859).
- Álbum de la Infantería española (1861).
- Álbum de la Caballería española (1861).

Political offices
Preceded by The Duke of Valencia	Prime Minister of Spain; 19 October 1849 – 20 October 1849	Succeeded by The Duke of Valencia
Spanish nobility
Preceded by Raimundo de Sotto	Count of Clonard; 27 March 1823 – 23 February 1862	Succeeded by Raimundo de Sotto
Italian nobility
Preceded by Ramona Abbach	Marquis of la Granada; 11 May 1831 – 23 February 1862	Succeeded by Raimundo de Sotto
