= Luis González Bravo =

19th-century Spanish politician and diplomat

The Most Excellent Luis González Bravo
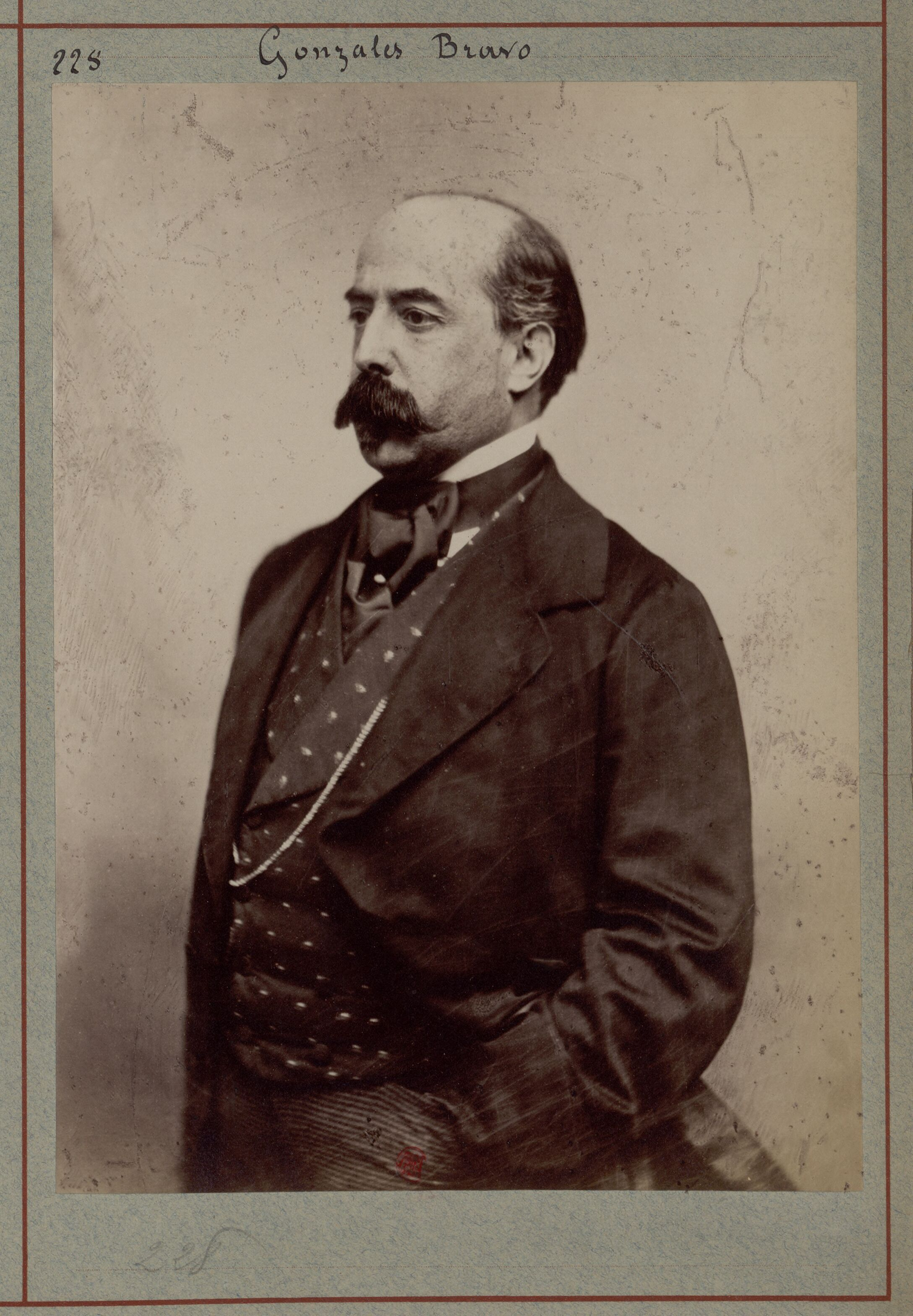

Prime Minister of Spain
- In office 5 December 1843 – 3 May 1844
- Monarch: Isabella II
- Preceded by: Salustiano de Olózaga
- Succeeded by: Ramon Maria Narvaez
- In office 23 April 1868 – 19 September 1868
- Monarch: Isabella II
- Preceded by: Ramon Maria Narvaez
- Succeeded by: Jose Gutierrez de la Concha

Minister of State
- In office 29 November 1843 – 3 May 1844
- Preceded by: Salustiano de Olózaga
- Succeeded by: Manuel de la Pezuela, 2nd Marquis of Viluma

Minister of Home Affairs
- In office 16 September 1864 – 21 June 1865
- In office 10 July 1866 – 20 September 1868

Seat C of the Real Academia Española
- In office 1 March 1863 – 1 September 1871
- Preceded by: Francisco Martínez de la Rosa
- Succeeded by: Antonio de Benavides

Personal details
- Born: Luis González Bravo y López de Arjona; 8 July 1811 Cádiz, Spain
- Died: 1 September 1871 (aged 60) Biarritz, France
- Party: Moderate Party
- Other political affiliations: Traditionalist Communion
- Education: University of Alcalá
- Occupation: Politician

Luis González Bravo y López de Arjona (8 July 1811 – 1 September 1871) was a Spanish politician, diplomat, intellectual, speaker, author, arts mentor, arts promoter and journalist. He graduated from law school and served twice as prime minister of Spain (president of the Council of Ministers), in 1843–1844 and in 1868. During his first term, his government officially recognized Chile as an independent state.

He held other important offices, such as once serving as minister of State and twice as minister of Home Affairs. He was appointed ambassador of Spain to the United Kingdom in Queen Victoria's rule, and ambassador of Spain to Portugal. He was a member of the Moderate Party, and occupied three times the post of Spanish Congressman for Cádiz, Madrid, Jaén, Málaga and the Canary Islands. He was acting minister of Justice for five days. He was head of the Spanish civil troops "Milicia Nacional". He was Knight of the Order of the Golden Fleece and Knight of the Order of Charles III (of King Charles III of Spain, Carlos III). He founded four newspapers in Spain, and was the noted Spanish poet Gustavo Adolfo Bécquer's benefactor and patron.

== Independence of Chile and Chile Peace Treaty ==
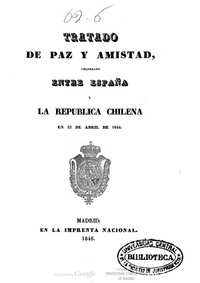
Chile and Spain Independence and Peace Treaty, 1844

On 25 April 1844, as Prime Minister and Minister of State simultaneously, President Luis González Bravo, together with Queen Isabella II of Spain made the peace negotiations and Treaty to recognise the Spanish American Independence of Chile as a country, for its official recognition by the Spanish Kingdom, called the Tratado de Paz y Amistad, in the government of President of Chile Manuel Bulnes. The signing plenipotentiaries were Luis González Bravo for Spain, and General José Manuel Borgoño for Chile.

It was the first Latin American independence peace treaty signed in Queen Isabella II's government since her proclamation of accession to the throne.

== Anti-monarchist revolution and exile ==
President Luis González Bravo was the first stable Prime Minister of Queen Isabella II's effective kingdom starting in 1843, and also her kingdom's last Prime Minister, 25 years later in 1868. Prime Minister Luis González Bravo was one of the few politicians who remained consistently faithful to Queen Isabella II throughout her ruling years, standing by her from the beginning of her effective monarchy, to the last days of her reign in 1868.

In September 1868, however, upon facing the first battle of the revolution, he advised Queen Isabella II to substitute him in the country's presidency for an experienced army general as Prime Minister, to better fight the ready to strike armed forces organized against her government. The Queen named Captain José Gutiérrez de la Concha as Prime Minister, who only lasted eleven days in power, from 19 September to 30 September 1868, his troops being defeated on 28 September, when the anti-monarchical revolution took over the country. Queen Isabella II and Prime Minister González Bravo were offered exile with their spouses and children in France by Emperor Napoleon III.

The Queen was exiled in Paris, where she died in 1904. Luis González Bravo lived in Biarritz with his wife and two daughters, and died there from coronary heart disease in 1871. In France, as a last resort to rescue and preserve the Bourbon monarchy in Spain in face of the anti-monarchist revolutionary takeover and Queen Isabella II's exile, he supported the Carlists two years before his death. Months later, in 1870, Queen Isabella II abdicated her crown in favour of her first son, Alfonso, so as to perpetuate the House of Bourbon dynasty in Spain, which came back into power in 1874 with him leading the Spanish Monarchy Restoration.

== Works, journalism and intellectual cademies ==
Luis González Bravo established several newspapers in Spain, including El Guirigay (1837), La Legalidad, El Contemporáneo (1860), and Los Tiempos. He was also a columnist for the newspapers El Español and El Eco del Comercio. He provided financial and professional support to the poet Gustavo Adolfo Bécquer and his brother, the painter Valeriano Bécquer.

In his youth he wrote the play Intrigar para morir ("To Intrigue to Die"). In 1835 he and Eugenio Moreno wrote the historical novel in four volumes Ramir Sanchez de Guzman, Año de 1072. He was a member of the Ateneo de Madrid (Athenæum of Madrid) since its foundation, and member of the Spanish Royal Academy of Moral and Political Sciences. He became a "C seat" Member of the Real Academia Española de la Lengua (Royal Academy of the Spanish Language) in 1863. Luis González Bravo is considered one of the best Spanish public speakers and orators of all time.

Political offices
Preceded by Salustiano de Olózaga	Minister of State; 29 November 1843 – 3 May 1844	Succeeded by The Marquis of Viluma
Preceded by Salustiano de Olózaga	President of Spain / Prime Minister of Spain; 5 December 1843 – 3 May 1844	Succeeded by Ramón María Narváez

Preceded by Ramón María Narváez	President of Spain / Prime Minister of Spain; 23 April 1868 – 19 September 1868	Succeeded by President for 11 last days of Queen Isabella II's kingdom: José Gutiérrez de la Concha
