= Espeja =

- Municipality
- Coat of arms

- Location in Salamanca

- Location in Spain
- Coordinates: 40°33′49″N 6°43′0″W
- Country: Spain
- Community: Castile and León
- Province: Salamanca
- Comarca: Comarca de Ciudad Rodrigo
- Subcomarca: Campo de Argañán

Government
  - Mayor: Clotilde Muñoz Cañada (People's Party)

Area
  - Total: 98 km^{2} (38 sq mi)
- Elevation: 697 m (2,287 ft)

Population (2025-01-01)
  - Total: 212
  - Density: 2.2/km^{2} (5.6/sq mi)
- Time zone: UTC+1 (CET)
  - Summer (DST): UTC+2 (CEST)
- Postal code: 37497

Espeja is a municipality located in the province of Salamanca, Castile and León, Spain.
