= Salustiano de Olózaga y Almandoz =

Spanish politician, diplomat, lawyer and writer

The Most Excellent Salustiano de Olózaga
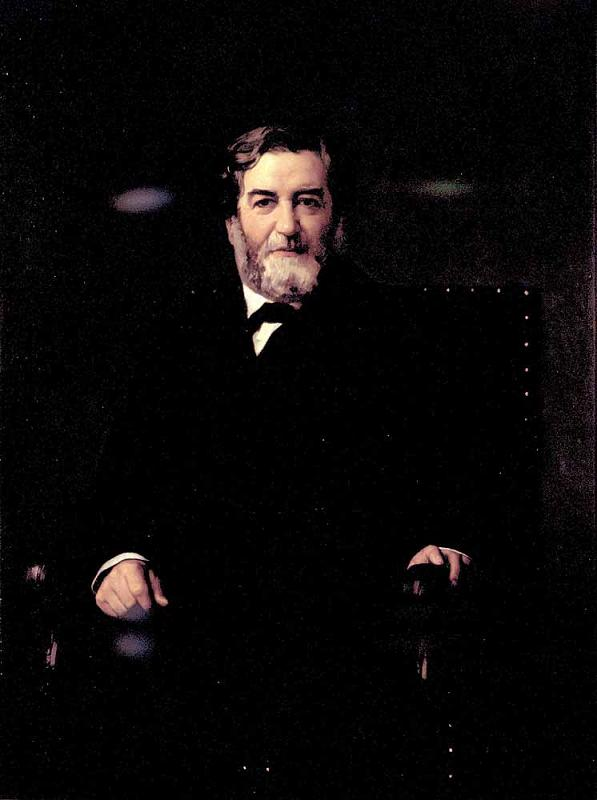

Prime Minister of Spain
- In office 20 November 1843 – 5 December 1843
- Monarch: Isabella II
- Preceded by: Joaquin Maria Lopez
- Succeeded by: Luis Gonzalez-Bravo

Minister of State
- In office 20 November 1843 – 29 November 1843
- Preceded by: Joaquin de Frias
- Succeeded by: Luis González Bravo

Seat N of the Real Academia Española
- In office 23 April 1871 – 23 September 1873
- Preceded by: Frutos Saavedra Meneses (Note: Saavedra was elected for the position in 1867 but never took the seat)
- Succeeded by: León Galindo de Vera

Personal details
- Born: Salustiano de Olózaga y Almandoz; 8 June 1805 Oyon, Spain
- Died: 23 September 1873 (aged 68) Enghien-les-Bains, France
- Resting place: Pantheon of Illustrious Men
- Party: Progressive Party (Spain)
- Spouse: Felisa Camarasa
- Education: University of Zaragoza; Central University (Madrid)
- Occupation: Soldier, writer and lawyer
- Awards: Knight of the Order of the Golden Fleece; Great Cross of the Order of Charles III

Salustiano de Olózaga y Almandoz (8 June 1805, in Oyón-Oion, Álava – 26 September 1873, in Enghien-les-Bains, France) was a Spanish politician, diplomat, lawyer and writer who served as Prime Minister of Spain and was appointed three times ambassador to France.

== Family and Surroundings ==
Olózaga was born into a comfortable liberal family who lived in the Rioja Alavesa part of Northern Spain. His grandfather, Ramón Antonio obtained in 1791 the recognition of his nobility thanks to the rule of universal hidalgocy. His grandfather would go on to serve as regidor of Logroño. Olózaga's father was a Doctor of Medicine who worked for the city of Arnedo earning a comfortable wage.

Soon after being born, he moved to the family house in Arnedo where he would learn his first letters and words. Years later Olózaga would go on to say that he learned these reading from the Spanish Constitution of 1812, updating it as more articles where passed in parliamentary sessions.

His Latin teacher was Marcelino Magro, a liberal cathedraticum who was originally from Cuenca, Spain but had taken refuge in Arnedo. Marcelino Magro would use texts from Latin authors as his learning materials, instead of the catechism as was normal at that time.

At this time he would be successful in the Latin tournament held by the franciscans in the Convento de Vico. The winner obtained the right for the rest of the students to chant their town. That chant of "Viva Arnedo!" would stay with him for his entire life, such that in his death bed he still wrote a letter to his son remembering that moment.
