= Ramón María Narváez =

Spanish general and statesman (1800–1868)

The Most Excellent Ramón María Narváez 1st Duke of Valencia GE LH
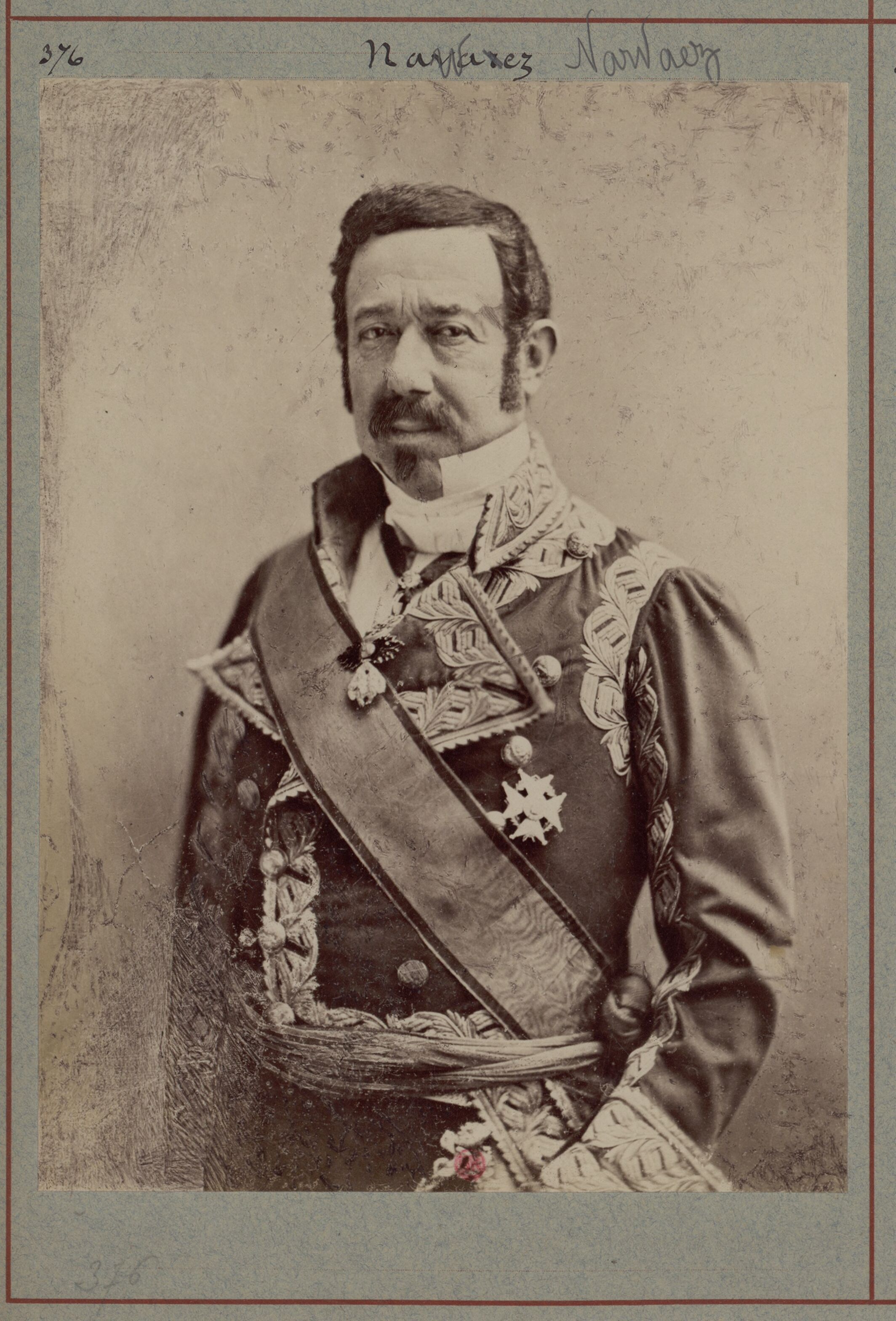

Prime Minister of Spain
- In office 3 May 1844 – 11 February 1846
- Monarch: Isabella II
- Preceded by: Luis Gonzalez-Bravo
- Succeeded by: Manuel Pando
- In office 16 March – 5 April 1846
- Monarch: Isabella II
- Preceded by: Manuel Pando
- Succeeded by: Francisco Javier Istúriz
- In office 4 October 1847 – 19 October 1849
- Monarch: Isabella II
- Preceded by: Florencio García Goyena
- Succeeded by: Serafín María de Sotto
- In office 20 October 1849 – 14 January 1851
- Monarch: Isabella II
- Preceded by: Serafín María de Sotto
- Succeeded by: Juan Bravo Murillo
- In office 12 October 1856 – 15 October 1857
- Monarch: Isabella II
- Preceded by: Leopoldo O'Donnell
- Succeeded by: Francisco Armero Peñaranda
- In office 16 September 1864 – 21 June 1865
- Monarch: Isabella II
- Preceded by: Alejandro Mon y Menéndez
- Succeeded by: Leopoldo O'Donnell
- In office 10 July 1866 – 23 April 1868
- Monarch: Isabella II
- Preceded by: Leopoldo O'Donnell
- Succeeded by: Luis González Bravo

Minister of State of Spain
- Acting
- In office 1 July – 21 August 1844
- Monarch: Isabella II
- Preceded by: Manuel de la Pezuela
- Succeeded by: Francisco Martínez de la Rosa
- Acting
- In office 16 March – 5 April 1846
- Monarch: Isabella II
- Preceded by: Manue de Pando
- Succeeded by: Francisco Javier de Istúriz
- In office 4 October – 23 October 1847
- Monarch: Isabella II
- Preceded by: Modesto Cortázar
- Succeeded by: Carlos Martínez de Irujo

Minister of War of Spain
- In office 3 May 1844 – 12 February 1846
- Monarch: Isabella II
- Preceded by: Manuel de Mazarredo
- Succeeded by: Federico Roncali
- In office 16 March – 5 April 1846
- Monarch: Isabella II
- Preceded by: Federico Roncali
- Succeeded by: Francisco Armero (as acting)
- In office 3 November – 24 December 1847
- Monarch: Isabella II
- Preceded by: Fernando Fernández de Córdoba
- Succeeded by: Francisco de Paula Figueras
- In office 10 July 1866 – 23 April 1868
- Monarch: Isabella II
- Preceded by: Felipe Rivero y Lemoine
- Succeeded by: Rafael Meyalde

Personal details
- Born: Ramon María Narváez y Campos; 5 August 1800 Loja, Spain
- Died: 23 April 1868 (aged 67) Madrid, Spain
- Party: Moderate Party
- Spouse: Marie Alexandrine de Tascher (m. 1844)

Military service
- Allegiance: Spain
- Rank: General
- Battles/wars: First Carlist War

Ramón María Narváez y Campos, 1st Duke of Valencia (5 August 1800 – 23 April 1868) was a Spanish general and statesman who served as Prime Minister on several occasions during the reign of Isabella II. He was also known in Spain as El Espadón de Loja, "The Longsword of Loja".

== Biography ==
He was born at Loja, Granada, a son of José María Narváez y Porcel, 1st Count of Cañada Alta, and wife María Ramona de Campos y Mateos. He entered the army at an early age, and saw active service under Francisco Espoz y Mina in Catalonia in 1822.

He was in his sympathies a Conservative, and could not fully support the Radical opposition to Ferdinand VII, whom he served after his restoration. When the king died in 1833, Narváez became one of the Conservative supporters of Isabel II.

He achieved great popularity by his victory over Miguel Gómez Damas, the Carlist general, at the Battle of Majaceite near Arcos de la Frontera, in November 1836. After clearing La Mancha of brigands by a vigorous policy of suppression in 1838 he was appointed captain-general of Old Castile, and commander-in-chief of the army of reserves.

In 1840, for the part he had taken at Seville in the insurrection against Baldomero Espartero, Count of Luchana and the Progresista party, he was compelled to take refuge in France, where, in conjunction with Maria Cristina, he planned the expedition of 1843 which led to Espartero's overthrow.

On 3 May 1844 Narváez became the 26th prime minister, on 1 July 1844 the 102nd Minister of Foreign Affairs until 21 August 1844, and on 18 November 1845 was created field-marshal and Duque de Valencia, but his policy was too reactionary to be tolerated long, and he was compelled to quit office on 12 February 1846. He then held the post of ambassador at Paris, until again called to preside over the council of ministers as the 28th Prime Minister from 16 March 1846 to 4 April 1846 and 105th Minister of Foreign Affairs from 16 March 1846 to 5 April 1846, and again as the 34th Prime Minister and 111th Minister of Foreign Affairs on 4 October 1847; but misunderstandings with Maria Cristina led to his resignation as minister on 23 October 1847 and as prime minister in the following year on 19 October 1849. On the next day, however, he was recalled as the 36th Prime Minister on 20 October 1849, remaining in office until 10 January 1851.

He was the 58th Grand Cross of the Order of the Tower and Sword in 1848.

His ministry succeeded that of General Leopoldo O'Donnell for a short time as 45th Prime Minister between 12 October 1856 and 15 October 1856, and he again returned to power for a few months as 52nd Prime Minister between 16 September 1864 and 19 May 1865. He once more replaced O'Donnell as the 54th Prime Minister on 11 July 1866, and was still in office when he died at Madrid on 22 April/23 April 1868. On his deathbed, he was asked to forgive his enemies. His answer would become infamous, as he stated "I don't need to forgive my enemies — I have had them all shot."

He married French Marie Alexandrine de Tascher, 369th Dame of the Royal Order of Queen Maria Luisa on 22 July 1844.

He was succeeded in his titles by his nephew, son of his older brother José de Narváez y Campos, 2nd Count of Cañada Alta, and wife and cousin Epifania Porcel y Valdivia, José María de Narváez y Porcel (d. 1890), 2nd Duke of Valencia, 1st Marquess of Oquendo, 3rd Count of Cañada Alta and 2nd Viscount of Aliatar, married to Josefa María del Águila y Cevallos (d. 1888), 13th Marchioness of Espeja, daughter of Luis Ramón del Águila y Alvarado, 12th Marquess of Espeja, and wife Josefa Manuela Petra de Cevallos y Alvarez de Faria (daughter of Pedro de Cevallos y Guerra (1759–1838) and wife Josefa Juana Alvarez de Faria y Sánchez-Zarzosa, maternal aunt of Manuel de Godoy), and had issue.

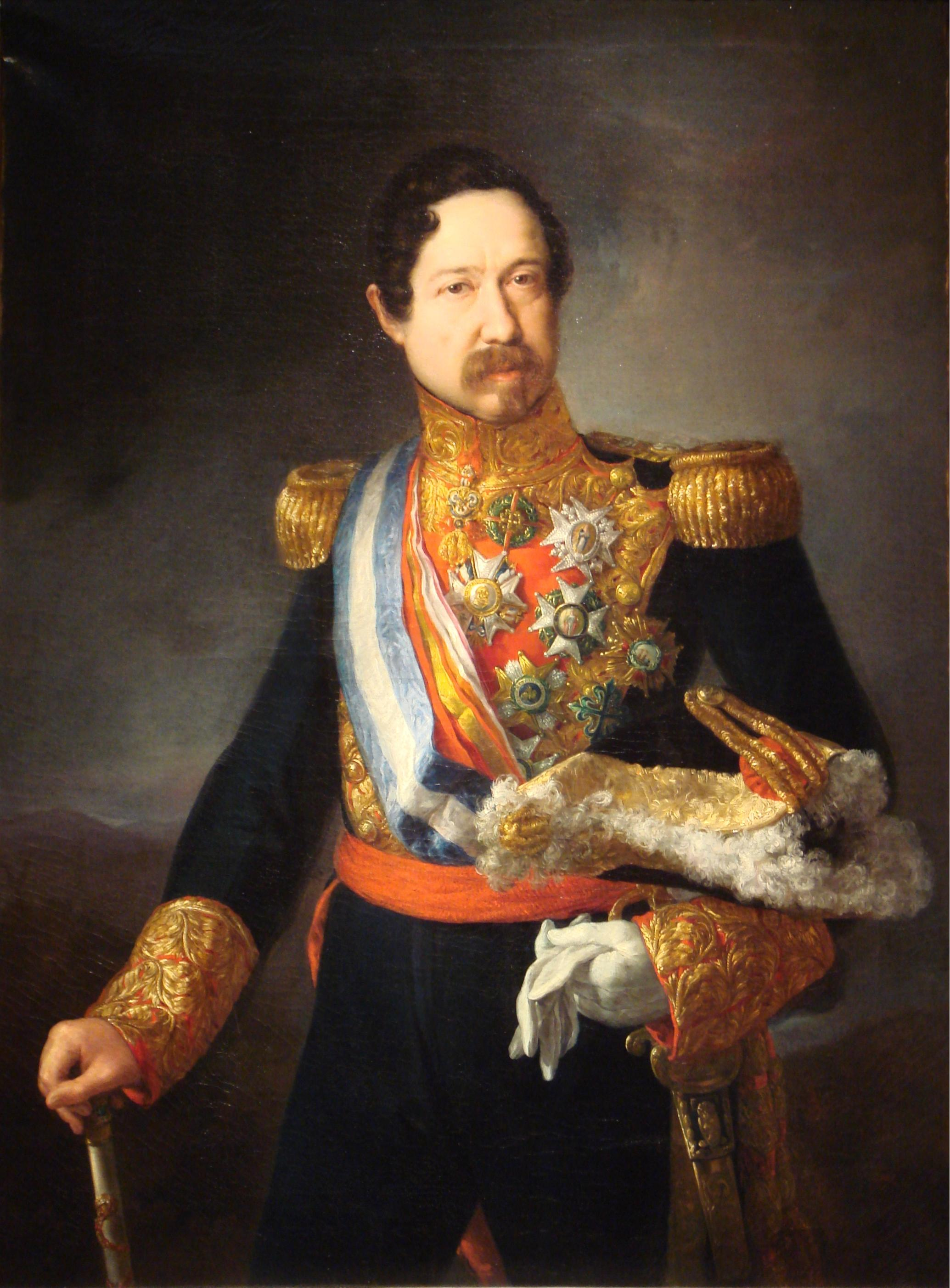
The Duke of Valencia, by Vicente López.

== Honours ==
=== Spanish ===
- Knight Grand Cross of the Order of Charles III
- Knight Grand Cross of the Royal and Military Order of San Hermenegild
- Knight Grand Cross of the Order of Isabella the Catholic
- Knight of the Order of Alcántara
- Knight of the Order of the Golden Fleece

=== Foreign ===
- Grand Cross of the Legion of Honour (France)
- Grand Cross of the Military Order of the Tower and Sword (Kingdom of Portugal
- Knight of the Order of St. Andrew (Russian Empire)

Political offices
Preceded by Luis González-Bravo	Prime Minister of Spain; 3 May 1844 – 12 February 1846	Succeeded by The Marquis of Miraflores
Preceded by The Marquis of Viluma	Minister of State; Acting; 1 July 1844 – 21 August 1844	Succeeded by Francisco de Paula Martínez de la Rosa
Preceded by The Marquis of Miraflores	Prime Minister of Spain; 16 March 1846 – 5 April 1846	Succeeded by Francisco Javier de Istúriz
Preceded by The Marquis of Miraflores	Minister of State; Acting; 16 March 1846 – 5 April 1846	Succeeded by Francisco Javier de Istúriz
Preceded by Florencio García Goyena	Prime Minister of Spain; 4 October 1847 – 19 October 1849	Succeeded by The Count of Clonard
Preceded by Modesto Cortázar	Minister of State; 4 October 1847 – 23 October 1847	Succeeded by The Duke of Sotomayor
Preceded by The Count of Clonard	Prime Minister of Spain; 20 October 1849 – 14 January 1851	Succeeded by Juan Bravo Murillo
Preceded by The Count of Lucena	Prime Minister of Spain; 12 October 1856 – 15 October 1857	Succeeded by Francisco Armero
Preceded by Alejandro Mon	Prime Minister of Spain; 16 September 1864 – 21 June 1865	Succeeded by The Duke of Tetuan
Preceded by The Duke of Tetuan	Prime Minister of Spain; 10 July 1866 – 23 April 1868	Succeeded by Luis González-Bravo
Spanish nobility
Preceded by New creation	Duke of Valencia; 1845-1868	Succeeded by José María de Narváez
