= Domingo Dulce, 1st Marquis of Castell-Florite =

Spanish noble and general

General Domingo Dulce y Garay 1st Marquis of Castell-Florite
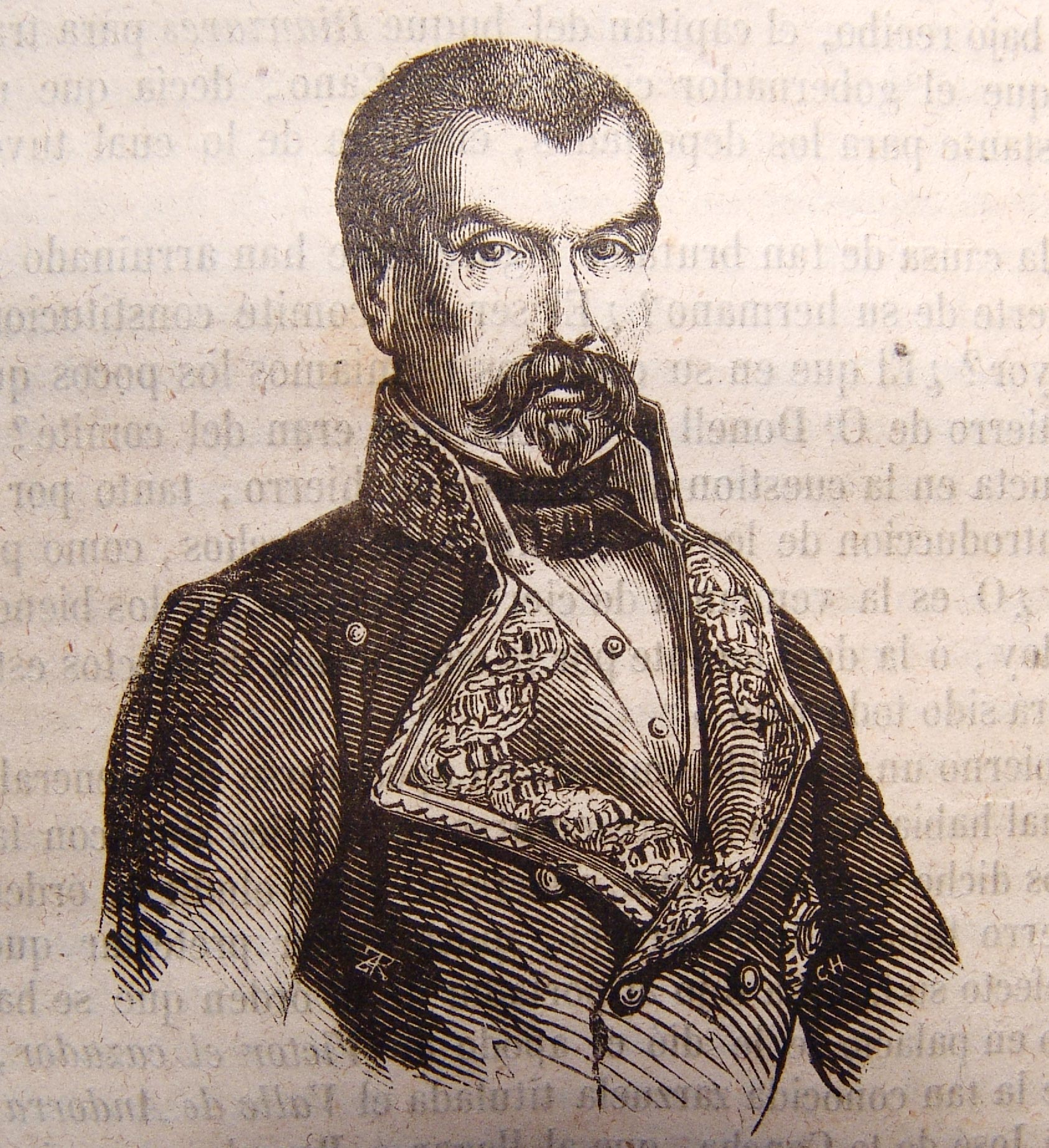
- Domingo Dulce in 1854.
- Born: 7 May 1808; Sotés, La Rioja, Spain
- Died: 23 November 1869 (aged 61); Amélie-les-Bains-Palalda, France
- Military career
- Allegiance: (Restoration (Spain)) Spain
- Branch: (Restoration (Spain)) Spanish Army
- Service years: 1823 — 1868
- Rank: General
- Conflicts: First Carlist War Second Carlist War Dominican Restoration War Glorious Revolution (Spain) Ten Years' War

Captain General of Cuba
- In office 10 December 1862 – 30 May 1866
- Monarch: Isabella II
- Prime Minister: Leopoldo O'Donnell; Manuel de Pando, 6th Marquis of Miraflores; Lorenzo Arrazola; Alejandro Mon y Menéndez; Ramón María Narváez; Leopoldo O'Donnell
- Minister of Overseas: Leopoldo O'Donnell; Manuel de Pando, 6th Marquis of Miraflores; José Gutiérrez de la Concha (as interim); Francisco Permanyer y Tuyet; José Gutiérrez de la Concha (as interim); Alejandro de Castro y Casal; Diego López Ballesteros; Manuel Seijas Lozano; Antonio Cánovas del Castillo
- Preceded by: Francisco de Lersundi y Ormaechea
- Succeeded by: Felipe Ginovés del Espinar (as acting)
- In office 4 January – 2 June 1869
- Regent: Francisco Serrano
- Prime Minister: Francisco Serrano
- Minister of Overseas: Adelardo López de Ayala; Juan Bautista Topete (as interim)
- Preceded by: Francisco Serrano
- Succeeded by: Francisco de Lersundi y Ormaechea

Domingo Dulce y Garay, 1st Marquis of Castell-Florite (Sotés (La Rioja), Spain, 7 May 1808 - Amélie-les-Bains-Palalda, France, 23 November 1869), was a Spanish noble and general, who fought in the First Carlist War and who served two times as Captain General of Cuba.

== Biography ==
He joined the Spanish army in 1823 at the end of the Trienio Liberal and participated in the First Carlist War under the command of the Christino Baldomero Espartero, a close friend. During the campaign he won four Lauriate crosses. His friendship with Espartero let to his collaboration during the Espartero or second regency while Isabel was a minor, during which period he was prominent in quelling the moderate liberal revolt of 1841 when Diego de León and Manuel de la Concha tried to enter the Royal Palace of Madrid and kidnap the young queen.

With the rank of general he participated in the Second Carlist War and defeated the Carlist general Ramón Cabrera y Griñó. He supported General O'Donnell's Bienio progresista and then suppressed a Carlist uprising at Sant Carles de la Ràpita which earned him he title of Marquis of Castell-Florite.

During most of the Liberal Union government period (1856-1863), he was stationed in Cuba as Captain-General although his support of O'Donnell did not dispel their suspicion of him, even after he served as a senator from 1858 to 1860.

During his stay in America, he was noted for his clear commitment to abolish slavery, which earned him the enmity of the Spanish expatriates and open confrontation with Julian de Zulueta. On his return in 1866, he conspired against the government of Isabella II, for which he was exiled to the Canary Islands, along with General Serrano, and returned after the triumph of the September Revolution of 1868. He was one of the signatories of the manifesto "Spain with Honor" of 19 September of that year.

He returned to Cuba, and is noted for having decreed on 9 January 1869, for the first time on the island, the freedom of the press, just a few months before his death from cancer on 23 November 1869.
