= List of colonial governors of Cuba =

This is a list of colonial heads of Cuba.

Dates in italics indicate de facto continuation of office.

No.	Tenure	Incumbent	Notes	Viceroy of the Indies	Secretary of the Indies	Valido Secretary of the Universal Bureau First Secretary of State	Regent	Monarch
Spanish Suzerainty								
Governors								
1	1511 to 12 June 1524	Diego Velázquez de Cuéllar		Diego Columbus (1511 –1526)	Vacant (Overseas Affairs hold by the President of the Council of the Indies)	No valido	Ferdinand II of Aragón Governor of Castile (1507 –1516) (Note: In absence of Joanna of Castile, where its confined)	Joanna (1504 –1555) (Note: Co-monarch with his son Charles since 1516)
1	1511 to 12 June 1524	Diego Velázquez de Cuéllar		Diego Columbus (1511 –1526)	Vacant (Overseas Affairs hold by the President of the Council of the Indies)	No valido	Cardinal Cisneros (1516–1517)	Joanna (1504 –1555)
1	1511 to 12 June 1524	Diego Velázquez de Cuéllar		Diego Columbus (1511 –1526)	Vacant (Overseas Affairs hold by the President of the Council of the Indies)	No valido	No regent	Charles I (1516 –1556)
1	1511 to 12 June 1524	Diego Velázquez de Cuéllar		Governor of New Spain	Vacant (Overseas Affairs hold by the President of the Council of the Indies)	No valido	No regent	Charles I (1516 –1556)
1	1511 to 12 June 1524	Diego Velázquez de Cuéllar		Hernán Cortés (1521)	Vacant (Overseas Affairs hold by the President of the Council of the Indies)	No valido	No regent	Charles I (1516 –1556)
1	1511 to 12 June 1524	Diego Velázquez de Cuéllar		Cristóbal de la Tapia (1521)	Vacant (Overseas Affairs hold by the President of the Council of the Indies)	No valido	No regent	Charles I (1516 –1556)
1	1511 to 12 June 1524	Diego Velázquez de Cuéllar		Hernán Cortés (1521 –1524)	Vacant (Overseas Affairs hold by the President of the Council of the Indies)	No valido	No regent	Charles I (1516 –1556)
2	12 June 1524 to 14 March 1525	Manuel de Rojas y Cordova		Hernán Cortés (1521 –1524)	Vacant (Overseas Affairs hold by the President of the Council of the Indies)	No valido	No regent	Charles I (1516 –1556)
2	12 June 1524 to 14 March 1525	Manuel de Rojas y Cordova		Alonso de Estrada; Rodrigo de Albornoz; Alonso de Zuazo (1524)	Vacant (Overseas Affairs hold by the President of the Council of the Indies)	No valido	No regent	Charles I (1516 –1556)
2	12 June 1524 to 14 March 1525	Manuel de Rojas y Cordova		Gonzalo de Salazar; Pedro Almíndez Chirino; Alonso de Zuazo (1524 –1525)	Vacant (Overseas Affairs hold by the President of the Council of the Indies)	No valido	No regent	Charles I (1516 –1556)
2	12 June 1524 to 14 March 1525	Manuel de Rojas y Cordova		Gonzalo de Salazar; Pedro Almíndez Chirino; Alonso de Estrada; Rodrigo de Albornoz; Alonso de Zuazo (1525)	Vacant (Overseas Affairs hold by the President of the Council of the Indies)	No valido	No regent	Charles I (1516 –1556)
3	14 March 1525 to 27 April 1526	Juan de Altamarino		Gonzalo de Salazar; Pedro Almíndez Chirino; Alonso de Estrada; Rodrigo de Albornoz; Alonso de Zuazo (1525)	Vacant (Overseas Affairs hold by the President of the Council of the Indies)	No valido	No regent	Charles I (1516 –1556)
3	14 March 1525 to 27 April 1526	Juan de Altamarino		Gonzalo de Salazar; Pedro Almíndez Chirino; Alonso de Zuazo (1525)	Vacant (Overseas Affairs hold by the President of the Council of the Indies)	No valido	No regent	Charles I (1516 –1556)
3	14 March 1525 to 27 April 1526	Juan de Altamarino		Gonzalo de Salazar; Pedro Almíndez Chirino (1525 –1526)	Vacant (Overseas Affairs hold by the President of the Council of the Indies)	No valido	No regent	Charles I (1516 –1556)
3	14 March 1525 to 27 April 1526	Juan de Altamarino		Alonso de Estrada; Rodrigo de Albornoz (1526)	Vacant (Overseas Affairs hold by the President of the Council of the Indies)	No valido	No regent	Charles I (1516 –1556)
4	27 April 1526 to 6 November 1531	Gonzalo Nuño de Guzmán		Alonso de Estrada; Rodrigo de Albornoz (1526)	Vacant (Overseas Affairs hold by the President of the Council of the Indies)	No valido	No regent	Charles I (1516 –1556)
4	27 April 1526 to 6 November 1531	Gonzalo Nuño de Guzmán		Hernán Cortés (1526)	Vacant (Overseas Affairs hold by the President of the Council of the Indies)	No valido	No regent	Charles I (1516 –1556)
4	27 April 1526 to 6 November 1531	Gonzalo Nuño de Guzmán		Luis Ponce de León (1526 –1527)	Vacant (Overseas Affairs hold by the President of the Council of the Indies)	No valido	No regent	Charles I (1516 –1556)
4	27 April 1526 to 6 November 1531	Gonzalo Nuño de Guzmán		Marcos de Aguilar (1526 –1527)	Vacant (Overseas Affairs hold by the President of the Council of the Indies)	No valido	No regent	Charles I (1516 –1556)
4	27 April 1526 to 6 November 1531	Gonzalo Nuño de Guzmán		Alonso de Estrada; Gonzalo de Sandoval; Luis de la Torre (1527)	Vacant (Overseas Affairs hold by the President of the Council of the Indies)	No valido	No regent	Charles I (1516 –1556)
4	27 April 1526 to 6 November 1531	Gonzalo Nuño de Guzmán		Alonso de Estrada; Luis de la Torre (1527 –1528)	Vacant (Overseas Affairs hold by the President of the Council of the Indies)	No valido	No regent	Charles I (1516 –1556)
4	27 April 1526 to 6 November 1531	Gonzalo Nuño de Guzmán		Nuño Beltrán de Guzmán; Juan Ortiz de Matienzo; Diego Delgadillo (1528–1529)	Vacant (Overseas Affairs hold by the President of the Council of the Indies)	No valido	No regent	Charles I (1516 –1556)
4	27 April 1526 to 6 November 1531	Gonzalo Nuño de Guzmán		Juan Ortiz de Matienzo; Diego Delgadillo (1529 –1531)	Vacant (Overseas Affairs hold by the President of the Council of the Indies)	No valido	No regent	Charles I (1516 –1556)
4	27 April 1526 to 6 November 1531	Gonzalo Nuño de Guzmán		Sebastián Ramírez de Fuenleal; Vasco de Quiroga; Juan de Salmerón; Alonso de Maldonado; Francisco Ceinos (1531 –1535)	Vacant (Overseas Affairs hold by the President of the Council of the Indies)	No valido	No regent	Charles I (1516 –1556)
5	7 November 1531 to 7 September 1532	Juan de Vadillo		Sebastián Ramírez de Fuenleal; Vasco de Quiroga; Juan de Salmerón; Alonso de Maldonado; Francisco Ceinos (1531 –1535)	Vacant (Overseas Affairs hold by the President of the Council of the Indies)	No valido	No regent	Charles I (1516 –1556)
6	1 March 1532 to 1 February 1534	Manuel de Rojas y Cordova		Sebastián Ramírez de Fuenleal; Vasco de Quiroga; Juan de Salmerón; Alonso de Maldonado; Francisco Ceinos (1531 –1535)	Vacant (Overseas Affairs hold by the President of the Council of the Indies)	No valido	No regent	Charles I (1516 –1556)
7	28 March 1535 to 1537	Gonzalo Nuño de Guzmán		Sebastián Ramírez de Fuenleal; Vasco de Quiroga; Juan de Salmerón; Alonso de Maldonado; Francisco Ceinos (1531 –1535)	Vacant (Overseas Affairs hold by the President of the Council of the Indies)	No valido	No regent	Charles I (1516 –1556)
7	28 March 1535 to 1537	Gonzalo Nuño de Guzmán		Viceroy of New Spain	Vacant (Overseas Affairs hold by the President of the Council of the Indies)	No valido	No regent	Charles I (1516 –1556)
7	28 March 1535 to 1537	Gonzalo Nuño de Guzmán		Antonio de Mendoza (1535 –1550)	Vacant (Overseas Affairs hold by the President of the Council of the Indies)	No valido	No regent	Charles I (1516 –1556)
8	20 March 1537 to 12 May 1539	Hernando de Soto		Antonio de Mendoza (1535 –1550)	Vacant (Overseas Affairs hold by the President of the Council of the Indies)	No valido	No regent	Charles I (1516 –1556)
9	12 May 1539 to 1544	Isabel de Bobadilla	Wife of Hernando de Soto	Antonio de Mendoza (1535 –1550)	Vacant (Overseas Affairs hold by the President of the Council of the Indies)	No valido	No regent	Charles I (1516 –1556)
10	1544 to 5 June 1546	Juanes de Ávila		Antonio de Mendoza (1535 –1550)	Vacant (Overseas Affairs hold by the President of the Council of the Indies)	No valido	No regent	Charles I (1516 –1556)
11	5 June 1546 to 1548	Antonio de Cháves		Antonio de Mendoza (1535 –1550)	Vacant (Overseas Affairs hold by the President of the Council of the Indies)	No valido	No regent	Charles I (1516 –1556)
12	1549 to 8 March 1555	Gonzalo Pérez de Angulo		Antonio de Mendoza (1535 –1550)	Vacant (Overseas Affairs hold by the President of the Council of the Indies)	No valido	No regent	Charles I (1516 –1556)
12	1549 to 8 March 1555	Gonzalo Pérez de Angulo		Luis de Velasco (1550 –1564)	Vacant (Overseas Affairs hold by the President of the Council of the Indies)	No valido	No regent	Charles I (1516 –1556)
13	1556 to 1565	Diego de Mazariegos		Luis de Velasco (1550 –1564)	Vacant (Overseas Affairs hold by the President of the Council of the Indies)	No valido	No regent	Philip II (1556–1598)
13	1556 to 1565	Diego de Mazariegos		Francisco Ceinos Dean of the Audiencia (1564–1566)	Vacant (Overseas Affairs hold by the President of the Council of the Indies)	No valido	No regent	Philip II (1556–1598)
14	19 September 1565 to 24 November 1567	Francisco García Osorio		Francisco Ceinos Dean of the Audiencia (1564–1566)	Vacant (Overseas Affairs hold by the President of the Council of the Indies)	No valido	No regent	Philip II (1556–1598)
14	19 September 1565 to 24 November 1567	Francisco García Osorio		Gastón Carrillo de Peralta (1566–1567)	Vacant (Overseas Affairs hold by the President of the Council of the Indies)	No valido	No regent	Philip II (1556–1598)
14	19 September 1565 to 24 November 1567	Francisco García Osorio		Alonso Muñoz Luis Carrillo (1567–1568)	Vacant (Overseas Affairs hold by the President of the Council of the Indies)	No valido	No regent	Philip II (1556–1598)
15	24 November 1567 to 16 September 1574	Pedro Menéndez de Avilés		Alonso Muñoz Luis Carrillo (1567–1568)	Vacant (Overseas Affairs hold by the President of the Council of the Indies)	No valido	No regent	Philip II (1556–1598)
15	24 November 1567 to 16 September 1574	Pedro Menéndez de Avilés		Martín Enríquez de Almanza (1568–1580)	Vacant (Overseas Affairs hold by the President of the Council of the Indies)	No valido	No regent	Philip II (1556–1598)
16	1572 to 1574	Sancho Pardo Donlebún		Martín Enríquez de Almanza (1568–1580)	Vacant (Overseas Affairs hold by the President of the Council of the Indies)	No valido	No regent	Philip II (1556–1598)
17	1574 to 13 February 1577	Gabriel de Montalvo		Martín Enríquez de Almanza (1568–1580)	Vacant (Overseas Affairs hold by the President of the Council of the Indies)	No valido	No regent	Philip II (1556–1598)
18	13 February 1577 to 1579	Francisco Carreño		Martín Enríquez de Almanza (1568–1580)	Vacant (Overseas Affairs hold by the President of the Council of the Indies)	No valido	No regent	Philip II (1556–1598)
19	27 April 1579 to 1 September 1579	Gaspar de Torres		Martín Enríquez de Almanza (1568–1580)	Vacant (Overseas Affairs hold by the President of the Council of the Indies)	No valido	No regent	Philip II (1556–1598)
20	1580 to 1589	Gabriel de Luján		Martín Enríquez de Almanza (1568–1580)	Vacant (Overseas Affairs hold by the President of the Council of the Indies)	No valido	No regent	Philip II (1556–1598)
20	1580 to 1589	Gabriel de Luján		Lorenzo Suárez de Mendoza (1580–1583)	Vacant (Overseas Affairs hold by the President of the Council of the Indies)	No valido	No regent	Philip II (1556–1598)
20	1580 to 1589	Gabriel de Luján		Luis de Villanueva y Zapata Dean of the Audiencia (1583–1584)	Vacant (Overseas Affairs hold by the President of the Council of the Indies)	No valido	No regent	Philip II (1556–1598)
20	1580 to 1589	Gabriel de Luján		Pedro de Moya y Contrerás Archbishop of Mexico (1584–1585)	Vacant (Overseas Affairs hold by the President of the Council of the Indies)	No valido	No regent	Philip II (1556–1598)
20	1580 to 1589	Gabriel de Luján		Álvaro Manrique de Zúñiga (1585–1590)	Vacant (Overseas Affairs hold by the President of the Council of the Indies)	No valido	No regent	Philip II (1556–1598)
21	31 March 1589 to April 1595	Juan de Tejeda		Álvaro Manrique de Zúñiga (1585–1590)	Vacant (Overseas Affairs hold by the President of the Council of the Indies)	No valido	No regent	Philip II (1556–1598)
21	31 March 1589 to April 1595	Juan de Tejeda		Luis de Velasco, Marquess of Salinas (1590–1595)	Vacant (Overseas Affairs hold by the President of the Council of the Indies)	No valido	No regent	Philip II (1556–1598)
22	April 1593 to 20 June 1602	Juan Maldonaldo Barnuevo		Luis de Velasco, Marquess of Salinas (1590–1595)	Vacant (Overseas Affairs hold by the President of the Council of the Indies)	No valido	No regent	Philip II (1556–1598)
22	April 1593 to 20 June 1602	Juan Maldonaldo Barnuevo		Gaspar de Zúñiga Acevedo y Fonseca (1595–1603)	Vacant (Overseas Affairs hold by the President of the Council of the Indies)	No valido	No regent	Philip II (1556–1598)
22	April 1593 to 20 June 1602	Juan Maldonaldo Barnuevo		Gaspar de Zúñiga Acevedo y Fonseca (1595–1603)	Vacant (Overseas Affairs hold by the President of the Council of the Indies)	Duke of Lerma (1598–1618) (Note: As valido of the King of Spain)	No regent	Philip III (1598 –1621)
23	20 June 1602 to 16 June 1608	Pedro de Valdez		Gaspar de Zúñiga Acevedo y Fonseca (1595–1603)	Vacant (Overseas Affairs hold by the President of the Council of the Indies)	Duke of Lerma (1598–1618)	No regent	Philip III (1598 –1621)
23	20 June 1602 to 16 June 1608	Pedro de Valdez		Juan de Mendoza y Luna (1603–1607)	Vacant (Overseas Affairs hold by the President of the Council of the Indies)	Duke of Lerma (1598–1618)	No regent	Philip III (1598 –1621)
23	20 June 1602 to 16 June 1608	Pedro de Valdez		Luis de Velasco, Marquess of Salinas (1607–1611)	Vacant (Overseas Affairs hold by the President of the Council of the Indies)	Duke of Lerma (1598–1618)	No regent	Philip III (1598 –1621)
24	16 June 1608 to 1616	Gaspar Ruíz de Pereda		Luis de Velasco, Marquess of Salinas (1607–1611)	Vacant (Overseas Affairs hold by the President of the Council of the Indies)	Duke of Lerma (1598–1618)	No regent	Philip III (1598 –1621)
24	16 June 1608 to 1616	Gaspar Ruíz de Pereda		García Guerra Archbishop of Mexico (1611–1612)	Vacant (Overseas Affairs hold by the President of the Council of the Indies)	Duke of Lerma (1598–1618)	No regent	Philip III (1598 –1621)
24	16 June 1608 to 1616	Gaspar Ruíz de Pereda		Pedro Otárola Dean of the Audiencia (1612)	Vacant (Overseas Affairs hold by the President of the Council of the Indies)	Duke of Lerma (1598–1618)	No regent	Philip III (1598 –1621)
24	16 June 1608 to 1616	Gaspar Ruíz de Pereda		Diego Fernández de Córdoba (1612–1621)	Vacant (Overseas Affairs hold by the President of the Council of the Indies)	Duke of Lerma (1598–1618)	No regent	Philip III (1598 –1621)
25	1616 to 6 June 1619	Sancho de Alquiza		Diego Fernández de Córdoba (1612–1621)	Vacant (Overseas Affairs hold by the President of the Council of the Indies)	Duke of Lerma (1598–1618)	No regent	Philip III (1598 –1621)
25	1616 to 6 June 1619	Sancho de Alquiza		Diego Fernández de Córdoba (1612–1621)	Vacant (Overseas Affairs hold by the President of the Council of the Indies)	Cristóbal Gómez de Sandoval (1618–1621)	No regent	Philip III (1598 –1621)
26	1619 to 1620	Jerónimo de Quero		Diego Fernández de Córdoba (1612–1621)	Vacant (Overseas Affairs hold by the President of the Council of the Indies)	Cristóbal Gómez de Sandoval (1618–1621)	No regent	Philip III (1598 –1621)
26	1619 to 1620	Jerónimo de Quero		Paz de Valecillo Dean of the Audiencia (1621)	Vacant (Overseas Affairs hold by the President of the Council of the Indies)	Cristóbal Gómez de Sandoval (1618–1621)	No regent	Philip III (1598 –1621)
27	14 August 1620 to 16 March 1624	Francisco de Venegas		Paz de Valecillo Dean of the Audiencia (1621)	Vacant (Overseas Affairs hold by the President of the Council of the Indies)	Cristóbal Gómez de Sandoval (1618–1621)	No regent	Philip III (1598 –1621)
27	14 August 1620 to 16 March 1624	Francisco de Venegas		Paz de Valecillo Dean of the Audiencia (1621)	Vacant (Overseas Affairs hold by the President of the Council of the Indies)	Cristóbal Gómez de Sandoval (1618–1621)	No regent	Philip IV (1621 –1665)
27	14 August 1620 to 16 March 1624	Francisco de Venegas		Paz de Valecillo Dean of the Audiencia (1621)	Vacant (Overseas Affairs hold by the President of the Council of the Indies)	Baltasar de Zúñiga (1621–1622)	No regent	Philip IV (1621 –1665)
27	14 August 1620 to 16 March 1624	Francisco de Venegas		Diego Carrillo de Mendoza y Pimental (1621–1624)	Vacant (Overseas Affairs hold by the President of the Council of the Indies)	Baltasar de Zúñiga (1621–1622)	No regent	Philip IV (1621 –1665)
28	16 March 1624 to 16 June 1626	Damián Velásquez de Contreras		Diego Carrillo de Mendoza y Pimental (1621–1624)	Vacant (Overseas Affairs hold by the President of the Council of the Indies)	Count-Duke of Olivares (1622–1643)	No regent	Philip IV (1621 –1665)
28	16 March 1624 to 16 June 1626	Damián Velásquez de Contreras		No viceroy	Vacant (Overseas Affairs hold by the President of the Council of the Indies)	Count-Duke of Olivares (1622–1643)	No regent	Philip IV (1621 –1665)
28	16 March 1624 to 16 June 1626	Damián Velásquez de Contreras		Rodrigo Pacheco y Osorio de Toledo (1624–1635)	Vacant (Overseas Affairs hold by the President of the Council of the Indies)	Count-Duke of Olivares (1622–1643)	No regent	Philip IV (1621 –1665)
29	16 June 1626 to 7 October 1630	Lorenzo de Cabrera y Corbera		Rodrigo Pacheco y Osorio de Toledo (1624–1635)	Vacant (Overseas Affairs hold by the President of the Council of the Indies)	Count-Duke of Olivares (1622–1643)	No regent	Philip IV (1621 –1665)
30	7 October 1630 to 24 May 1634	Juan Bitrián de Viamonte y Navarra		Rodrigo Pacheco y Osorio de Toledo (1624–1635)	Vacant (Overseas Affairs hold by the President of the Council of the Indies)	Count-Duke of Olivares (1622–1643)	No regent	Philip IV (1621 –1665)
31	24 May 1634 to 1639	Francisco Riaño y Gamboa		Rodrigo Pacheco y Osorio de Toledo (1624–1635)	Vacant (Overseas Affairs hold by the President of the Council of the Indies)	Count-Duke of Olivares (1622–1643)	No regent	Philip IV (1621 –1665)
31	24 May 1634 to 1639	Francisco Riaño y Gamboa		Lope Díez de Aux de Armendáriz (1635–1640)	Vacant (Overseas Affairs hold by the President of the Council of the Indies)	Count-Duke of Olivares (1622–1643)	No regent	Philip IV (1621 –1665)
32	1639 to 1647	Álvaro de Luna y Sarmiento		Lope Díez de Aux de Armendáriz (1635–1640)	Vacant (Overseas Affairs hold by the President of the Council of the Indies)	Count-Duke of Olivares (1622–1643)	No regent	Philip IV (1621 –1665)
32	1639 to 1647	Álvaro de Luna y Sarmiento		Diego Roque López Pacheco Cabrera y Bobadilla (1640–1642)	Vacant (Overseas Affairs hold by the President of the Council of the Indies)	Count-Duke of Olivares (1622–1643)	No regent	Philip IV (1621 –1665)
32	1639 to 1647	Álvaro de Luna y Sarmiento		Juan de Palapox y Mendoza Bishop of Puebla (1642)	Vacant (Overseas Affairs hold by the President of the Council of the Indies)	Count-Duke of Olivares (1622–1643)	No regent	Philip IV (1621 –1665)
32	1639 to 1647	Álvaro de Luna y Sarmiento		García Sarmiento de Sotomayor (1642–1648)	Vacant (Overseas Affairs hold by the President of the Council of the Indies)	Count-Duke of Olivares (1622–1643)	No regent	Philip IV (1621 –1665)
32	1639 to 1647	Álvaro de Luna y Sarmiento		García Sarmiento de Sotomayor (1642–1648)	Vacant (Overseas Affairs hold by the President of the Council of the Indies)	Luis de Haro (1643–1661)	No regent	Philip IV (1621 –1665)
33	1647 to 7 October 1653	Diego de Villalba y Toledo, marqués de Campo, señor de la Villa de Santacruz de Pinares		García Sarmiento de Sotomayor (1642–1648)	Vacant (Overseas Affairs hold by the President of the Council of the Indies)	Luis de Haro (1643–1661)	No regent	Philip IV (1621 –1665)
33	1647 to 7 October 1653	Diego de Villalba y Toledo, marqués de Campo, señor de la Villa de Santacruz de Pinares		Marcos de Torres y Rueda Bishop of Yucatan (1648–1649)	Vacant (Overseas Affairs hold by the President of the Council of the Indies)	Luis de Haro (1643–1661)	No regent	Philip IV (1621 –1665)
33	1647 to 7 October 1653	Diego de Villalba y Toledo, marqués de Campo, señor de la Villa de Santacruz de Pinares		Matías de Peralta Dean of the Audiencia (1649–1650)	Vacant (Overseas Affairs hold by the President of the Council of the Indies)	Luis de Haro (1643–1661)	No regent	Philip IV (1621 –1665)
33	1647 to 7 October 1653	Diego de Villalba y Toledo, marqués de Campo, señor de la Villa de Santacruz de Pinares		Luis Enríquez de Guzmán (1650–1653)	Vacant (Overseas Affairs hold by the President of the Council of the Indies)	Luis de Haro (1643–1661)	No regent	Philip IV (1621 –1665)
33	1647 to 7 October 1653	Diego de Villalba y Toledo, marqués de Campo, señor de la Villa de Santacruz de Pinares		Francisco Fernández de la Cueva (1653–1660)	Vacant (Overseas Affairs hold by the President of the Council of the Indies)	Luis de Haro (1643–1661)	No regent	Philip IV (1621 –1665)
34	7 October 1653 to 1654	Francisco Xelder		Francisco Fernández de la Cueva (1653–1660)	Vacant (Overseas Affairs hold by the President of the Council of the Indies)	Luis de Haro (1643–1661)	No regent	Philip IV (1621 –1665)
35	1654 to 1656	Juan de Montanos Blázquez		Francisco Fernández de la Cueva (1653–1660)	Vacant (Overseas Affairs hold by the President of the Council of the Indies)	Luis de Haro (1643–1661)	No regent	Philip IV (1621 –1665)
36	1656 to 1658	Diego Rangel		Francisco Fernández de la Cueva (1653–1660)	Vacant (Overseas Affairs hold by the President of the Council of the Indies)	Luis de Haro (1643–1661)	No regent	Philip IV (1621 –1665)
37	1658 to 1663	Juan de Salamanca		Francisco Fernández de la Cueva (1653–1660)	Vacant (Overseas Affairs hold by the President of the Council of the Indies)	Luis de Haro (1643–1661)	No regent	Philip IV (1621 –1665)
37	1658 to 1663	Juan de Salamanca		Juan de Leyva de la Cerda (1660–1664)	Vacant (Overseas Affairs hold by the President of the Council of the Indies)	Luis de Haro (1643–1661)	No regent	Philip IV (1621 –1665)
37	1658 to 1663	Juan de Salamanca		Juan de Leyva de la Cerda (1660–1664)	Vacant (Overseas Affairs hold by the President of the Council of the Indies)	No valido (Note: Personalist government of Philip IV)	No regent	Philip IV (1621 –1665)
38	1663 to 30 July 1664	Rodrigo Flores de Aldana		Juan de Leyva de la Cerda (1660–1664)	Vacant (Overseas Affairs hold by the President of the Council of the Indies)	No valido	No regent	Philip IV (1621 –1665)
38	1663 to 30 July 1664	Rodrigo Flores de Aldana		Diego Osorio de Escobar y Llamas Bishop of Puebla (1664)	Vacant (Overseas Affairs hold by the President of the Council of the Indies)	No valido	No regent	Philip IV (1621 –1665)
39	30 July 1664 to 6 May 1670	Francisco Oregón y Gascón		Diego Osorio de Escobar y Llamas Bishop of Puebla (1664)	Vacant (Overseas Affairs hold by the President of the Council of the Indies)	No valido	No regent	Philip IV (1621 –1665)
39	30 July 1664 to 6 May 1670	Francisco Oregón y Gascón		Antonio Sebastián de Toledo (1664–1673)	Vacant (Overseas Affairs hold by the President of the Council of the Indies)	No valido	No regent	Philip IV (1621 –1665)
39	30 July 1664 to 6 May 1670	Francisco Oregón y Gascón		Antonio Sebastián de Toledo (1664–1673)	Vacant (Overseas Affairs hold by the President of the Council of the Indies)	Juan Everardo Nithard (1665–1669)	Mariana of Austria (1665–1675) (Note: As regent during the minority of his son, Charles II)	Charles II (1665 –1700)
39	30 July 1664 to 6 May 1670	Francisco Oregón y Gascón		Antonio Sebastián de Toledo (1664–1673)	Vacant (Overseas Affairs hold by the President of the Council of the Indies)	Fernando de Valenzuela (1669–1677)	Mariana of Austria (1665–1675)	Charles II (1665 –1700)
40	6 May 1670 to 31 August 1680	Francisco Rodríguez de Ledesma		Antonio Sebastián de Toledo (1664–1673)	Vacant (Overseas Affairs hold by the President of the Council of the Indies)	Fernando de Valenzuela (1669–1677)	Mariana of Austria (1665–1675)	Charles II (1665 –1700)
40	6 May 1670 to 31 August 1680	Francisco Rodríguez de Ledesma		Pedro Nuño Colón (1673)	Vacant (Overseas Affairs hold by the President of the Council of the Indies)	Fernando de Valenzuela (1669–1677)	Mariana of Austria (1665–1675)	Charles II (1665 –1700)
40	6 May 1670 to 31 August 1680	Francisco Rodríguez de Ledesma		Payo Enríquez de Ribera Manrique Bishop of Puebla and Archbishop of Mexico (1673–1680)	Vacant (Overseas Affairs hold by the President of the Council of the Indies)	Fernando de Valenzuela (1669–1677)	Mariana of Austria (1665–1675)	Charles II (1665 –1700)
40	6 May 1670 to 31 August 1680	Francisco Rodríguez de Ledesma		Payo Enríquez de Ribera Manrique Bishop of Puebla and Archbishop of Mexico (1673–1680)	Vacant (Overseas Affairs hold by the President of the Council of the Indies)	Fernando de Valenzuela (1669–1677)	No regent	Charles II (1665 –1700)
40	6 May 1670 to 31 August 1680	Francisco Rodríguez de Ledesma		Payo Enríquez de Ribera Manrique Bishop of Puebla and Archbishop of Mexico (1673–1680)	Vacant (Overseas Affairs hold by the President of the Council of the Indies)	John Joseph of Austria (1677–1679) (Note: As Chief Minister of Spain)	No regent	Charles II (1665 –1700)
40	6 May 1670 to 31 August 1680	Francisco Rodríguez de Ledesma		Payo Enríquez de Ribera Manrique Bishop of Puebla and Archbishop of Mexico (1673–1680)	Vacant (Overseas Affairs hold by the President of the Council of the Indies)	Duke of Medinaceli (1679–1685)	No regent	Charles II (1665 –1700)
40	6 May 1670 to 31 August 1680	Francisco Rodríguez de Ledesma		Tomás Antonio Manuel Lorenzo (1680–1686)	Vacant (Overseas Affairs hold by the President of the Council of the Indies)	Duke of Medinaceli (1679–1685)	No regent	Charles II (1665 –1700)
41	31 August 1680 to 2 July 1685	José Fernández Córdoba Ponce de León		Tomás Antonio Manuel Lorenzo (1680–1686)	Vacant (Overseas Affairs hold by the President of the Council of the Indies)	Duke of Medinaceli (1679–1685)	No regent	Charles II (1665 –1700)
41	31 August 1680 to 2 July 1685	José Fernández Córdoba Ponce de León		Tomás Antonio Manuel Lorenzo (1680–1686)	Vacant (Overseas Affairs hold by the President of the Council of the Indies)	Count of Oropesa (1685–1691)	No regent	Charles II (1665 –1700)
42	2 July 1685 to 1687	Manuel de Murguia y Mena	Removed from office for illicit trade	Tomás Antonio Manuel Lorenzo (1680–1686)	Vacant (Overseas Affairs hold by the President of the Council of the Indies)	Count of Oropesa (1685–1691)	No regent	Charles II (1665 –1700)
42	2 July 1685 to 1687	Manuel de Murguia y Mena	Removed from office for illicit trade	Melchor Portocarrero y Lasso de la Vega (1686–1688)	Vacant (Overseas Affairs hold by the President of the Council of the Indies)	Count of Oropesa (1685–1691)	No regent	Charles II (1665 –1700)
43	1687 to 1689	Diego Antonio de Viana y Hinojosa		Melchor Portocarrero y Lasso de la Vega (1686–1688)	Vacant (Overseas Affairs hold by the President of the Council of the Indies)	Count of Oropesa (1685–1691)	No regent	Charles II (1665 –1700)
43	1687 to 1689	Diego Antonio de Viana y Hinojosa		Gaspar Melchor Baltasar de la Cerda (1688–1696)	Vacant (Overseas Affairs hold by the President of the Council of the Indies)	Count of Oropesa (1685–1691)	No regent	Charles II (1665 –1700)
44	1689 to 3 October 1695	Severino de Manzaneda Salinas y Rozas		Gaspar Melchor Baltasar de la Cerda (1688–1696)	Vacant (Overseas Affairs hold by the President of the Council of the Indies)	Count of Oropesa (1685–1691)	No regent	Charles II (1665 –1700)
44	1689 to 3 October 1695	Severino de Manzaneda Salinas y Rozas		Gaspar Melchor Baltasar de la Cerda (1688–1696)	Vacant (Overseas Affairs hold by the President of the Council of the Indies)	Cardinal Portocarrero(1691–1698)	No regent	Charles II (1665 –1700)
45	3 October 1695 to 20 September 1702	Diego de Córdoba Lasso de la Vega, Marquis of the Vado del Maestre	Promoted to captain-general of New Granada	Gaspar Melchor Baltasar de la Cerda (1688–1696)	Vacant (Overseas Affairs hold by the President of the Council of the Indies)	Cardinal Portocarrero(1691–1698)	No regent	Charles II (1665 –1700)
45	3 October 1695 to 20 September 1702	Diego de Córdoba Lasso de la Vega, Marquis of the Vado del Maestre	Promoted to captain-general of New Granada	Juan de Ortega Cano Montáñez Bishop of Durango, Bishop of Guatemala, Bishop of Michoacán and Archbishop of Mexico (1696)	Vacant (Overseas Affairs hold by the President of the Council of the Indies)	Cardinal Portocarrero(1691–1698)	No regent	Charles II (1665 –1700)
45	3 October 1695 to 20 September 1702	Diego de Córdoba Lasso de la Vega, Marquis of the Vado del Maestre	Promoted to captain-general of New Granada	José Sarmiento Valladares (1696–1701)	Vacant (Overseas Affairs hold by the President of the Council of the Indies)	Cardinal Portocarrero(1691–1698)	No regent	Charles II (1665 –1700)
45	3 October 1695 to 20 September 1702	Diego de Córdoba Lasso de la Vega, Marquis of the Vado del Maestre	Promoted to captain-general of New Granada	José Sarmiento Valladares (1696–1701)	Vacant (Overseas Affairs hold by the President of the Council of the Indies)	Count of Oropesa (1698–1699)	No regent	Charles II (1665 –1700)
45	3 October 1695 to 20 September 1702	Diego de Córdoba Lasso de la Vega, Marquis of the Vado del Maestre	Promoted to captain-general of New Granada	José Sarmiento Valladares (1696–1701)	Vacant (Overseas Affairs hold by the President of the Council of the Indies)	Cardinal Portocarrero(1699–1700)	Cardinal Portocarrero(1700) (Note: During the illness of Charles II)	Charles II (1665 –1700)
45	3 October 1695 to 20 September 1702	Diego de Córdoba Lasso de la Vega, Marquis of the Vado del Maestre	Promoted to captain-general of New Granada	José Sarmiento Valladares (1696–1701)	Vacant (Overseas Affairs hold by the President of the Council of the Indies)	Cardinal Portocarrero(1699–1700)	Government Board of the Realms (1700–1701) (Note: After the death of Charles II)	Vacant (Note: Until the coronation of Philip of Anjou)
45	3 October 1695 to 20 September 1702	Diego de Córdoba Lasso de la Vega, Marquis of the Vado del Maestre	Promoted to captain-general of New Granada	José Sarmiento Valladares (1696–1701)	Vacant (Overseas Affairs hold by the President of the Council of the Indies)	Antonio de Ubilla (1700–1705) (Note: As Secretary of the Universal Bureau)	Government Board of the Realms (1700–1701)	Philip V (1700 –1724)
45	3 October 1695 to 20 September 1702	Diego de Córdoba Lasso de la Vega, Marquis of the Vado del Maestre	Promoted to captain-general of New Granada	Juan de Ortega Cano Montáñez Archbishop of Mexico (1701–1702)	Vacant (Overseas Affairs hold by the President of the Council of the Indies)	Antonio de Ubilla (1700–1705)	Cardinal Portocarrero(1701–1703)	Philip V (1700 –1724)
46	20 September 1702 to 4 December 1702	Pedro Nicolás Benítez de Lugo	Former gentleman of the Elector of Bavaria; died of yellow fever shortly after assuming office	Juan de Ortega Cano Montáñez Archbishop of Mexico (1701–1702)	Vacant (Overseas Affairs hold by the President of the Council of the Indies)	Antonio de Ubilla (1700–1705)	Cardinal Portocarrero(1701–1703)	Philip V (1700 –1724)
46	20 September 1702 to 4 December 1702	Pedro Nicolás Benítez de Lugo	Former gentleman of the Elector of Bavaria; died of yellow fever shortly after assuming office	Francisco V Férnandez de la Cueva (1702–1710)	Vacant (Overseas Affairs hold by the President of the Council of the Indies)	Antonio de Ubilla (1700–1705)	Cardinal Portocarrero(1701–1703)	Philip V (1700 –1724)
Int.	4 December 1702 to 13 May 1706	Luis Chacón Nicolás Chirino Vandeval	Interim governors military governor civil governor	Francisco V Férnandez de la Cueva (1702–1710)	Vacant (Overseas Affairs hold by the President of the Council of the Indies)	Antonio de Ubilla (1700–1705)	Cardinal Portocarrero(1701–1703)	Philip V (1700 –1724)
Int.	4 December 1702 to 13 May 1706	Luis Chacón Nicolás Chirino Vandeval	Interim governors military governor civil governor	Francisco V Férnandez de la Cueva (1702–1710)	Vacant (Overseas Affairs hold by the President of the Council of the Indies)	Marquess of Mejorada del Campo (1705–1714)	Cardinal Portocarrero(1701–1703)	Philip V (1700 –1724)
Int.	4 December 1702 to 13 May 1706	Luis Chacón Nicolás Chirino Vandeval	Interim governors military governor civil governor	Francisco V Férnandez de la Cueva (1702–1710)	Vacant (Overseas Affairs hold by the President of the Council of the Indies)	Marquess of Mejorada del Campo (1705–1714)	No regent	Philip V (1700 –1724)
47	13 May 1706 to 8 July 1706	Pedro Álvarez de Villarín	Died of yellow fever shortly after assuming office	Francisco V Férnandez de la Cueva (1702–1710)	Vacant (Overseas Affairs hold by the President of the Council of the Indies)	Marquess of Mejorada del Campo (1705–1714)	No regent	Philip V (1700 –1724)
Int.	8 July 1706 to 18 January 1708	Luis Chacón Nicolás Chirino Vandeval	Interim governors military governor civil governor	Francisco V Férnandez de la Cueva (1702–1710)	Vacant (Overseas Affairs hold by the President of the Council of the Indies)	Marquess of Mejorada del Campo (1705–1714)	No regent	Philip V (1700 –1724)
48	18 January 1708 to 18 February 1711	Laureano José de Torres Ayala a Duadros Castellanos, Marquis of Casa Torres	Former governor of Spanish Florida	Francisco V Férnandez de la Cueva (1702–1710)	Vacant (Overseas Affairs hold by the President of the Council of the Indies)	Marquess of Mejorada del Campo (1705–1714)	No regent	Philip V (1700 –1724)
48	18 January 1708 to 18 February 1711	Laureano José de Torres Ayala a Duadros Castellanos, Marquis of Casa Torres	Former governor of Spanish Florida	Fernando de Alencastre Noroña (1710–1716)	Vacant (Overseas Affairs hold by the President of the Council of the Indies)	Marquess of Mejorada del Campo (1705–1714)	No regent	Philip V (1700 –1724)
49	18 February 1711 to 10 June 1711	Pablo Cavero	Assumed power after being sent by the Audiencia of Santo Domingo to investigate the misconduct of Casa Torres; died in Havana shortly afterwards	Fernando de Alencastre Noroña (1710–1716)	Vacant (Overseas Affairs hold by the President of the Council of the Indies)	Marquess of Mejorada del Campo (1705–1714)	No regent	Philip V (1700 –1724)
Int.	10 June 1711 to 14 February 1713	Luis Chacón	Interim governor	Fernando de Alencastre Noroña (1710–1716)	Vacant (Overseas Affairs hold by the President of the Council of the Indies)	Marquess of Mejorada del Campo (1705–1714)	No regent	Philip V (1700 –1724)
50	14 February 1713 to 26 May 1716	Laureano José de Torres Ayala a Duadros Castellanos, Marquis of Casa Torres	Restored to office	Fernando de Alencastre Noroña (1710–1716)	Vacant (Overseas Affairs hold by the President of the Council of the Indies)	Marquess of Mejorada del Campo (1705–1714)	No regent	Philip V (1700 –1724)
50	14 February 1713 to 26 May 1716	Laureano José de Torres Ayala a Duadros Castellanos, Marquis of Casa Torres	Restored to office	Fernando de Alencastre Noroña (1710–1716)	Vacant (Overseas Affairs hold by the President of the Council of the Indies)	Manuel de Vadillo y Velasco (1714)	No regent	Philip V (1700 –1724)
50	14 February 1713 to 26 May 1716	Laureano José de Torres Ayala a Duadros Castellanos, Marquis of Casa Torres	Restored to office	Fernando de Alencastre Noroña (1710–1716)	Vacant (Overseas Affairs hold by the President of the Council of the Indies)	José de Grimaldo (1714–1724)	No regent	Philip V (1700 –1724)
50	14 February 1713 to 26 May 1716	Laureano José de Torres Ayala a Duadros Castellanos, Marquis of Casa Torres	Restored to office	Fernando de Alencastre Noroña (1710–1716)	Bernardo Tinajero de la Escalera (1714–1715) (Note: As Secretary of State for the Navy and the Indies of Spain)	José de Grimaldo (1714–1724)	No regent	Philip V (1700 –1724)
50	14 February 1713 to 26 May 1716	Laureano José de Torres Ayala a Duadros Castellanos, Marquis of Casa Torres	Restored to office	Fernando de Alencastre Noroña (1710–1716)	No secretary	José de Grimaldo (1714–1724)	No regent	Philip V (1700 –1724)
51	26 May 1716 to 23 August 1717	Vicente de Raja		Fernando de Alencastre Noroña (1710–1716)	No secretary	José de Grimaldo (1714–1724)	No regent	Philip V (1700 –1724)
51	26 May 1716 to 23 August 1717	Vicente de Raja		Baltasar de Zúñiga Guzmán (1716–1722)	No secretary	José de Grimaldo (1714–1724)	No regent	Philip V (1700 –1724)
Int.	23 August 1717 to 23 June 1718	Gómez Mazaver Ponce de León	Provisional governor	Baltasar de Zúñiga Guzmán (1716–1722)	No secretary	José de Grimaldo (1714–1724)	No regent	Philip V (1700 –1724)
52	23 June 1718 to 29 September 1724	Gregorio Guazo y Calderón Fernández de la Vega		Baltasar de Zúñiga Guzmán (1716–1722)	No secretary	José de Grimaldo (1714–1724)	No regent	Philip V (1700 –1724)
52	23 June 1718 to 29 September 1724	Gregorio Guazo y Calderón Fernández de la Vega		Baltasar de Zúñiga Guzmán (1716–1722)	Miguel Fernández Durán (1720–1721)	José de Grimaldo (1714–1724)	No regent	Philip V (1700 –1724)
52	23 June 1718 to 29 September 1724	Gregorio Guazo y Calderón Fernández de la Vega		Baltasar de Zúñiga Guzmán (1716–1722)	Andres Matías de Pes Marzaraga (1721–1723)	José de Grimaldo (1714–1724)	No regent	Philip V (1700 –1724)
52	23 June 1718 to 29 September 1724	Gregorio Guazo y Calderón Fernández de la Vega		Juan de Acuña y Bejarano (1722–1734)	Andres Matías de Pes Marzaraga (1721–1723)	José de Grimaldo (1714–1724)	No regent	Philip V (1700 –1724)
52	23 June 1718 to 29 September 1724	Gregorio Guazo y Calderón Fernández de la Vega		Juan de Acuña y Bejarano (1722–1734)	No secretary	José de Grimaldo (1714–1724)	No regent	Philip V (1700 –1724)
52	23 June 1718 to 29 September 1724	Gregorio Guazo y Calderón Fernández de la Vega		Juan de Acuña y Bejarano (1722–1734)	Antonio de Sopeña y Mioño (1724–1726)	José de Grimaldo (1714–1724)	No regent	Philip V (1700 –1724)
52	23 June 1718 to 29 September 1724	Gregorio Guazo y Calderón Fernández de la Vega		Juan de Acuña y Bejarano (1722–1734)	Antonio de Sopeña y Mioño (1724–1726)	José de Grimaldo (1714–1724)	No regent	Luis I (1724)
52	23 June 1718 to 29 September 1724	Gregorio Guazo y Calderón Fernández de la Vega		Juan de Acuña y Bejarano (1722–1734)	Antonio de Sopeña y Mioño (1724–1726)	Juan Bautista de Orendáin (1724)	No regent	Luis I (1724)
52	23 June 1718 to 29 September 1724	Gregorio Guazo y Calderón Fernández de la Vega		Juan de Acuña y Bejarano (1722–1734)	Antonio de Sopeña y Mioño (1724–1726)	Juan Bautista de Orendáin (1724)	No regent	Philip V (1724 –1746)
52	23 June 1718 to 29 September 1724	Gregorio Guazo y Calderón Fernández de la Vega		Juan de Acuña y Bejarano (1722–1734)	Antonio de Sopeña y Mioño (1724–1726)	José de Grimaldo (1724–1725)	No regent	Philip V (1724 –1746)
53	29 September 1724 to 18 March 1734	Dionisio Martínez de la Vega		Juan de Acuña y Bejarano (1722–1734)	Antonio de Sopeña y Mioño (1724–1726)	José de Grimaldo (1724–1725)	No regent	Philip V (1724 –1746)
53	29 September 1724 to 18 March 1734	Dionisio Martínez de la Vega		Juan de Acuña y Bejarano (1722–1734)	Antonio de Sopeña y Mioño (1724–1726)	Baron Ripperda (1725–1726)	No regent	Philip V (1724 –1746)
53	29 September 1724 to 18 March 1734	Dionisio Martínez de la Vega		Juan de Acuña y Bejarano (1722–1734)	Antonio de Sopeña y Mioño (1724–1726)	José de Grimaldo (1725–1726)	No regent	Philip V (1724 –1746)
53	29 September 1724 to 18 March 1734	Dionisio Martínez de la Vega		Juan de Acuña y Bejarano (1722–1734)	José de Patiño y Rosales (1726–1736)	José de Grimaldo (1725–1726)	No regent	Philip V (1724 –1746)
53	29 September 1724 to 18 March 1734	Dionisio Martínez de la Vega		Juan de Acuña y Bejarano (1722–1734)	José de Patiño y Rosales (1726–1736)	Juan Bautista de Orendáin (1726–1734)	No regent	Philip V (1724 –1746)
53	29 September 1724 to 18 March 1734	Dionisio Martínez de la Vega		Juan Antonio de Vizarrón y Eguiarreta Archbishop of Mexico (1734–1740)	José de Patiño y Rosales (1726–1736)	Juan Bautista de Orendáin (1726–1734)	No regent	Philip V (1724 –1746)
54	18 March 1734 to 22 April 1746	Francisco de Güemes y Horcasitas Gordón de Saenz de Villamolinedo, Count of Revillagigedo		Juan Antonio de Vizarrón y Eguiarreta Archbishop of Mexico (1734–1740)	José de Patiño y Rosales (1726–1736)	Juan Bautista de Orendáin (1726–1734)	No regent	Philip V (1724 –1746)
54	18 March 1734 to 22 April 1746	Francisco de Güemes y Horcasitas Gordón de Saenz de Villamolinedo, Count of Revillagigedo		Juan Antonio de Vizarrón y Eguiarreta Archbishop of Mexico (1734–1740)	José de Patiño y Rosales (1726–1736)	José de Patiño y Rosales (1734–1736) (Note: As First Secretary of State of Spain)	No regent	Philip V (1724 –1746)
54	18 March 1734 to 22 April 1746	Francisco de Güemes y Horcasitas Gordón de Saenz de Villamolinedo, Count of Revillagigedo		Juan Antonio de Vizarrón y Eguiarreta Archbishop of Mexico (1734–1740)	Mateo Pablo Díaz de Lavandero (1736–1739)	Marquis of Villarias (1736–1746)	No regent	Philip V (1724 –1746)
54	18 March 1734 to 22 April 1746	Francisco de Güemes y Horcasitas Gordón de Saenz de Villamolinedo, Count of Revillagigedo		Juan Antonio de Vizarrón y Eguiarreta Archbishop of Mexico (1734–1740)	Marquis of Villarias (1739–1746)	Marquis of Villarias (1736–1746)	No regent	Philip V (1724 –1746)
54	18 March 1734 to 22 April 1746	Francisco de Güemes y Horcasitas Gordón de Saenz de Villamolinedo, Count of Revillagigedo		Pedro de Castro Figueroa y Salazar (1740–1741)	Marquis of Villarias (1739–1746)	Marquis of Villarias (1736–1746)	No regent	Philip V (1724 –1746)
54	18 March 1734 to 22 April 1746	Francisco de Güemes y Horcasitas Gordón de Saenz de Villamolinedo, Count of Revillagigedo		Pedro Malo de Villavicencio President of the Audiencia (1741–1742)	Marquis of Villarias (1739–1746)	Marquis of Villarias (1736–1746)	No regent	Philip V (1724 –1746)
54	18 March 1734 to 22 April 1746	Francisco de Güemes y Horcasitas Gordón de Saenz de Villamolinedo, Count of Revillagigedo		Pedro Cebrián y Agustín (1742–1746)	Marquis of Villarias (1739–1746)	Marquis of Villarias (1736–1746)	No regent	Philip V (1724 –1746)
54	18 March 1734 to 22 April 1746	Francisco de Güemes y Horcasitas Gordón de Saenz de Villamolinedo, Count of Revillagigedo		Pedro Cebrián y Agustín (1742–1746)	Marquess of Ensenada (1743–1754)	Marquis of Villarias (1736–1746)	No regent	Philip V (1724 –1746)
55	22 April 1746 to 21 July 1746	Juan Antonio Tineo y Fuertes		Pedro Cebrián y Agustín (1742–1746)	Marquess of Ensenada (1743–1754)	Marquis of Villarias (1736–1746)	No regent	Philip V (1724 –1746)
55	22 April 1746 to 21 July 1746	Juan Antonio Tineo y Fuertes		Juan Francisco de Güemes y Horcasitas (1746–1755)	Marquess of Ensenada (1743–1754)	Marquis of Villarias (1736–1746)	No regent	Ferdinand VI (1746 –1759)
56	21 July 1746 to 9 June 1747	Diego Peñalosa		Juan Francisco de Güemes y Horcasitas (1746–1755)	Marquess of Ensenada (1743–1754)	Marquis of Villarias (1736–1746)	No regent	Ferdinand VI (1746 –1759)
56	21 July 1746 to 9 June 1747	Diego Peñalosa		Juan Francisco de Güemes y Horcasitas (1746–1755)	Marquess of Ensenada (1743–1754)	José de Carvajal (1746–1754)	No regent	Ferdinand VI (1746 –1759)
57	9 June 1747 to 18 May 1760	Francisco Antonio Cagigal de la Vega		Juan Francisco de Güemes y Horcasitas (1746–1755)	Marquess of Ensenada (1743–1754)	José de Carvajal (1746–1754)	No regent	Ferdinand VI (1746 –1759)
57	9 June 1747 to 18 May 1760	Francisco Antonio Cagigal de la Vega		Juan Francisco de Güemes y Horcasitas (1746–1755)	Marquess of Ensenada (1743–1754)	Duke of Huéscar (1754); Interim	No regent	Ferdinand VI (1746 –1759)
57	9 June 1747 to 18 May 1760	Francisco Antonio Cagigal de la Vega		Juan Francisco de Güemes y Horcasitas (1746–1755)	Marquess of Ensenada (1743–1754)	Ricardo Wall (1754–1763)	No regent	Ferdinand VI (1746 –1759)
57	9 June 1747 to 18 May 1760	Francisco Antonio Cagigal de la Vega		Juan Francisco de Güemes y Horcasitas (1746–1755)	Ricardo Wall (1754) (Note: As Secretary of State for the Indies)	Ricardo Wall (1754–1763)	No regent	Ferdinand VI (1746 –1759)
57	9 June 1747 to 18 May 1760	Francisco Antonio Cagigal de la Vega		Juan Francisco de Güemes y Horcasitas (1746–1755)	Julián de Arriaga (1754–1776)	Ricardo Wall (1754–1763)	No regent	Ferdinand VI (1746 –1759)
57	9 June 1747 to 18 May 1760	Francisco Antonio Cagigal de la Vega		Juan Francisco de Güemes y Horcasitas (1746–1755)	Julián de Arriaga (1754–1776)	Ricardo Wall (1754–1763)	Elisabeth Farnese (1759) (Note: Until the arrival of Charles III)	Charles III (1759 –1788)
57	9 June 1747 to 18 May 1760	Francisco Antonio Cagigal de la Vega		Juan Francisco de Güemes y Horcasitas (1746–1755)	Julián de Arriaga (1754–1776)	Ricardo Wall (1754–1763)	No regent	Charles III (1759 –1788)
57	9 June 1747 to 18 May 1760	Francisco Antonio Cagigal de la Vega		Agustín de Ahumada y Villalón (1755–1760)	Julián de Arriaga (1754–1776)	Ricardo Wall (1754–1763)	No regent	Charles III (1759 –1788)
57	9 June 1747 to 18 May 1760	Francisco Antonio Cagigal de la Vega		Francisco Antonio de Echávarri Dean of the Audiencia (1760)	Julián de Arriaga (1754–1776)	Ricardo Wall (1754–1763)	No regent	Charles III (1759 –1788)
57	9 June 1747 to 18 May 1760	Francisco Antonio Cagigal de la Vega		Francisco Cajigal de la Vega (1760)	Julián de Arriaga (1754–1776)	Ricardo Wall (1754–1763)	No regent	Charles III (1759 –1788)
Acting	18 May 1760 to 7 February 1761	Pedro Alonso	Provisional governor	Francisco Cajigal de la Vega (1760)	Julián de Arriaga (1754–1776)	Ricardo Wall (1754–1763)	No regent	Charles III (1759 –1788)
Acting	18 May 1760 to 7 February 1761	Pedro Alonso	Provisional governor	Joaquín de Montserrat (1760–1766)	Julián de Arriaga (1754–1776)	Ricardo Wall (1754–1763)	No regent	Charles III (1759 –1788)
58	7 February 1761 to 13 August 1762	Juan de Prado Mayera Portocarrero y Luna		Joaquín de Montserrat (1760–1766)	Julián de Arriaga (1754–1776)	Ricardo Wall (1754–1763)	No regent	Charles III (1759 –1788)
	British Suzerainty			Secretary of State for the Southern Department		Prime Minister		
59a	13 August 1762 to 1 January 1763	George Keppel, 3rd Earl of Albemarle		The Earl of Egremont (1761–1763)		John Stuart (1761–1763)	No regent	George III (1760 –1820)
60a	1 January 1763 to 8 July 1763	William Keppel		The Earl of Egremont (1761–1763)		John Stuart (1761–1763)	No regent	George III (1760 –1820)
60a	1 January 1763 to 8 July 1763	William Keppel		The Earl of Egremont (1761–1763)		George Grenville (1763–1765)	No regent	George III (1760 –1820)
	Spanish Suzerainty (during the British occupation of La Habana)			Viceroy of New Spain	Secretary of State for the Indies	First Secretary of State		
59	7 September 1762 to 8 July 1763	Fernando de Cagigal de la Vega, Marquess de Casa Cagigal		Joaquín de Montserrat (1760–1766)	Julián de Arriaga (1754–1776)	Ricardo Wall (1754–1763)	No regent	Charles III (1759 –1788)
	Spanish Suzerainty			Viceroy of New Spain	Secretary of the Indies	First Secretary of State Prime Minister		
60	8 July 1763 to 27 June 1765	Ambrosio de Funes Villalpando, Count of Ricla		Joaquín de Montserrat (1760–1766)	Julián de Arriaga (1754–1776)	Ricardo Wall (1754–1763)	No regent	Charles III (1759 –1788)
60	8 July 1763 to 27 June 1765	Ambrosio de Funes Villalpando, Count of Ricla		Joaquín de Montserrat (1760–1766)	Julián de Arriaga (1754–1776)	Jerónimo Grimaldi (1763–1777)	No regent	Charles III (1759 –1788)
61	27 June 1765 to 13 July 1765	Diego Manrique		Joaquín de Montserrat (1760–1766)	Julián de Arriaga (1754–1776)	Jerónimo Grimaldi (1763–1777)	No regent	Charles III (1759 –1788)
Int.	13 July 1765 to 19 March 1766	Pascual Jiménez de Cisneros	Provisional governor	Joaquín de Montserrat (1760–1766)	Julián de Arriaga (1754–1776)	Jerónimo Grimaldi (1763–1777)	No regent	Charles III (1759 –1788)
62	19 March 1766 to 14 August 1771	Antonio María de Bucareli y Ursúa Henestrosa y Lasso de la Vega		Joaquín de Montserrat (1760–1766)	Julián de Arriaga (1754–1776)	Jerónimo Grimaldi (1763–1777)	No regent	Charles III (1759 –1788)
62	19 March 1766 to 14 August 1771	Antonio María de Bucareli y Ursúa Henestrosa y Lasso de la Vega		Carlos Francisco de Croix (1766–1771)	Julián de Arriaga (1754–1776)	Jerónimo Grimaldi (1763–1777)	No regent	Charles III (1759 –1788)
63	14 August 1771 to 18 November 1771	Diego José Navarro García de Valladares	1st Term (Provisional governor)	Carlos Francisco de Croix (1766–1771)	Julián de Arriaga (1754–1776)	Jerónimo Grimaldi (1763–1777)	No regent	Charles III (1759 –1788)
64	18 November 1771 to 12 June 1777	Felipe de Fondesviela y Ondeano, Marquis of la Torre		Carlos Francisco de Croix (1766–1771)	Julián de Arriaga (1754–1776)	Jerónimo Grimaldi (1763–1777)	No regent	Charles III (1759 –1788)
64	18 November 1771 to 12 June 1777	Felipe de Fondesviela y Ondeano, Marquis of la Torre		Antonio María de Bucareli y Ursúa (1771–1779)	Julián de Arriaga (1754–1776)	Jerónimo Grimaldi (1763–1777)	No regent	Charles III (1759 –1788)
64	18 November 1771 to 12 June 1777	Felipe de Fondesviela y Ondeano, Marquis of la Torre		Antonio María de Bucareli y Ursúa (1771–1779)	José de Gálvez (1776–1787)	Jerónimo Grimaldi (1763–1777)	No regent	Charles III (1759 –1788)
64	18 November 1771 to 12 June 1777	Felipe de Fondesviela y Ondeano, Marquis of la Torre		Antonio María de Bucareli y Ursúa (1771–1779)	José de Gálvez (1776–1787)	Count of Floridablanca(1777–1792)	No regent	Charles III (1759 –1788)
Acting	12 June 1777 to 12 February 1782	Diego José Navarro García de Valladares	2nd Term (Provisional governor)	Antonio María de Bucareli y Ursúa (1771–1779)	José de Gálvez (1776–1787)	Count of Floridablanca(1777–1792)	No regent	Charles III (1759 –1788)
Acting	12 June 1777 to 12 February 1782	Diego José Navarro García de Valladares	2nd Term (Provisional governor)	Francisco Romá y Rosell Regent of the Audiencia (1779)	José de Gálvez (1776–1787)	Count of Floridablanca(1777–1792)	No regent	Charles III (1759 –1788)
Acting	12 June 1777 to 12 February 1782	Diego José Navarro García de Valladares	2nd Term (Provisional governor)	Martín de Mayorga Ferrer Captain General of Guatemala (1779–1783)	José de Gálvez (1776–1787)	Count of Floridablanca(1777–1792)	No regent	Charles III (1759 –1788)
65	12 February 1782 to 29 December 1782	Juan Manuel de Cagigal y Monserrat		Martín de Mayorga Ferrer Captain General of Guatemala (1779–1783)	José de Gálvez (1776–1787)	Count of Floridablanca(1777–1792)	No regent	Charles III (1759 –1788)
66	29 December 1782 to 4 February 1785	Luis de Unzaga y Amezaga		Martín de Mayorga Ferrer Captain General of Guatemala (1779–1783)	José de Gálvez (1776–1787)	Count of Floridablanca(1777–1792)	No regent	Charles III (1759 –1788)
66	29 December 1782 to 4 February 1785	Luis de Unzaga y Amezaga		Matías de Gálvez y Gallardo Captain General of Guatemala (1783–1784)	José de Gálvez (1776–1787)	Count of Floridablanca(1777–1792)	No regent	Charles III (1759 –1788)
66	29 December 1782 to 4 February 1785	Luis de Unzaga y Amezaga		Vicente de Herrera y Rivero Regent of the Audiencia (1784–1785)	José de Gálvez (1776–1787)	Count of Floridablanca(1777–1792)	No regent	Charles III (1759 –1788)
67	4 February 1785 to 7 April 1785	Bernardo de Gálvez		Vicente de Herrera y Rivero Regent of the Audiencia (1784–1785)	José de Gálvez (1776–1787)	Count of Floridablanca(1777–1792)	No regent	Charles III (1759 –1788)
Acting	7 April 1785 to 28 December 1785	Bernardo Troncoso Martínez del Rincón	Provisional governor	Vicente de Herrera y Rivero Regent of the Audiencia (1784–1785)	José de Gálvez (1776–1787)	Count of Floridablanca(1777–1792)	No regent	Charles III (1759 –1788)
Acting	7 April 1785 to 28 December 1785	Bernardo Troncoso Martínez del Rincón	Provisional governor	Bernardo de Gálvez y Madrid (1785–1786)	José de Gálvez (1776–1787)	Count of Floridablanca(1777–1792)	No regent	Charles III (1759 –1788)
68	28 December 1785 to 18 April 1789	José Manuel de Ezpeleta		Bernardo de Gálvez y Madrid (1785–1786)	José de Gálvez (1776–1787)	Count of Floridablanca(1777–1792)	No regent	Charles III (1759 –1788)
68	28 December 1785 to 18 April 1789	José Manuel de Ezpeleta		Eusebio Sánchez Pareja y Beleño Regent of the Audiencia (1786–1787)	José de Gálvez (1776–1787)	Count of Floridablanca(1777–1792)	No regent	Charles III (1759 –1788)
68	28 December 1785 to 18 April 1789	José Manuel de Ezpeleta		Alonso Núñez de Haro y Peralta Archbishop of Mexico (1787)	José de Gálvez (1776–1787)	Count of Floridablanca(1777–1792)	No regent	Charles III (1759 –1788)
68	28 December 1785 to 18 April 1789	José Manuel de Ezpeleta		Alonso Núñez de Haro y Peralta Archbishop of Mexico (1787)	Count of Floridablanca(1787); Interim	Count of Floridablanca(1777–1792)	No regent	Charles III (1759 –1788)
68	28 December 1785 to 18 April 1789	José Manuel de Ezpeleta		Alonso Núñez de Haro y Peralta Archbishop of Mexico (1787)	Antonio Porlier (Note: As Secretary of State for Grace and Justice of Indies) Antonio Valdés y Fernández Bazán (1787–1792) (Note: As Secretary of State for War, Treasury, Commerce and Navigation of Indies)	Count of Floridablanca(1777–1792)	No regent	Charles III (1759 –1788)
68	28 December 1785 to 18 April 1789	José Manuel de Ezpeleta		Manuel Antonio Flórez Mandonaldo (1787–1789)	Antonio Porlier Antonio Valdés y Fernández Bazán (1787–1792)	Count of Floridablanca(1777–1792)	No regent	Charles III (1759 –1788)
69	18 April 1789 to 8 July 1790	Domingo Cabello y Robles	Provisional governor	Manuel Antonio Flórez Mandonaldo (1787–1789)	Antonio Porlier Antonio Valdés y Fernández Bazán (1787–1792)	Count of Floridablanca(1777–1792)	No regent	Charles III (1759 –1788)
69	18 April 1789 to 8 July 1790	Domingo Cabello y Robles	Provisional governor	Juan Vicente de Güemes Pacheco (1789–1794)	Antonio Porlier Antonio Valdés y Fernández Bazán (1787–1792)	Count of Floridablanca(1777–1792)	No regent	Charles III (1759 –1788)
69	18 April 1789 to 8 July 1790	Domingo Cabello y Robles	Provisional governor	Juan Vicente de Güemes Pacheco (1789–1794)	Antonio Porlier Antonio Valdés y Fernández Bazán (1787–1792)	Count of Floridablanca(1777–1792)	No regent	Charles IV (1788 –1808)
70	8 July 1790 to 6 December 1796	Luis de las Casas y Aragorri		Juan Vicente de Güemes Pacheco (1789–1794)	Antonio Porlier Antonio Valdés y Fernández Bazán (1787–1792)	Count of Floridablanca(1777–1792)	No regent	Charles IV (1788 –1808)
70	8 July 1790 to 6 December 1796	Luis de las Casas y Aragorri		Juan Vicente de Güemes Pacheco (1789–1794)	No secretary (affairs of Indies distributed among different secretariats)	Count of Aranda (1792); Interim	No regent	Charles IV (1788 –1808)
70	8 July 1790 to 6 December 1796	Luis de las Casas y Aragorri		Juan Vicente de Güemes Pacheco (1789–1794)	No secretary (affairs of Indies distributed among different secretariats)	Manuel Godoy (1792–1798)	No regent	Charles IV (1788 –1808)
70	8 July 1790 to 6 December 1796	Luis de las Casas y Aragorri		Miguel de la Grúa Talamanca (1794–1798)	No secretary (affairs of Indies distributed among different secretariats)	Manuel Godoy (1792–1798)	No regent	Charles IV (1788 –1808)
71	6 December 1796 to 13 May 1799	Juan Procopio de Bassecourt Thieulaine y Bryas López de Ochoa, Count of Santa Clara		Miguel de la Grúa Talamanca (1794–1798)	No secretary (affairs of Indies distributed among different secretariats)	Manuel Godoy (1792–1798)	No regent	Charles IV (1788 –1808)
71	6 December 1796 to 13 May 1799	Juan Procopio de Bassecourt Thieulaine y Bryas López de Ochoa, Count of Santa Clara		Miguel de la Grúa Talamanca (1794–1798)	No secretary (affairs of Indies distributed among different secretariats)	Francisco Saavedra (1798–1799)	No regent	Charles IV (1788 –1808)
71	6 December 1796 to 13 May 1799	Juan Procopio de Bassecourt Thieulaine y Bryas López de Ochoa, Count of Santa Clara		Miguel José de Azanza (1798–1800)	No secretary (affairs of Indies distributed among different secretariats)	Francisco Saavedra (1798–1799)	No regent	Charles IV (1788 –1808)
71	6 December 1796 to 13 May 1799	Juan Procopio de Bassecourt Thieulaine y Bryas López de Ochoa, Count of Santa Clara		Miguel José de Azanza (1798–1800)	No secretary (affairs of Indies distributed among different secretariats)	Mariano Luis de Urquijo (1799)	No regent	Charles IV (1788 –1808)
72	13 May 1799 to 14 April 1812	Salvador José de Muro, 2nd Marquis of Someruelos		Miguel José de Azanza (1798–1800)	No secretary (affairs of Indies distributed among different secretariats)	Pedro Cevallos (1799–1808)	No regent	Charles IV (1788 –1808)
72	13 May 1799 to 14 April 1812	Salvador José de Muro, 2nd Marquis of Someruelos		Félix Berenguer de Marquina (1800–1803)	No secretary (affairs of Indies distributed among different secretariats)	Pedro Cevallos (1799–1808)	No regent	Charles IV (1788 –1808)
72	13 May 1799 to 14 April 1812	Salvador José de Muro, 2nd Marquis of Someruelos		José de Iturrigaray (1803–1808)	No secretary (affairs of Indies distributed among different secretariats)	Pedro Cevallos (1799–1808)	No regent	Charles IV (1788 –1808)
72	13 May 1799 to 14 April 1812	Salvador José de Muro, 2nd Marquis of Someruelos		José de Iturrigaray (1803–1808)	No secretary (affairs of Indies distributed among different secretariats)	Pedro Cevallos (1799–1808)	No regent	Ferdinand VII (1808)
72	13 May 1799 to 14 April 1812	Salvador José de Muro, 2nd Marquis of Someruelos		José de Iturrigaray (1803–1808)	Miguel José de Azanza 1st Duke of Santa Fe(1808–1813) (Note: As Minister of the Indies of Spain)	Mariano Luis de Urquijo (1808–1813)	No regent	Joseph I (1808 –1813)
72	13 May 1799 to 14 April 1812	Salvador José de Muro, 2nd Marquis of Someruelos		Pedro de Garibay (1808–1809) (Note: Loyal to Ferdinand VII during the Spanish War of Independence)	Miguel José de Azanza 1st Duke of Santa Fe(1808–1813)	Mariano Luis de Urquijo (1808–1813)	No regent	Joseph I (1808 –1813)
72	13 May 1799 to 14 April 1812	Salvador José de Muro, 2nd Marquis of Someruelos		Francisco Javier de Lizana Archbishop of Mexico (1809–1810)	Miguel José de Azanza 1st Duke of Santa Fe(1808–1813)	Mariano Luis de Urquijo (1808–1813)	No regent	Joseph I (1808 –1813)
72	13 May 1799 to 14 April 1812	Salvador José de Muro, 2nd Marquis of Someruelos		Pedro Catani (1810)	Miguel José de Azanza 1st Duke of Santa Fe(1808–1813)	Mariano Luis de Urquijo (1808–1813)	No regent	Joseph I (1808 –1813)
72	13 May 1799 to 14 April 1812	Salvador José de Muro, 2nd Marquis of Someruelos		Francisco Javier Venegas (1810–1813)	Miguel José de Azanza 1st Duke of Santa Fe(1808–1813)	Mariano Luis de Urquijo (1808–1813)	No regent	Joseph I (1808 –1813)
73	14 April 1812 to 2 July 1816	Juan Ruíz de Apodaca		Francisco Javier Venegas (1810–1813)	Miguel José de Azanza 1st Duke of Santa Fe(1808–1813)	Mariano Luis de Urquijo (1808–1813)	No regent	Joseph I (1808 –1813)
73	14 April 1812 to 2 July 1816	Juan Ruíz de Apodaca		Félix María Calleja del Rey (1813–1816)	Miguel José de Azanza 1st Duke of Santa Fe(1808–1813)	Mariano Luis de Urquijo (1808–1813)	No regent	Joseph I (1808 –1813)
73	14 April 1812 to 2 July 1816	Juan Ruíz de Apodaca		Félix María Calleja del Rey (1813–1816)	No secretary	Juan O'Donojú (1813); Interim	No regent	Joseph I (1808 –1813)
73	14 April 1812 to 2 July 1816	Juan Ruíz de Apodaca		Félix María Calleja del Rey (1813–1816)	No secretary	Fernando de Laserna (1813); Interim	No regent	Joseph I (1808 –1813)
73	14 April 1812 to 2 July 1816	Juan Ruíz de Apodaca		Félix María Calleja del Rey (1813–1816)	Manuel Antonio de la Bodega y Mollinedo (1813–1814) (Note: As Secretary of State for Overseas Governance)	José Luyando (1813–1814); Interim	No regent	Ferdinand VII(1813 –1833)
73	14 April 1812 to 2 July 1816	Juan Ruíz de Apodaca		Félix María Calleja del Rey (1813–1816)	Miguel de Lardizabal (1814–1815)	José Miguel de Carvajal-Vargas (1814)	No regent	Ferdinand VII(1813 –1833)
73	14 April 1812 to 2 July 1816	Juan Ruíz de Apodaca		Félix María Calleja del Rey (1813–1816)	No secretary	Pedro Cevallos (1814–1816)	No regent	Ferdinand VII(1813 –1833)
73	14 April 1812 to 2 July 1816	Juan Ruíz de Apodaca		Félix María Calleja del Rey (1813–1816)	No secretary	Juan Esteban Lozano de Torres (1816)	No regent	Ferdinand VII(1813 –1833)
73	14 April 1812 to 2 July 1816	Juan Ruíz de Apodaca		Félix María Calleja del Rey (1813–1816)	No secretary	Pedro Cevallos (1816)	No regent	Ferdinand VII(1813 –1833)
74	2 July 1816 to 29 August 1819	José Cienfuegos Jovellanos		Félix María Calleja del Rey (1813–1816)	No secretary	Pedro Cevallos (1816)	No regent	Ferdinand VII(1813 –1833)
74	2 July 1816 to 29 August 1819	José Cienfuegos Jovellanos		Juan Ruiz de Apodaca (1816–1821)	No secretary	Pedro Cevallos (1816)	No regent	Ferdinand VII(1813 –1833)
74	2 July 1816 to 29 August 1819	José Cienfuegos Jovellanos		Juan Ruiz de Apodaca (1816–1821)	No secretary	José García de León (1816–1818)	No regent	Ferdinand VII(1813 –1833)
74	2 July 1816 to 29 August 1819	José Cienfuegos Jovellanos		Juan Ruiz de Apodaca (1816–1821)	No secretary	Carlos Martínez de Irujo (1818–1819); Interim	No regent	Ferdinand VII(1813 –1833)
75	28 August 1819 to 3 March 1821	Juan Manuel de Cagigal y Niño		Juan Ruiz de Apodaca (1816–1821)	No secretary	Carlos Martínez de Irujo (1818–1819); Interim	No regent	Ferdinand VII(1813 –1833)
75	28 August 1819 to 3 March 1821	Juan Manuel de Cagigal y Niño		Juan Ruiz de Apodaca (1816–1821)	No secretary	Manuel González Salmón (1819); Interim	No regent	Ferdinand VII(1813 –1833)
75	28 August 1819 to 3 March 1821	Juan Manuel de Cagigal y Niño		Juan Ruiz de Apodaca (1816–1821)	No secretary	Joaquín José Melgarejo (1819–1820)	No regent	Ferdinand VII(1813 –1833)
75	28 August 1819 to 3 March 1821	Juan Manuel de Cagigal y Niño		Juan Ruiz de Apodaca (1816–1821)	Antonio González Salmón (1820); Interim	Joaquín José Melgarejo (1819–1820)	No regent	Ferdinand VII(1813 –1833)
75	28 August 1819 to 3 March 1821	Juan Manuel de Cagigal y Niño		Juan Ruiz de Apodaca (1816–1821)	Antonio González Salmón (1820); Interim	Juan Jabat Aztal (1820); Interim	No regent	Ferdinand VII(1813 –1833)
75	28 August 1819 to 3 March 1821	Juan Manuel de Cagigal y Niño		Juan Ruiz de Apodaca (1816–1821)	Antonio Porcel Román (1820)	Juan Jabat Aztal (1820); Interim	No regent	Ferdinand VII(1813 –1833)
75	28 August 1819 to 3 March 1821	Juan Manuel de Cagigal y Niño		Juan Ruiz de Apodaca (1816–1821)	Antonio Porcel Román (1820)	Evaristo Pérez de Castro (1820–1821)	No regent	Ferdinand VII(1813 –1833)
75	28 August 1819 to 3 March 1821	Juan Manuel de Cagigal y Niño		Juan Ruiz de Apodaca (1816–1821)	Ramón Gil de la Cuadra (1820–1821)	Evaristo Pérez de Castro (1820–1821)	No regent	Ferdinand VII(1813 –1833)
75	28 August 1819 to 3 March 1821	Juan Manuel de Cagigal y Niño		Juan Ruiz de Apodaca (1816–1821)	Antonio de Guilleman (1821); Interim	Joaquín Anduaga Cuenca (1821); Interim	No regent	Ferdinand VII(1813 –1833)
76	3 March 1821 to 19 July 1822	Nicolás de Mahy y Romo		Juan Ruiz de Apodaca (1816–1821)	Antonio de Guilleman (1821); Interim	Joaquín Anduaga Cuenca (1821); Interim	No regent	Ferdinand VII(1813 –1833)
76	3 March 1821 to 19 July 1822	Nicolás de Mahy y Romo		Francisco Novella Azabal Pérez (1821)	Antonio de Guilleman (1821); Interim	Francisco de Paula Escudero (1821); Interim	No regent	Ferdinand VII(1813 –1833)
76	3 March 1821 to 19 July 1822	Nicolás de Mahy y Romo		Francisco Novella Azabal Pérez (1821)	Ramón Olaguer Feliú (1821)	Francisco de Paula Escudero (1821); Interim	No regent	Ferdinand VII(1813 –1833)
76	3 March 1821 to 19 July 1822	Nicolás de Mahy y Romo		Francisco Novella Azabal Pérez (1821)	Ramón López Pelegrín (1821–1822)	Eusebio Bardají y Azara (1821–1822)	No regent	Ferdinand VII(1813 –1833)
76	3 March 1821 to 19 July 1822	Nicolás de Mahy y Romo		Juan O'Donojú (1821)	Ramón López Pelegrín (1821–1822)	Eusebio Bardají y Azara (1821–1822)	No regent	Ferdinand VII(1813 –1833)
76	3 March 1821 to 19 July 1822	Nicolás de Mahy y Romo		Minister of Overseas (Note: Depending ministry of the Spanish colonies)		Eusebio Bardají y Azara (1821–1822)	No regent	Ferdinand VII(1813 –1833)
76	3 March 1821 to 19 July 1822	Nicolás de Mahy y Romo		Ramón López-Pelegrín (1821–1822)		Eusebio Bardají y Azara (1821–1822)	No regent	Ferdinand VII(1813 –1833)
76	3 March 1821 to 19 July 1822	Nicolás de Mahy y Romo		Ramón López-Pelegrín (1821–1822)		Ramón López-Pelegrín (1822); Interim	No regent	Ferdinand VII(1813 –1833)
76	3 March 1821 to 19 July 1822	Nicolás de Mahy y Romo		Ramón López-Pelegrín (1821–1822)		José Gabriel de Silva (1822)	No regent	Ferdinand VII(1813 –1833)
76	3 March 1821 to 19 July 1822	Nicolás de Mahy y Romo		Ramón López-Pelegrín (1821–1822)		Ramón López-Pelegrín (1822); Interim	No regent	Ferdinand VII(1813 –1833)
76	3 March 1821 to 19 July 1822	Nicolás de Mahy y Romo		Manuel de la Bodega Mollinedo (1822)		Francisco Martínez de la Rosa (1822)	No regent	Ferdinand VII(1813 –1833)
Int.	19 July 1822 to 2 May 1823	Sebastián Kindelán y Oregón	Provisional Governor	Diego Clemencín (1822)		Francisco Martínez de la Rosa (1822)	No regent	Ferdinand VII(1813 –1833)
Int.	19 July 1822 to 2 May 1823	Sebastián Kindelán y Oregón	Provisional Governor	José Manuel de Vadillo (1822–1823)		Evaristo Fernández San Miguel y Valledor (1822–1823); Interim since 28 February 1823	No regent	Ferdinand VII(1813 –1833)
77	2 May 1823 to 15 May 1832	Francisco Dionisio Vives		José Manuel de Vadillo (1822–1823)		José Manuel de Vadillo (1823); Interim	No regent	Ferdinand VII(1813 –1833)
77	2 May 1823 to 15 May 1832	Francisco Dionisio Vives		Pedro Urquinaona (1823)		Santiago Usoz y Mozi (1823); Interim	No regent	Ferdinand VII(1813 –1833)
77	2 May 1823 to 15 May 1832	Francisco Dionisio Vives		Pedro Urquinaona (1823)		José María Pando de la Riva y Ramírez de Laredo (1823)	No regent	Ferdinand VII(1813 –1833)
77	2 May 1823 to 15 May 1832	Francisco Dionisio Vives		Francisco de Paula Ossorio y Vargas (1823) Interim		José María Pando de la Riva y Ramírez de Laredo (1823)	No regent	Ferdinand VII(1813 –1833)
77	2 May 1823 to 15 May 1832	Francisco Dionisio Vives		Francisco de Paula Ossorio y Vargas (1823) Interim		Luis María de Salazar y Salazar (1823); Interim	No regent	Ferdinand VII(1813 –1833)
77	2 May 1823 to 15 May 1832	Francisco Dionisio Vives		No minister (1823–1836)		Luis María de Salazar y Salazar (1823); Interim	No regent	Ferdinand VII(1813 –1833)
77	2 May 1823 to 15 May 1832	Francisco Dionisio Vives		No minister (1823–1836)		Juan Antonio Yandiola Garay (1823); Interim	No regent	Ferdinand VII(1813 –1833)
77	2 May 1823 to 15 May 1832	Francisco Dionisio Vives		No minister (1823–1836)		José Luyando (1823); Interim	No regent	Ferdinand VII(1813 –1833)
77	2 May 1823 to 15 May 1832	Francisco Dionisio Vives		No minister (1823–1836)		Víctor Damián Sáez (1823); Interim until 7 August 1823	No regent	Ferdinand VII(1813 –1833)
77	2 May 1823 to 15 May 1832	Francisco Dionisio Vives		No minister (1823–1836)		Carlos Martínez de Irujo (1823)	No regent	Ferdinand VII(1813 –1833)
77	2 May 1823 to 15 May 1832	Francisco Dionisio Vives		No minister (1823–1836)		Narciso Heredia (1823–1824)	No regent	Ferdinand VII(1813 –1833)
77	2 May 1823 to 15 May 1832	Francisco Dionisio Vives		No minister (1823–1836)		Francisco Cea Bermúdez (1824–1825)	No regent	Ferdinand VII(1813 –1833)
77	2 May 1823 to 15 May 1832	Francisco Dionisio Vives		No minister (1823–1836)		Pedro de Alcántara Álvarez de Toledo (1825–1826)	No regent	Ferdinand VII(1813 –1833)
77	2 May 1823 to 15 May 1832	Francisco Dionisio Vives		No minister (1823–1836)		Manuel González Salmón (1826–1832)	No regent	Ferdinand VII(1813 –1833)
77	2 May 1823 to 15 May 1832	Francisco Dionisio Vives		No minister (1823–1836)		Antonio de Saavedra (1832); Interim	No regent	Ferdinand VII(1813 –1833)
78	15 May 1832 to 1 June 1834	Mariano Ricafort Palacín y Abarca		No minister (1823–1836)		Antonio de Saavedra (1832); Interim	No regent	Ferdinand VII(1813 –1833)
78	15 May 1832 to 1 June 1834	Mariano Ricafort Palacín y Abarca		No minister (1823–1836)		Francisco Cea Bermúdez (1832–1834)	No regent	Ferdinand VII(1813 –1833)
78	15 May 1832 to 1 June 1834	Mariano Ricafort Palacín y Abarca		No minister (1823–1836)		Francisco Cea Bermúdez (1832–1834)	Maria Christina of Two-Sicilies (1833–1840)	Isabella II (1833 –1868)
78	15 May 1832 to 1 June 1834	Mariano Ricafort Palacín y Abarca		No minister (1823–1836)		Francisco Martínez de la Rosa (1834–1835) (Note: As President of the Minsterial Council of Spain)	Maria Christina of Two-Sicilies (1833–1840)	Isabella II (1833 –1868)
79	1 June 1834 to 20 April 1838	Miguel Tacón y Rosique		No minister (1823–1836)		Francisco Martínez de la Rosa (1834–1835)	Maria Christina of Two-Sicilies (1833–1840)	Isabella II (1833 –1868)
79	1 June 1834 to 20 April 1838	Miguel Tacón y Rosique		No minister (1823–1836)		José María Queipo de Llano (1835)	Maria Christina of Two-Sicilies (1833–1840)	Isabella II (1833 –1868)
79	1 June 1834 to 20 April 1838	Miguel Tacón y Rosique		No minister (1823–1836)		Miguel Ricardo de Álava (1835)	Maria Christina of Two-Sicilies (1833–1840)	Isabella II (1833 –1868)
79	1 June 1834 to 20 April 1838	Miguel Tacón y Rosique		No minister (1823–1836)		Juan Álvarez Mendizábal (1835–1836); Interim	Maria Christina of Two-Sicilies (1833–1840)	Isabella II (1833 –1868)
79	1 June 1834 to 20 April 1838	Miguel Tacón y Rosique		No minister (1823–1836)		Francisco Javier de Istúriz (1836)	Maria Christina of Two-Sicilies (1833–1840)	Isabella II (1833 –1868)
79	1 June 1834 to 20 April 1838	Miguel Tacón y Rosique		No minister (1823–1836)		José María Calatrava (1836–1837)	Maria Christina of Two-Sicilies (1833–1840)	Isabella II (1833 –1868)
79	1 June 1834 to 20 April 1838	Miguel Tacón y Rosique		Depending on the Minister of the Navy (1836–1847)		José María Calatrava (1836–1837)	Maria Christina of Two-Sicilies (1833–1840)	Isabella II (1833 –1868)
79	1 June 1834 to 20 April 1838	Miguel Tacón y Rosique		Depending on the Minister of the Navy (1836–1847)		Ildefonso Díez de Rivera (1837); Interim	Maria Christina of Two-Sicilies (1833–1840)	Isabella II (1833 –1868)
79	1 June 1834 to 20 April 1838	Miguel Tacón y Rosique		Depending on the Minister of the Navy (1836–1847)		José María Calatrava (1837)	Maria Christina of Two-Sicilies (1833–1840)	Isabella II (1833 –1868)
79	1 June 1834 to 20 April 1838	Miguel Tacón y Rosique		Depending on the Minister of the Navy (1836–1847)		Baldomero Espartero (1837)	Maria Christina of Two-Sicilies (1833–1840)	Isabella II (1833 –1868)
79	1 June 1834 to 20 April 1838	Miguel Tacón y Rosique		Depending on the Minister of the Navy (1836–1847)		Eusebio Bardají y Azara (1837)	Maria Christina of Two-Sicilies (1833–1840)	Isabella II (1833 –1868)
79	1 June 1834 to 20 April 1838	Miguel Tacón y Rosique		Depending on the Minister of the Navy (1836–1847)		Narciso Heredia (1837–1838)	Maria Christina of Two-Sicilies (1833–1840)	Isabella II (1833 –1868)
80	20 April 1838 to 10 January 1840	Joaquín Ezpeleta Enrile		Depending on the Minister of the Navy (1836–1847)		Narciso Heredia (1837–1838)	Maria Christina of Two-Sicilies (1833–1840)	Isabella II (1833 –1868)
80	20 April 1838 to 10 January 1840	Joaquín Ezpeleta Enrile		Depending on the Minister of the Navy (1836–1847)		Bernardino Fernández de Velasco (1838)	Maria Christina of Two-Sicilies (1833–1840)	Isabella II (1833 –1868)
80	20 April 1838 to 10 January 1840	Joaquín Ezpeleta Enrile		Depending on the Minister of the Navy (1836–1847)		Evaristo Pérez de Castro (1838–1840)	Maria Christina of Two-Sicilies (1833–1840)	Isabella II (1833 –1868)
81	10 January 1840 to 7 March 1841	Pedro de Alcántara Téllez-Girón		Depending on the Minister of the Navy (1836–1847)		Evaristo Pérez de Castro (1838–1840)	Maria Christina of Two-Sicilies (1833–1840)	Isabella II (1833 –1868)
81	10 January 1840 to 7 March 1841	Pedro de Alcántara Téllez-Girón		Depending on the Minister of the Navy (1836–1847)		Antonio González (1840)	Maria Christina of Two-Sicilies (1833–1840)	Isabella II (1833 –1868)
81	10 January 1840 to 7 March 1841	Pedro de Alcántara Téllez-Girón		Depending on the Minister of the Navy (1836–1847)		Valentín Ferraz (1840)	Maria Christina of Two-Sicilies (1833–1840)	Isabella II (1833 –1868)
81	10 January 1840 to 7 March 1841	Pedro de Alcántara Téllez-Girón		Depending on the Minister of the Navy (1836–1847)		Modesto Cortázar (1840); Interim	Maria Christina of Two-Sicilies (1833–1840)	Isabella II (1833 –1868)
81	10 January 1840 to 7 March 1841	Pedro de Alcántara Téllez-Girón		Depending on the Minister of the Navy (1836–1847)		Vicente Sancho (1840)	Maria Christina of Two-Sicilies (1833–1840)	Isabella II (1833 –1868)
81	10 January 1840 to 7 March 1841	Pedro de Alcántara Téllez-Girón		Depending on the Minister of the Navy (1836–1847)		Baldomero Espartero(1840–1841)	Maria Christina of Two-Sicilies (1833–1840)	Isabella II (1833 –1868)
81	10 January 1840 to 7 March 1841	Pedro de Alcántara Téllez-Girón		Depending on the Minister of the Navy (1836–1847)		Baldomero Espartero(1840–1841)	Baldomero Espartero(1840–1843)	Isabella II (1833 –1868)
82	7 March 1841 to 15 September 1843	Jerónimo Valdés		Depending on the Minister of the Navy (1836–1847)		Baldomero Espartero(1840–1841)	Baldomero Espartero(1840–1843)	Isabella II (1833 –1868)
82	7 March 1841 to 15 September 1843	Jerónimo Valdés		Depending on the Minister of the Navy (1836–1847)		Joaquín María Ferrer (1841)	Baldomero Espartero(1840–1843)	Isabella II (1833 –1868)
82	7 March 1841 to 15 September 1843	Jerónimo Valdés		Depending on the Minister of the Navy (1836–1847)		Antonio González (1841–1842)	Baldomero Espartero(1840–1843)	Isabella II (1833 –1868)
82	7 March 1841 to 15 September 1843	Jerónimo Valdés		Depending on the Minister of the Navy (1836–1847)		José Ramón Rodil (1842–1843)	Baldomero Espartero(1840–1843)	Isabella II (1833 –1868)
82	7 March 1841 to 15 September 1843	Jerónimo Valdés		Depending on the Minister of the Navy (1836–1847)		Joaquín María López (1843)	Baldomero Espartero(1840–1843)	Isabella II (1833 –1868)
82	7 March 1841 to 15 September 1843	Jerónimo Valdés		Depending on the Minister of the Navy (1836–1847)		Álvaro Gómez Becerra (1843)	Baldomero Espartero(1840–1843)	Isabella II (1833 –1868)
82	7 March 1841 to 15 September 1843	Jerónimo Valdés		Depending on the Minister of the Navy (1836–1847)		Joaquín María López (1843) (Note: As President of the Provisional Government)		Isabella II (1833 –1868)
Acting	15 September 1843 to 21 October 1843	Francisco Javier de Ulloa	Provisional Governor	Depending on the Minister of the Navy (1836–1847)		Joaquín María López (1843)		Isabella II (1833 –1868)
Acting	15 September 1843 to 21 October 1843	Francisco Javier de Ulloa	Provisional Governor	Depending on the Minister of the Navy (1836–1847)		Salustiano Olózaga (1843)	No regent	Isabella II (1833 –1868)
83	21 October 1843 to 29 March 1848	Leopoldo O'Donnell, Duke of Tetuan		Depending on the Minister of the Navy (1836–1847)		Salustiano Olózaga (1843)	No regent	Isabella II (1833 –1868)
83	21 October 1843 to 29 March 1848	Leopoldo O'Donnell, Duke of Tetuan		Depending on the Minister of the Navy (1836–1847)		Luis González Bravo (1843–1844)	No regent	Isabella II (1833 –1868)
83	21 October 1843 to 29 March 1848	Leopoldo O'Donnell, Duke of Tetuan		Depending on the Minister of the Navy (1836–1847)		Ramón María Narváez (1844–1846)	No regent	Isabella II (1833 –1868)
83	21 October 1843 to 29 March 1848	Leopoldo O'Donnell, Duke of Tetuan		Depending on the Minister of the Navy (1836–1847)		Manuel Pando, 2nd Marquess of Miraflores (1846)	No regent	Isabella II (1833 –1868)
83	21 October 1843 to 29 March 1848	Leopoldo O'Donnell, Duke of Tetuan		Depending on the Minister of the Navy (1836–1847)		Ramón María Narváez (1846)	No regent	Isabella II (1833 –1868)
83	21 October 1843 to 29 March 1848	Leopoldo O'Donnell, Duke of Tetuan		Depending on the Minister of the Navy (1836–1847)		Francisco Javier de Istúriz (1846–1847)	No regent	Isabella II (1833 –1868)
83	21 October 1843 to 29 March 1848	Leopoldo O'Donnell, Duke of Tetuan		Depending on the Minister of the Navy (1836–1847)		Carlos Martínez de Irujo (1847)	No regent	Isabella II (1833 –1868)
83	21 October 1843 to 29 March 1848	Leopoldo O'Donnell, Duke of Tetuan		Depending on the Minister of the Navy (1836–1847)		Joaquín Francisco Pacheco (1847)	No regent	Isabella II (1833 –1868)
83	21 October 1843 to 29 March 1848	Leopoldo O'Donnell, Duke of Tetuan		No minister (1847–1851)		Joaquín Francisco Pacheco (1847)	No regent	Isabella II (1833 –1868)
84	29 March 1848 to 11 November 1850	Federico Roncali		No minister (1847–1851)		Joaquín Francisco Pacheco (1847)	No regent	Isabella II (1833 –1868)
84	29 March 1848 to 11 November 1850	Federico Roncali		No minister (1847–1851)		Florencio García Goyena (1847)	No regent	Isabella II (1833 –1868)
84	29 March 1848 to 11 November 1850	Federico Roncali		No minister (1847–1851)		Ramón María Narváez (1847–1849)	No regent	Isabella II (1833 –1868)
84	29 March 1848 to 11 November 1850	Federico Roncali		No minister (1847–1851)		Serafín María de Sotto (1849)	No regent	Isabella II (1833 –1868)
84	29 March 1848 to 11 November 1850	Federico Roncali		No minister (1847–1851)		Ramón María Narváez (1849–1851)	No regent	Isabella II (1833 –1868)
85	11 November 1850 to 16 April 1852	José Gutiérrez de la Concha	1st Term	No minister (1847–1851)		Ramón María Narváez (1849–1851)	No regent	Isabella II (1833 –1868)
85	11 November 1850 to 16 April 1852	José Gutiérrez de la Concha	1st Term	Juan Bravo Murillo (1851–1852) (Note: Depending on the President of the Council of Ministers as an additional affair.)			No regent	Isabella II (1833 –1868)
86	16 April 1852 to 3 December 1853	Valentín Cañedo		Juan Bravo Murillo (1851–1852)			No regent	Isabella II (1833 –1868)
86	16 April 1852 to 3 December 1853	Valentín Cañedo		Federico Roncali (1852–1853)			No regent	Isabella II (1833 –1868)
86	16 April 1852 to 3 December 1853	Valentín Cañedo		Francisco Lersundi (1853)			No regent	Isabella II (1833 –1868)
87	3 December 1853 to 21 September 1854	Juan González de la Pezuela		Francisco Lersundi (1853)			No regent	Isabella II (1833 –1868)
87	3 December 1853 to 21 September 1854	Juan González de la Pezuela		Luis José Sartorius, Count of San Luis (1853–1854)			No regent	Isabella II (1833 –1868)
87	3 December 1853 to 21 September 1854	Juan González de la Pezuela		Depending on the Minister of State (1854–1856)		Fernando Fernández de Córdova (1854)	No regent	Isabella II (1833 –1868)
87	3 December 1853 to 21 September 1854	Juan González de la Pezuela		Depending on the Minister of State (1854–1856)		Ángel de Saavedra, 3rd Duke of Rivas (1854)	No regent	Isabella II (1833 –1868)
87	3 December 1853 to 21 September 1854	Juan González de la Pezuela		Depending on the Minister of State (1854–1856)		Baldomero Espartero(1854–1856)	No regent	Isabella II (1833 –1868)
88	21 September 1854 to 24 November 1859	José Gutiérrez de la Concha	2nd Term	Depending on the Minister of State (1854–1856)		Baldomero Espartero(1854–1856)	No regent	Isabella II (1833 –1868)
88	21 September 1854 to 24 November 1859	José Gutiérrez de la Concha	2nd Term	No minister (1856)		Baldomero Espartero(1854–1856)	No regent	Isabella II (1833 –1868)
88	21 September 1854 to 24 November 1859	José Gutiérrez de la Concha	2nd Term	Depending on the Minister of Development (1856–1858)		Baldomero Espartero(1854–1856)	No regent	Isabella II (1833 –1868)
88	21 September 1854 to 24 November 1859	José Gutiérrez de la Concha	2nd Term	Depending on the Minister of State (1858)		Leopoldo O'Donnell (1856)	No regent	Isabella II (1833 –1868)
88	21 September 1854 to 24 November 1859	José Gutiérrez de la Concha	2nd Term	Depending on the Minister of State (1858)		Ramón María Narváez (1856–1857)	No regent	Isabella II (1833 –1868)
88	21 September 1854 to 24 November 1859	José Gutiérrez de la Concha	2nd Term	Depending on the Minister of State (1858)		Francisco Armero Peñaranda (1857–1858)	No regent	Isabella II (1833 –1868)
88	21 September 1854 to 24 November 1859	José Gutiérrez de la Concha	2nd Term	Depending on the Minister of State (1858)		Francisco Javier de Istúriz (1858)	No regent	Isabella II (1833 –1868)
88	21 September 1854 to 24 November 1859	José Gutiérrez de la Concha	2nd Term	Leopoldo O'Donnell (1858–1863) (Note: Depending on the Overseas over the President of the Council of Ministers as an additional affair.)			No regent	Isabella II (1833 –1868)
89	24 November 1859 to 10 December 1862	Francisco Serrano y Domínguez, Duke of la Torre		Leopoldo O'Donnell (1858–1863)			No regent	Isabella II (1833 –1868)
90	10 December 1862 to 30 May 1866	Domingo Dulce	1st Term	Leopoldo O'Donnell (1858–1863)			No regent	Isabella II (1833 –1868)
90	10 December 1862 to 30 May 1866	Domingo Dulce	1st Term	Manuel Pando, 2nd Marquess of Miraflores (1863)		Manuel Pando, 2nd Marquess of Miraflores (1863–1864)	No regent	Isabella II (1833 –1868)
90	10 December 1862 to 30 May 1866	Domingo Dulce	1st Term	José Gutiérrez de la Concha, 1st Marquess of Havana (1863) Interim		Manuel Pando, 2nd Marquess of Miraflores (1863–1864)	No regent	Isabella II (1833 –1868)
90	10 December 1862 to 30 May 1866	Domingo Dulce	1st Term	Francisco Permanyer Tuyets (1863)		Manuel Pando, 2nd Marquess of Miraflores (1863–1864)	No regent	Isabella II (1833 –1868)
90	10 December 1862 to 30 May 1866	Domingo Dulce	1st Term	José Gutiérrez de la Concha, 1st Marquess of Havana (1863–1864) Interim		Manuel Pando, 2nd Marquess of Miraflores (1863–1864)	No regent	Isabella II (1833 –1868)
90	10 December 1862 to 30 May 1866	Domingo Dulce	1st Term	Alejandro de Castro y Casal (1864)		Lorenzo Arrazola (1864)	No regent	Isabella II (1833 –1868)
90	10 December 1862 to 30 May 1866	Domingo Dulce	1st Term	Diego López Ballesteros (1864)		Alejandro Mon y Menéndez (1864)	No regent	Isabella II (1833 –1868)
90	10 December 1862 to 30 May 1866	Domingo Dulce	1st Term	Manuel Seijas Lozano (1864–1865)		Ramón María Narváez (1864–1865)	No regent	Isabella II (1833 –1868)
90	10 December 1862 to 30 May 1866	Domingo Dulce	1st Term	Antonio Cánovas del Castillo (1865–1866)		Leopoldo O'Donnell (1865–1866)	No regent	Isabella II (1833 –1868)
91	30 May 1866 to 3 November 1866	Francisco de Lersundi y Ormaechea	1st Term	Antonio Cánovas del Castillo (1865–1866)		Leopoldo O'Donnell (1865–1866)	No regent	Isabella II (1833 –1868)
91	30 May 1866 to 3 November 1866	Francisco de Lersundi y Ormaechea	1st Term	Alejandro de Castro y Casal (1866–1867)		Ramón María Narváez (1866–1867)	No regent	Isabella II (1833 –1868)
92	3 November 1866 to 24 September 1867	Joaquín del Manzano		Alejandro de Castro y Casal (1866–1867)		Ramón María Narváez (1866–1867)	No regent	Isabella II (1833 –1868)
Int.	24 September 1867 to 21 December 1867	Blas Villate	1st Term (Provisional governor)	Alejandro de Castro y Casal (1866–1867)		Ramón María Narváez (1866–1867)	No regent	Isabella II (1833 –1868)
Int.	24 September 1867 to 21 December 1867	Blas Villate	1st Term (Provisional governor)	Carlos Marfori y Callejas (1867–1868)		Ramón María Narváez (1866–1867)	No regent	Isabella II (1833 –1868)
93	21 December 1867 to 4 January 1869	Francisco de Lersundi y Ormaechea	2nd Term	Carlos Marfori y Callejas (1867–1868)		Ramón María Narváez (1866–1867)	No regent	Isabella II (1833 –1868)
93	21 December 1867 to 4 January 1869	Francisco de Lersundi y Ormaechea	2nd Term	Carlos Marfori y Callejas (1867–1868)		Luis González Bravo (1868)	No regent	Isabella II (1833 –1868)
93	21 December 1867 to 4 January 1869	Francisco de Lersundi y Ormaechea	2nd Term	Tomás Rodríguez Rubí (1868)		José Gutiérrez de la Concha, 1st Marquess of Havana (1868)	No regent	Isabella II (1833 –1868)
93	21 December 1867 to 4 January 1869	Francisco de Lersundi y Ormaechea	2nd Term	José Nacarino Bravo (1868)		José Gutiérrez de la Concha, 1st Marquess of Havana (1868)	No regent	Isabella II (1833 –1868)
93	21 December 1867 to 4 January 1869	Francisco de Lersundi y Ormaechea	2nd Term	Adelardo López de Ayala (1868–1869)		Francisco Serrano (1868 –1869)	Francisco Serrano (1868 –1871)	
94	4 January 1869 to 2 June 1869	Domingo Dulce	2nd Term	Adelardo López de Ayala (1868–1869)		Francisco Serrano (1868 –1869)	Francisco Serrano (1868 –1871)	
94	4 January 1869 to 2 June 1869	Domingo Dulce	2nd Term	Juan Bautista Topete (1869) Interim		Francisco Serrano (1868 –1869)	Francisco Serrano (1868 –1871)	
Acting	2 June 1869 to 28 June 1869	Felipe Ginovés del Espinar	Provisional Governor	Juan Bautista Topete (1869) Interim		Francisco Serrano (1868 –1869)	Francisco Serrano (1868 –1871)	
Acting	2 June 1869 to 28 June 1869	Felipe Ginovés del Espinar	Provisional Governor	Juan Bautista Topete (1869) Interim		Juan Prim (1869–1870)	Francisco Serrano (1868 –1871)	
95	28 June 1869 to 13 December 1870	Antonio Caballero y Fernández de Rodas		Juan Bautista Topete (1869) Interim		Juan Prim (1869–1870)	Francisco Serrano (1868 –1871)	
95	28 June 1869 to 13 December 1870	Antonio Caballero y Fernández de Rodas		Manuel Becerra y Bermúdez (1869–1870)		Juan Prim (1869–1870)	Francisco Serrano (1868 –1871)	
95	28 June 1869 to 13 December 1870	Antonio Caballero y Fernández de Rodas		Segismundo Moret (1870)		Juan Prim (1869–1870)	Francisco Serrano (1868 –1871)	
96	13 December 1870 to 11 July 1872	Blas Villate	2nd Term	Segismundo Moret (1870)		Juan Prim (1869–1870)	Francisco Serrano (1868 –1871)	
96	13 December 1870 to 11 July 1872	Blas Villate	2nd Term	Adelardo López de Ayala (1870–1871)		Juan Bautista Topete (1870–1871); Interim	Francisco Serrano (1868 –1871)	
96	13 December 1870 to 11 July 1872	Blas Villate	2nd Term	Adelardo López de Ayala (1870–1871)		Francisco Serrano (1871)	No regent	Amadeo I (1871 –1873)
96	13 December 1870 to 11 July 1872	Blas Villate	2nd Term	Tomás Mosquera (1871)		Manuel Ruiz Zorrilla (1871)	No regent	Amadeo I (1871 –1873)
96	13 December 1870 to 11 July 1872	Blas Villate	2nd Term	Víctor Balaguer (1871)		José Malcampo (1871)	No regent	Amadeo I (1871 –1873)
96	13 December 1870 to 11 July 1872	Blas Villate	2nd Term	Juan Bautista Topete (1871–1872)		Práxedes Mateo Sagasta (1871–1872)	No regent	Amadeo I (1871 –1873)
96	13 December 1870 to 11 July 1872	Blas Villate	2nd Term	Cristóbal Martín de Herrera (1872)		Práxedes Mateo Sagasta (1871–1872)	No regent	Amadeo I (1871 –1873)
96	13 December 1870 to 11 July 1872	Blas Villate	2nd Term	Adelardo López de Ayala (1872)		Francisco Serrano (1872)	No regent	Amadeo I (1871 –1873)
96	13 December 1870 to 11 July 1872	Blas Villate	2nd Term	Eduardo Gasset y Artime (1872)		Manuel Ruiz Zorrilla (1872–1873)	No regent	Amadeo I (1871 –1873)
97	11 July 1872 to 18 April 1873	Francisco Ceballos y Vargas		Eduardo Gasset y Artime (1872)		Manuel Ruiz Zorrilla (1872–1873)	No regent	Amadeo I (1871 –1873)
97	11 July 1872 to 18 April 1873	Francisco Ceballos y Vargas		Tomás Mosquera (1872–1873)		Manuel Ruiz Zorrilla (1872–1873)	No regent	Amadeo I (1871 –1873)
97	11 July 1872 to 18 April 1873	Francisco Ceballos y Vargas		Francisco Salmerón y Alonso (1873)		Estanislao Figueras (1873) (Note: As President of the Executive Power)	No regent	President
97	11 July 1872 to 18 April 1873	Francisco Ceballos y Vargas		Francisco Salmerón y Alonso (1873)		Estanislao Figueras (1873)	No regent	Estanislao Figueras (1873)
97	11 July 1872 to 18 April 1873	Francisco Ceballos y Vargas		José Cristóbal Sorní (1873)		Estanislao Figueras (1873)	No regent	Estanislao Figueras (1873)
98	18 April 1873 to 4 November 1873	Cándido Pieltaín		José Cristóbal Sorní (1873)		Francesc Pi i Margall (1873)	No regent	Francesc Pi i Margall (1873)
98	18 April 1873 to 4 November 1873	Cándido Pieltaín		Francisco Suñer (1873)		Francesc Pi i Margall (1873)	No regent	Francesc Pi i Margall (1873)
98	18 April 1873 to 4 November 1873	Cándido Pieltaín		Eduardo Palanca (1873)		Nicolás Salmerón (1873)	No regent	Nicolás Salmerón (1873)
98	18 April 1873 to 4 November 1873	Cándido Pieltaín		Santiago Soler y Pla (1873–1874)		Emilio Castelar (1873–1874)	No regent	Emilio Castelar (1873–1874)
99	4 November 1873 to 6 April 1874	Joaquín Jovellar y Soler	1st Term	Santiago Soler y Pla (1873–1874)		Emilio Castelar (1873–1874)	No regent	Emilio Castelar (1873–1874)
99	4 November 1873 to 6 April 1874	Joaquín Jovellar y Soler	1st Term	Víctor Balaguer (1874)		Francisco Serrano (1874)	No regent	Francisco Serrano President (1874)
99	4 November 1873 to 6 April 1874	Joaquín Jovellar y Soler	1st Term	Víctor Balaguer (1874)		Juan Zavala (1874)	No regent	Francisco Serrano President (1874)
99	4 November 1873 to 6 April 1874	Joaquín Jovellar y Soler	1st Term	Antonio Romero Ortiz (1874)		Juan Zavala (1874)	No regent	Francisco Serrano President (1874)
100	6 April 1874 to 1 March 1875	José Gutiérrez de la Concha	3rd Term	Antonio Romero Ortiz (1874)		Práxedes Mateo Sagasta (1874)	No regent	Francisco Serrano President (1874)
100	6 April 1874 to 1 March 1875	José Gutiérrez de la Concha	3rd Term	Adelardo López de Ayala (1874–1877)		Antonio Cánovas del Castillo (1874–1875)	Antonio Cánovas del Castillo (1874–1875)	Monarch
100	6 April 1874 to 1 March 1875	José Gutiérrez de la Concha	3rd Term	Adelardo López de Ayala (1874–1877)		Antonio Cánovas del Castillo (1874–1875)	No regency	Alfonso XII (1874–1885)
Acting	1 March 1875 to 8 March 1875	Cayetano Figueroa y Garahondo	1st Term (Provisional Governor)	Adelardo López de Ayala (1874–1877)		Antonio Cánovas del Castillo (1874–1875)	No regency	Alfonso XII (1874–1885)
Acting	1 March 1875 to 8 March 1875	Cayetano Figueroa y Garahondo	1st Term (Provisional Governor)	Adelardo López de Ayala (1874–1877)		Joaquín Jovellar (1875)	No regency	Alfonso XII (1874–1885)
101	8 March 1875 to 18 January 1876	Blas Villate	3rd Term	Adelardo López de Ayala (1874–1877)		Joaquín Jovellar (1875)	No regency	Alfonso XII (1874–1885)
101	8 March 1875 to 18 January 1876	Blas Villate	3rd Term	Adelardo López de Ayala (1874–1877)		Antonio Cánovas del Castillo (1875–1879)	No regency	Alfonso XII (1874–1885)
102	18 January 1876 to 18 June 1878	Joaquín Jovellar y Soler	2nd Term	Adelardo López de Ayala (1874–1877)		Antonio Cánovas del Castillo (1875–1879)	No regency	Alfonso XII (1874–1885)
102	18 January 1876 to 18 June 1878	Joaquín Jovellar y Soler	2nd Term	Cristóbal Martín de Herrera (1877–1878)		Antonio Cánovas del Castillo (1875–1879)	No regency	Alfonso XII (1874–1885)
102	18 January 1876 to 18 June 1878	Joaquín Jovellar y Soler	2nd Term	José Elduayen Gorriti (1878–1879)		Antonio Cánovas del Castillo (1875–1879)	No regency	Alfonso XII (1874–1885)
103	18 June 1878 to 5 February 1879	Arsenio Martínez Campos	1st Term	José Elduayen Gorriti (1878–1879)		Antonio Cánovas del Castillo (1875–1879)	No regency	Alfonso XII (1874–1885)
Acting	5 February 1879 to 17 April 1879	Cayetano Figueroa y Garahondo	2nd Term (Provisional Governor)	José Elduayen Gorriti (1878–1879)		Antonio Cánovas del Castillo (1875–1879)	No regency	Alfonso XII (1874–1885)
Acting	5 February 1879 to 17 April 1879	Cayetano Figueroa y Garahondo	2nd Term (Provisional Governor)	Manuel Orovio Echagüe (1879) Interim		Arsenio Martínez-Campos (1879)	No regency	Alfonso XII (1874–1885)
Acting	5 February 1879 to 17 April 1879	Cayetano Figueroa y Garahondo	2nd Term (Provisional Governor)	Salvador Albacete (1879)		Arsenio Martínez-Campos (1879)	No regency	Alfonso XII (1874–1885)
104	17 April 1879 to 28 November 1881	Ramón Blanco y Erenas, Marquis of Peña Plata	1st Term	Salvador Albacete (1879)		Arsenio Martínez-Campos (1879)	No regency	Alfonso XII (1874–1885)
104	17 April 1879 to 28 November 1881	Ramón Blanco y Erenas, Marquis of Peña Plata	1st Term	José Elduayen Gorriti (1879–1880)		Antonio Cánovas del Castillo (1879–1881)	No regency	Alfonso XII (1874–1885)
104	17 April 1879 to 28 November 1881	Ramón Blanco y Erenas, Marquis of Peña Plata	1st Term	Cayetano Sánchez Bustillo (1880–1881)		Antonio Cánovas del Castillo (1879–1881)	No regency	Alfonso XII (1874–1885)
104	17 April 1879 to 28 November 1881	Ramón Blanco y Erenas, Marquis of Peña Plata	1st Term	Fernando León y Castillo (1881–1883)		Práxedes Mateo Sagasta (1881–1883)	No regency	Alfonso XII (1874–1885)
105	28 November 1881 to 5 August 1883	Luis Prendergast y Gordon, Marquis of Victoria de las Tunas		Fernando León y Castillo (1881–1883)		Práxedes Mateo Sagasta (1881–1883)	No regency	Alfonso XII (1874–1885)
105	28 November 1881 to 5 August 1883	Luis Prendergast y Gordon, Marquis of Victoria de las Tunas		Gaspar Núñez de Arce (1883)		Práxedes Mateo Sagasta (1881–1883)	No regency	Alfonso XII (1874–1885)
Acting	5 August 1883 to 28 September 1883	Tomás y Regna	Provisional Governor	Gaspar Núñez de Arce (1883)		Práxedes Mateo Sagasta (1881–1883)	No regency	Alfonso XII (1874–1885)
106	28 September 1883 to 8 November 1884	Ignacio María del Castillo		Gaspar Núñez de Arce (1883)		Práxedes Mateo Sagasta (1881–1883)	No regency	Alfonso XII (1874–1885)
106	28 September 1883 to 8 November 1884	Ignacio María del Castillo		Estanislao Suárez Inclán (1883–1884)		José Posada Herrera (1883–1884)	No regency	Alfonso XII (1874–1885)
106	28 September 1883 to 8 November 1884	Ignacio María del Castillo		Manuel Aguirre de Tejada (1884–1885)		Antonio Cánovas del Castillo (1884–1885)	No regency	Alfonso XII (1874–1885)
107	8 November 1884 to 25 March 1886	Ramón Fajardo e Izquierdo		Manuel Aguirre de Tejada (1884–1885)		Antonio Cánovas del Castillo (1884–1885)	No regency	Alfonso XII (1874–1885)
107	8 November 1884 to 25 March 1886	Ramón Fajardo e Izquierdo		Germán Gamazo (1885–1886)		Práxedes Mateo Sagasta (1885–1890)	Maria Christina of Austria (1885–1902)	Vacant
108	25 March 1886 to 15 July 1887	Emilio Calleja	1st Term	Germán Gamazo (1885–1886)		Práxedes Mateo Sagasta (1885–1890)	Maria Christina of Austria (1885–1902)	Alfonso XIII (1886–1931)
108	25 March 1886 to 15 July 1887	Emilio Calleja	1st Term	Víctor Balaguer (1886–1888)		Práxedes Mateo Sagasta (1885–1890)	Maria Christina of Austria (1885–1902)	Alfonso XIII (1886–1931)
109	15 July 1887 to 13 March 1889	Sabas Marín y González	1st Term	Víctor Balaguer (1886–1888)		Práxedes Mateo Sagasta (1885–1890)	Maria Christina of Austria (1885–1902)	Alfonso XIII (1886–1931)
109	15 July 1887 to 13 March 1889	Sabas Marín y González	1st Term	Trinitario Ruiz Capdepón (1888)		Práxedes Mateo Sagasta (1885–1890)	Maria Christina of Austria (1885–1902)	Alfonso XIII (1886–1931)
109	15 July 1887 to 13 March 1889	Sabas Marín y González	1st Term	Manuel Becerra y Bermúdez (1888–1890)		Práxedes Mateo Sagasta (1885–1890)	Maria Christina of Austria (1885–1902)	Alfonso XIII (1886–1931)
110	13 March 1889 to 6 February 1890	Manuel Salamanca y Negrete		Manuel Becerra y Bermúdez (1888–1890)		Práxedes Mateo Sagasta (1885–1890)	Maria Christina of Austria (1885–1902)	Alfonso XIII (1886–1931)
Int.	6 February 1890 to 4 April 1890	José Sánchez y Gómez	Provisional Governor	Manuel Becerra y Bermúdez (1888–1890)		Práxedes Mateo Sagasta (1885–1890)	Maria Christina of Austria (1885–1902)	Alfonso XIII (1886–1931)
111	4 April 1890 to 24 August 1890	José Chinchilla		Manuel Becerra y Bermúdez (1888–1890)		Práxedes Mateo Sagasta (1885–1890)	Maria Christina of Austria (1885–1902)	Alfonso XIII (1886–1931)
111	4 April 1890 to 24 August 1890	José Chinchilla		Antonio María Fabié (1890–1891)		Antonio Cánovas del Castillo (1890–1892)	Maria Christina of Austria (1885–1902)	Alfonso XIII (1886–1931)
112	24 August 1890 to 20 June 1892	Camilo de Polavieja		Antonio María Fabié (1890–1891)		Antonio Cánovas del Castillo (1890–1892)	Maria Christina of Austria (1885–1902)	Alfonso XIII (1886–1931)
112	24 August 1890 to 20 June 1892	Camilo de Polavieja		Francisco Romero Robledo (1891–1892)		Antonio Cánovas del Castillo (1890–1892)	Maria Christina of Austria (1885–1902)	Alfonso XIII (1886–1931)
113	20 June 1892 to 15 July 1893	Alejandro Rodríguez Arias y Rodulfo		Francisco Romero Robledo (1891–1892)		Antonio Cánovas del Castillo (1890–1892)	Maria Christina of Austria (1885–1902)	Alfonso XIII (1886–1931)
113	20 June 1892 to 15 July 1893	Alejandro Rodríguez Arias y Rodulfo		Antonio Maura (1892–1894)		Práxedes Mateo Sagasta (1892–1895)	Maria Christina of Austria (1885–1902)	Alfonso XIII (1886–1931)
Int.	15 July 1893 to 16 September 1893	José Arderius	Provisional Governor	Antonio Maura (1892–1894)		Práxedes Mateo Sagasta (1892–1895)	Maria Christina of Austria (1885–1902)	Alfonso XIII (1886–1931)
114	16 September 1893 to 16 April 1895	Emilio Calleja	2nd Term	Antonio Maura (1892–1894)		Práxedes Mateo Sagasta (1892–1895)	Maria Christina of Austria (1885–1902)	Alfonso XIII (1886–1931)
114	16 September 1893 to 16 April 1895	Emilio Calleja	2nd Term	Manuel Becerra y Bermúdez (1894)		Práxedes Mateo Sagasta (1892–1895)	Maria Christina of Austria (1885–1902)	Alfonso XIII (1886–1931)
114	16 September 1893 to 16 April 1895	Emilio Calleja	2nd Term	Buenaventura Ábarzuza Ferrer (1894–1895)		Práxedes Mateo Sagasta (1892–1895)	Maria Christina of Austria (1885–1902)	Alfonso XIII (1886–1931)
114	16 September 1893 to 16 April 1895	Emilio Calleja	2nd Term	Tomás Castellano y Villarroya (1895–1897)		Antonio Cánovas del Castillo (1895–1897)	Maria Christina of Austria (1885–1902)	Alfonso XIII (1886–1931)
115	16 April 1895 to 20 January 1896	Arsenio Martínez Campos	2nd Term	Tomás Castellano y Villarroya (1895–1897)		Antonio Cánovas del Castillo (1895–1897)	Maria Christina of Austria (1885–1902)	Alfonso XIII (1886–1931)
Acting	20 January 1896 to 11 February 1896	Sabas Marín y González	2nd Term (Provisional Governor)	Tomás Castellano y Villarroya (1895–1897)		Antonio Cánovas del Castillo (1895–1897)	Maria Christina of Austria (1885–1902)	Alfonso XIII (1886–1931)
116	11 February 1896 to 31 October 1897	Valeriano Weyler y Nicolau, Marquis of Tenerife		Tomás Castellano y Villarroya (1895–1897)		Antonio Cánovas del Castillo (1895–1897)	Maria Christina of Austria (1885–1902)	Alfonso XIII (1886–1931)
116	11 February 1896 to 31 October 1897	Valeriano Weyler y Nicolau, Marquis of Tenerife		Tomás Castellano y Villarroya (1895–1897)		Marcelo Azcarraga Palmero (1897)	Maria Christina of Austria (1885–1902)	Alfonso XIII (1886–1931)
116	11 February 1896 to 31 October 1897	Valeriano Weyler y Nicolau, Marquis of Tenerife		Segismundo Moret (1897–1898)		Práxedes Mateo Sagasta (1897–1899)	Maria Christina of Austria (1885–1902)	Alfonso XIII (1886–1931)
117	31 October 1897 to 30 November 1898	Ramón Blanco y Erenas, Marquis of Peña Plata	2nd Term	Segismundo Moret (1897–1898)		Práxedes Mateo Sagasta (1897–1899)	Maria Christina of Austria (1885–1902)	Alfonso XIII (1886–1931)
117	31 October 1897 to 30 November 1898	Ramón Blanco y Erenas, Marquis of Peña Plata	2nd Term	Vicente Romero Girón (1898–1899)		Práxedes Mateo Sagasta (1897–1899)	Maria Christina of Austria (1885–1902)	Alfonso XIII (1886–1931)
118	30 November 1898 to 1 January 1899	Adolfo Jiménez Castellanos		Vicente Romero Girón (1898–1899)		Práxedes Mateo Sagasta (1897–1899)	Maria Christina of Austria (1885–1902)	Alfonso XIII (1886–1931)
	American Suzerainty			Secretary of War (Note: Responsible to the Bureau of Insular Affairs regarding Cuba after the April 11, 1899 ratification of the 1898 Treaty of Paris.)		USA Vice President	USA President	
1	1 January 1899 to 23 December 1899	John Rutter Brooke		Russell A. Alger (1897–1899)		Garret Hobart (1895–1899)	Wiliam McKinley (1897–1901)	
1	1 January 1899 to 23 December 1899	John Rutter Brooke		Elihu Root (1899–1904)		Vacant	Wiliam McKinley (1897–1901)	
2	23 December 1899 to 20 May 1902	Leonard Wood		Elihu Root (1899–1904)		Vacant	Wiliam McKinley (1897–1901)	
2	23 December 1899 to 20 May 1902	Leonard Wood		Elihu Root (1899–1904)		Theodore Roosevelt (1901)	Wiliam McKinley (1897–1901)	
2	23 December 1899 to 20 May 1902	Leonard Wood		Elihu Root (1899–1904)		Vacant	Theodore Roosevelt (1901–1909)	
	Republic of Cuba							
	20 May 1902 to 29 September 1906	See List of Presidents of Cuba						
	American Occupation			Secretary of War		USA Vice President	USA President	
Acting	29 September 1906 to 13 October 1906	William Howard Taft	Provisional governor	William Howard Taft (1904–1908)		Charles W. Fairbanks (1905–1909)	Theodore Roosevelt (1901–1909)	
Acting	13 October 1906 to 28 January 1909	Charles Edward Magoon	Provisional governor	William Howard Taft (1904–1908)		Charles W. Fairbanks (1905–1909)	Theodore Roosevelt (1901–1909)	
Acting	13 October 1906 to 28 January 1909	Charles Edward Magoon	Provisional governor	Luke Edward Wright (1908–1909)		Charles W. Fairbanks (1905–1909)	Theodore Roosevelt (1901–1909)	

For continuation after independence see List of presidents of Cuba.

== See also ==
- List of governors of Provincia de Santiago de Cuba
- Timeline of Cuban history
