= José Gutiérrez de la Concha, 1st Marquis of Havana =

Spanish noble, general and politician

The Most Excellent General José Gutiérrez de la Concha e Irigoyen 1st Marquess of La Habana 1st Viscount of Cuba GE
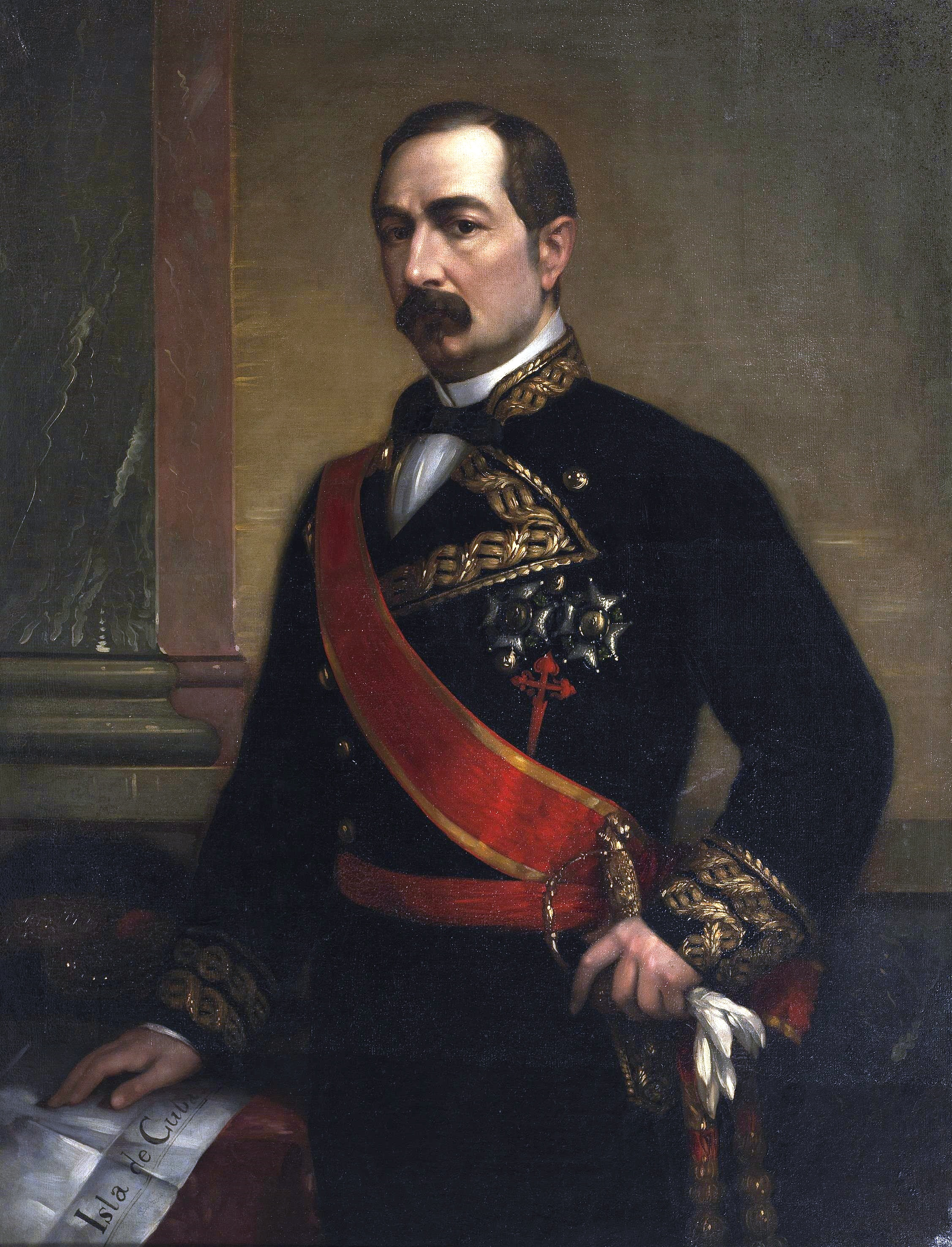

Prime Minister of Spain
- In office 19 September 1868 – 30 September 1868
- Monarch: Isabella II
- Preceded by: Luis Gonzalez-Bravo
- Succeeded by: Pascual Madoz

President of the Senate of Spain
- In office 18 September 1881 – 26 July 1883
- Monarch: Alfonso XII
- Preceded by: Manuel García Barzanallana
- Succeeded by: Francisco Serrano
- In office 8 May 1886 – 29 December 1890
- Monarch: Alfonso XIII
- Preceded by: Arsenio Martínez-Campos
- Succeeded by: Arsenio Martínez-Campos
- In office 3 April 1893 – 16 October 1894
- Monarch: Alfonso XIII
- Preceded by: Arsenio Martínez Campos
- Succeeded by: Eugenio Montero Ríos

Minister of Overseas of Spain
- Interim; 20 May – 6 August 1863
- Monarch: Isabella II
- Prime Minister: Marquess of Miraflores
- Preceded by: Marquess of Miraflores
- Succeeded by: Francisco Permanyer Tuyets
- Interim; 29 November 1863 – 17 January 1864
- Monarch: Isabella II
- Prime Minister: Marquess of Miraflores
- Preceded by: Francisco Permanyer Tuyets
- Succeeded by: Alejandro de Castro y Casal

Minister of War of Spain
- In office 2 March 1863 – 17 January 1864
- Monarch: Isabella II
- Prime Minister: Marquess of Mirafores
- Preceded by: Leopoldo O'Donnell
- Succeeded by: Francisco Lersundi Hormaechea
- In office 19 September – 30 September 1868
- Monarch: Isabella II
- Prime Minister: Himself
- Preceded by: Rafael Meyalde
- Succeeded by: Juan Prim

Minister of the Navy of Spain
- Interim; 19 September – 21 September 1868
- Monarch: Isabella II
- Prime Minister: Himself
- Preceded by: Martín Belda
- Succeeded by: Antonio Estrada González Guiral

Governor of Cuba
- In office 11 November 1850 – 16 April 1852
- Monarch: Isabella II
- Prime Minister: Ramón María Narváez; Juan Bravo Murillo
- Minister of Overseas (Note: Depending on the President of the Council of Ministers as an additional affair.): Juan Bravo Murillo
- Preceded by: Federico Roncali
- Succeeded by: Valentin Cañedo
- In office 21 September 1854 – 24 November 1859
- Monarch: Isabella II
- Prime Minister: Baldomero Espartero; Leopoldo O'Donnell; Ramón María Narváez; Francisco Armero; Francisco Javier de Istúriz; Saturnino Calderón Collantes (as interim)
- Minister of Overseas: Francisco Javier de Istúriz; Leopoldo O'Donnell
- Preceded by: Juan de la Pezuela y Cevallos
- Succeeded by: Francisco Serrano
- In office 6 April 1874 – 1 March 1875
- Monarch: Alfonso XII (Note: As head of state since 9 January 1875)
- President: Francisco Serrano (Note: As head of state until 31 December 1874)
- Prime Minister: Francisco Serrano; Juan Zavala de la Puente; Práxedes Mateo Sagasta; Antonio Cánovas del Castillo
- President of the Ministry-Regency: Antonio Cánovas del Castillo (Note: As head of state and government since 31 December 1874 until 9 January 1875, but he continued as head of government under the title of President of the Council of Ministers.)
- Minister of Overseas: Tomás Mosquera; Antonio Romero Ortiz; Adelardo López de Ayala
- Preceded by: Joaquín Jovellar y Soler
- Succeeded by: Cayetano Figueroa y Garahondo

Personal details
- Born: José Gutiérrez de la Concha e Irigoyen; 4 June 1809 Córdoba, Viceroyalty of the Río de la Plata, Spanish Empire
- Died: 5 November 1895 (aged 86) Madrid, Spain
- Other political affiliations: Moderate Party
- Spouse: Vicenta Fernández de Luco y Santa Cruz (1841–1895)
- Relations: Manuel Gutiérrez de la Concha, Marquis of the Duero (brother)
- Parent(s): Juan Antonio Gutiérrez de la Concha (father); Petra Irigoyen (mother)
- Cabinet: Cabinet of José Gutiérrez de la Concha
- Awards: Orden de Santiago; Legion of Honour; Royal and Military Order of Saint Hermenegild; Laureate Cross of Saint Ferdinand; Order of the Golden Fleece

Military service
- Allegiance: (Restoration (Spain)) Spain (Restoration (Spain)) Captaincy General of Cuba
- Branch/service: Spanish Army
- Years of service: 1822–1841; 1843–1875
- Rank: Captain general of the Army
- Battles/wars: First Carlist War October 1841 pronunciamiento Lopez Expedition

José Gutiérrez de la Concha e Irigoyen, 1st Marquis of Havana, 1st Viscount of Cuba, Grandee of Spain (Córdoba, Viceroyalty of the Río de la Plata, 4 June 1809 – Madrid, Spain, 5 November 1895) was a Spanish noble, general, and politician who served three times as Captain General of Cuba and once as the Prime Minister of Spain.

He was born in Córdoba, then part of the Viceroyalty of River Plate in the Spanish Empire.

In 1851, while in command in Cuba, he defeated the Lopez Expedition, a filibustering attempt to seize the island.
