= Francisco de Lersundi y Hormaechea =

Spanish noble and politician

The Most Excellent Francisco de Lersundi
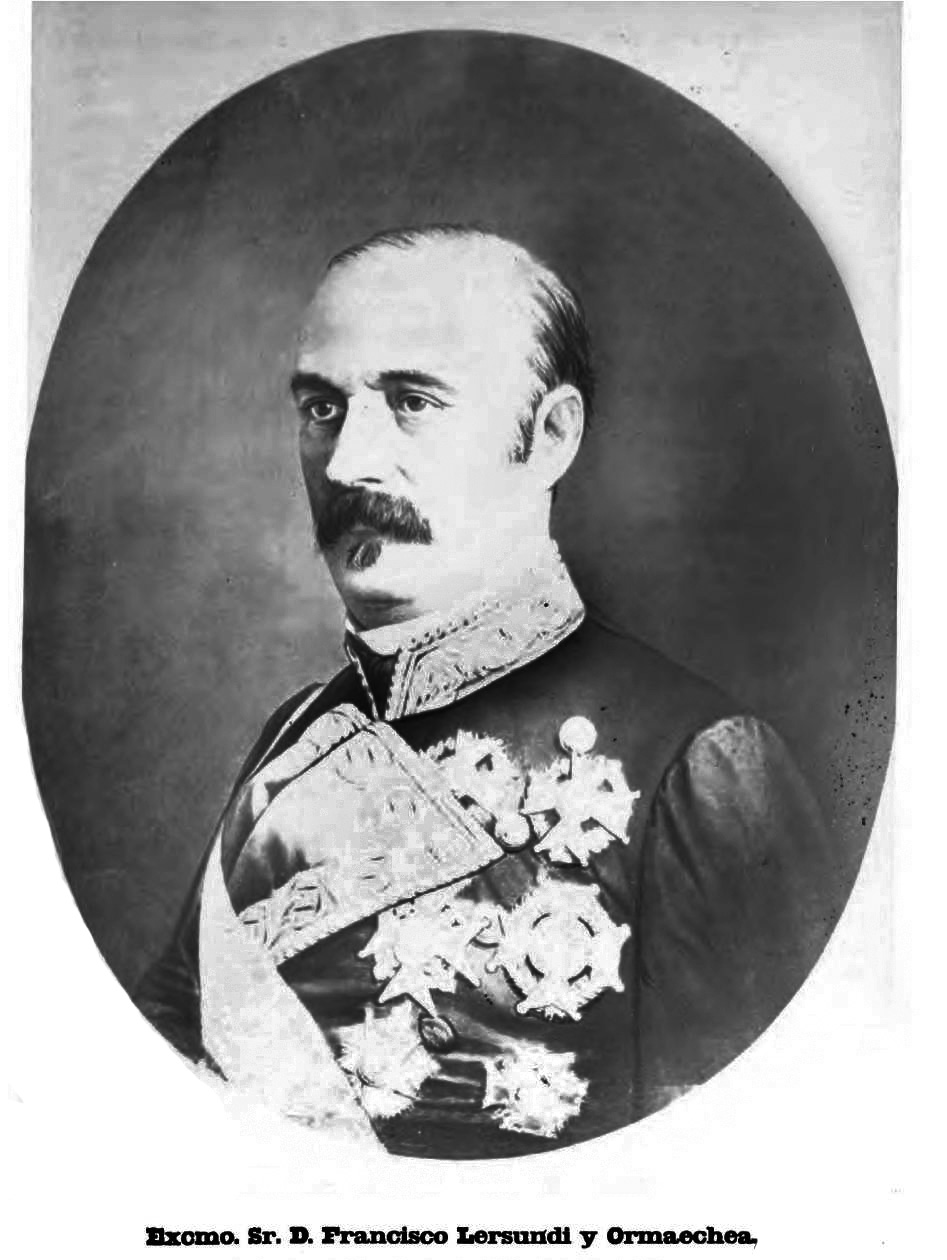

Prime Minister of Spain
- In office 14 April 1853 – 19 September 1853
- Monarch: Isabella II
- Preceded by: Federico Roncali
- Succeeded by: Luis José Sartorius

Minister of War of Spain
- In office 6 February 1851 – 16 January 1852
- Monarch: Isabella II
- Prime Minister: Juan Bravo Murillo
- Preceded by: Rafael Aristégui y Vélez
- Succeeded by: Joaquín Ezpeleta Enrile
- In office 14 April – 19 September 1853
- Monarch: Isabella II
- Prime Minister: Himself
- Preceded by: Juan de Lara
- Succeeded by: Anselmo Blaser
- In office 17 January – 1 March 1864
- Monarch: Isabella II
- Prime Minister: Lorenzo Arrazola
- Preceded by: José Gutiérrez de la Concha
- Succeeded by: José María Marchessi y Oleaga

Minister of the Navy of Spain
- In office 12 October – 15 October 1856
- Monarch: Isabella II
- Prime Minister: Ramón María Narváez
- Preceded by: Pedro Bayarri
- Succeeded by: José María de Bustillo Gómez de Barreda

Governor of Cuba
- In office 30 May – 3 November 1866
- Monarch: Isabella II
- Prime Minister: Leopoldo O'Donnell; Ramon María Narváez
- Minister of Overseas: Antonio Cánovas del Castillo; Alejandro de Castro y Casal
- Preceded by: Domingo Dulce
- Succeeded by: Joaquín del Manzano
- In office 21 December 1867 – 4 January 1869
- Monarch: Isabella II
- Regent: Francisco Serrano
- Prime Minister: Luis González Bravo; José Gutiérrez de la Concha; Francisco Serrano
- Minister of Overseas: Carlos Marfori y Callejas; Tomás Rodríguez Rubí; José Nacarino Bravo (as interim); Adelardo López de Ayala
- Preceded by: Blas Villate
- Succeeded by: Domingo Dulce

Personal details
- Born: Francisco de Lersundi y Ormaechea; 28 January 1817 Valencia, Spain
- Died: 17 November 1874 (aged 57) Bayonne, France

Francisco de Lersundi y Hormaechea (28 January 1817 in Valencia, Spain – 17 November 1874 in Bayonne, France) was a Spanish noble and politician who served as Prime Minister of Spain in 1853 and held other important offices such as Captain General of Cuba from 1866 to 1869. While he served as Prime Minister, he also simultaneously was the Minister of War.

He was appointed a senator for life in 1853.
