= Federico de Roncali, 1st Count of Alcoy =

Spanish noble, politician and military officer

The Most Excellent The Count of Alcoy

Prime Minister of Spain
- In office 14 December 1852 – 14 April 1853
- Monarch: Isabella II
- Preceded by: Juan Bravo Murillo
- Succeeded by: Luis José Sartorius

Personal details
- Born: Federico de Roncali Ceruti; 30 March 1800 Cadiz, Spain
- Died: 4 April 1857 (aged 57) Madrid, Spain

Don Federico de Roncali y Ceruti, 1st Count of Alcoy (30 March 1800, in Cádiz – 4 April 1857, in Madrid) was a Spanish noble, politician and military who served as Prime Minister of Spain between 1852 and 1853. He held other important offices such as Captain General of Cuba and Minister of State. He was also a senator for life in 1845.

Alcoy was the second son of Agustín de Roncali y Martínez de Murcia, Knight of Santiago, and his wife María del Carmen Ceruti y Feit. His eldest brother was Joaquín de Roncali, 1st Marquis of Roncali, also a prominent politician in the reign of Isabella II of Spain.

Political offices
Preceded by Juan Bravo Murillo	Prime Minister of Spain; 14 December 1852 – 14 April 1853	Succeeded by Francisco de Lersundi
Preceded by Manuel Bertrán de Lis	Minister of State; 14 December 1852 – 14 April 1853	Succeeded by Luis López de la Torre Ayllón
