= Luis José Sartorius, 1st Count of San Luis =

Spanish noble, politician and journalist

The Most Excellent The Count of San Luis
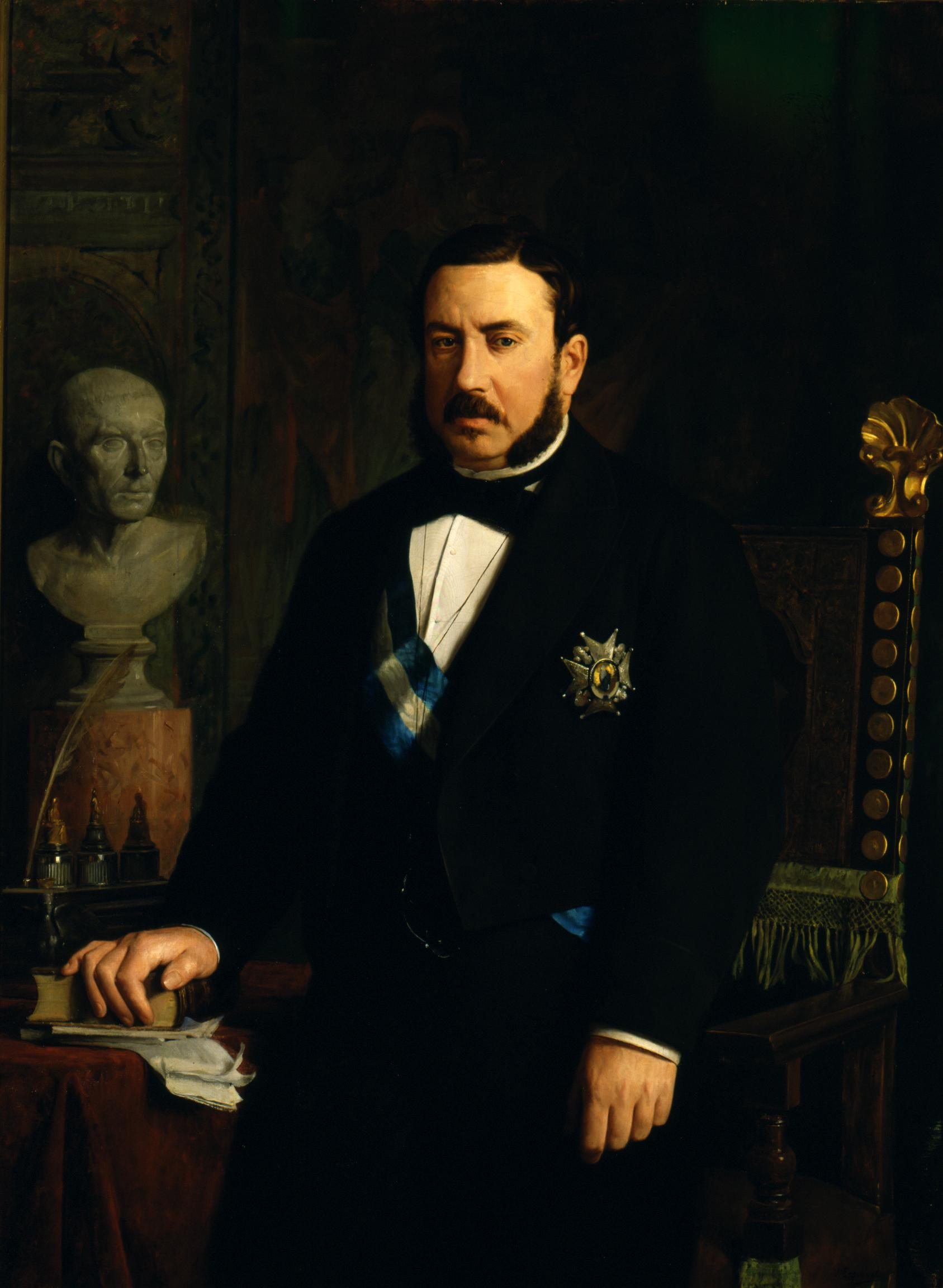
- Portrait, 1878

Prime Minister of Spain
- In office 19 September 1853 – 17 July 1854
- Monarch: Isabella II
- Preceded by: Francisco Lersundi
- Succeeded by: Fernando Fernandez de Cordova

Personal details
- Born: Luis José Sartorius y Tapia; 1 February 1820 Seville, Spain
- Died: 22 February 1871 (aged 51 years). Madrid, Spain

Don Luis José Sartorius y Tapia, 1st Count of San Luis (1 February 1820, in Seville, Spain – 22 February 1871, in Madrid, Spain) was a Spanish noble, politician and journalist who served as Prime Minister of Spain from 1853 to 1854, during the reign of Queen Isabella II.

Sartorius, a man of very traditional convictions, was the leader of a faction of the Moderate Party which, because of his erroneously supposed Polish origin, was known as los polacos ("the Poles"). His newspaper, El Herlado, became one of the mainstays of the moderates during the regency of the Progressivist Baldomero Espartero. During the Moderate decade (1844-1854), Sartorius held several political offices, especially three times as Ministry of the Interior (Ministro de Gobernacion) in 1847, 1849-1851 and 1853-1854. He became Prime Minister between 1853 and 1854.

== Family ==
Contrary to popular belief, Sartorius had nothing to do with Poland; he was of German origins. His paternal ancestors were from Hesse, the grandfather Johann Philipp Sartorius came from Umstadt and the grandmother María Isabel Trier was from Wehrda. Their son and Sartorius' father, Andrés Sartorius Trier, was born in Marburg; a military engaged against the French troops, he then sought refuge in Spain. He married María Joaquina Tapia Sánchez, born in Puerto Rico; her parents, Antonio de Tapia and Josefa Sánchez Oviedo, following a spell in America returned to their native Andalusia.

Sartorius was married to María de los Remedios Chacón y Romero de Cisneros (daughter of Rafael Chacón, 7th Marquis of Cela, and María del Amparo Romero de Cisneros y Nagüens), with whom he had seven children:

- Doña Isabel Sartorius y Chacón (b. 1874), died unmarried and without issue.
- Doña Laura Sartorius y Chacón, married to Enrique Maldonado y Carvajal, with issue.
- Doña Leonor Sartorius y Chacón, died as an infant.
- Don Luis Sartorius y Chacón, died as an infant.
- Don José Sartorius y Chacón, died as an infant.
- Doña María de la Concepción Sartorius y Chacón (1859-1887), married to Juan de Dios Pareja-Obregón, 7th Count of la Camorra, with issue.
- Don Fernando Sartorius, 2nd Count of San Luis (1860-1920), married to María del Carmen Díaz de Mendoza y Aguayo, with issue.

Political offices
Preceded by Francisco de Lersundi y Hormaechea	Prime Minister of Spain; 1853 - 1854	Succeeded by Fernando Fernández de Córdova
