= Gonzalo de Sandoval =

Spanish conquistador

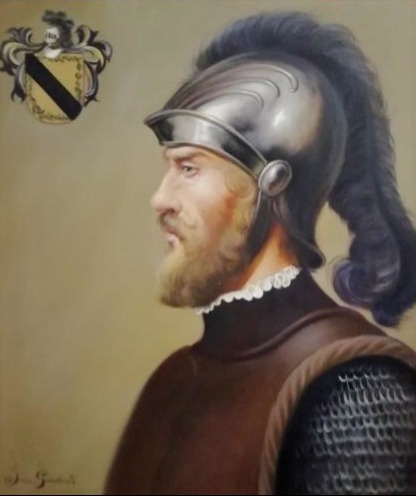
- Gonzalo de Sandoval in a modern rendition

Governor of New Spain
- In office 2 March 1527 – 22 August 1527 Serving with Alonso de Estrada and Luis de la Torre
- Preceded by: Marcos de Aguilar
- Succeeded by: Alonso de Estrada; Luis de la Torre

Personal details
- Born: 1497 Medellín, Castile
- Died: 1528 (aged 30–31) Niebla, Castile
- Resting place: La Rábida Friary
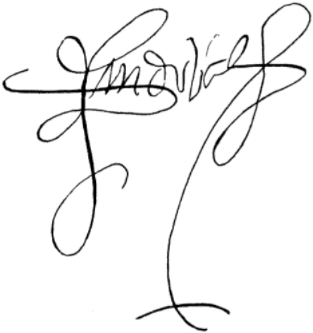
- Signature

Gonzalo de Sandoval (1497 – late 1528) was a Spanish conquistador in New Spain (Mexico) and briefly co-governor of the colony while Hernán Cortés was away from the capital (March 2, 1527 to August 22, 1527).

== Arrival in New Spain ==
Sandoval, who was born in Medellín, Spain, was the youngest of the lieutenants of Cortés. They arrived together in New Spain in 1519. After the subjugation of Moctezuma, Cortés placed him in command at Villa Rica de Vera Cruz as alguacil mayor. He seized the messengers of Pánfilo de Narváez, who demanded the surrender of the town, and sent them as prisoners to Cortés. In the ensuing battle, it was Sandoval who captured Narváez.

He led the vanguard in the Spanish retreat on the Noche Triste in 1520, and fought in the Battle of Otumba

He conducted operations against the Aztecs from a post called La Villa Segura de la Frontera, near Tepeaca. Afterwards, Gonzalo led attacks against the towns of Cacatami and Xalacingo. He stayed there until the brigantines were built for the attack by water on the capital, when he went to Tlaxcala to direct their transportation overland. During the Siege of Tenochtitlan, he led attacks on the Mexican garrisons in Chalco and Tlalmanalco, and escorted the timber needed for the sloops, to Texcoco. Gonzalo also led three battles around Huaxtepec in March 1521. In April, he guarded the launches in Texcoco, as Cortes advanced to Chimaluacan, where he gathered twenty thousand native allies before marching as far as Azcapotzalco and then returning to Gonzalo in Texcoco. Gonzalo commanded one of four forces under Cortes. Sandoval was wounded twice during one of the battles on the causeways. Sandoval was sent by Cortes to counter a threat by Cuauhtémoc's allies in the Spanish rear, returning with two captured Matlazingo chieftains as prisoner.

== Siege of Tenochtitlan ==
Along the way he was ordered to conquer a town the Spanish had named poblado morisco (Moorish town) in Calpulalpa or Sultepec. The population fled at the approach of the Spanish. Sandoval found some horse hides hung in a temple. (The Indians had no horses.) In another temple he found the inscription: "Here was imprisoned the hapless Juan Yuste, with many others I brought in my company." Yuste was one of the soldiers who had arrived with Narváez. Sandoval destroyed the town, and then returned to his task of transporting the vessels for the attack on Tenochtitlan.

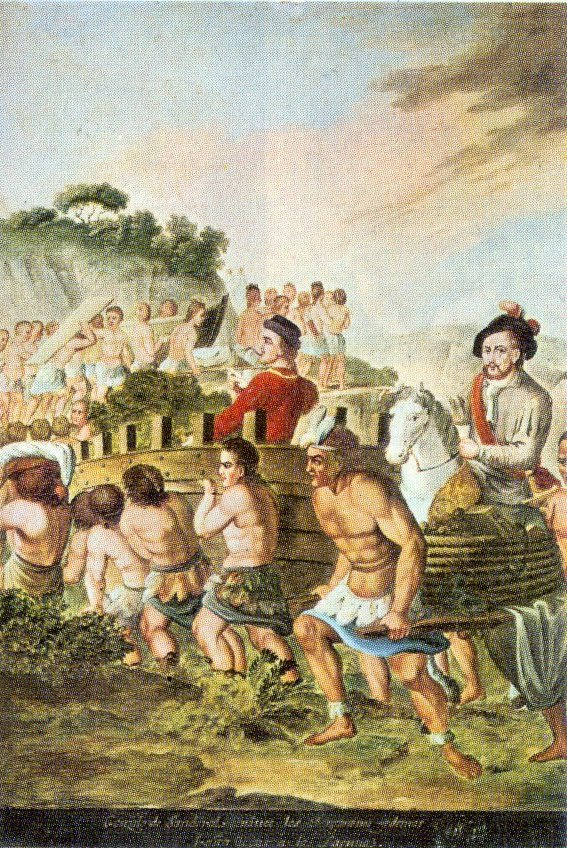
Gonzalo de Sandoval supervising the transport of the brigantines

In the siege he occupied the eastern approach. His company, and Cortes', was eventually able to join Pedro de Alvarado's company in the Tlatelolco marketplace.

One of the men under his command, García Holguín, in command of one of the brigantines in the assault on Tenochtitlan, captured the Tlatoani Cuauhtémoc. Holguín and Sandoval took him to Cortés.

== After the fall of Tenochtitlan ==
In December 1521, Sandoval met Cristóbal de Tapia, who had been sent by the Crown to relieve Cortes, and in a council of officers obtained a delay.

He became the godfather of one of the nobles of Tlaxcala, Citlalpopocatzin, who took the baptismal name of Bartolomé.

Later he was sent to the region of Coatzacoalcos, where he pacified Huatusco, Tuxtepec and Oaxaca. He also founded the town of Medellín in Tatatetelco, near Huatusco and south of present-day Veracruz; completed the pacification of Coatzacoalcos; founded the port of Espíritu Santo along the Coatzacoalcos River; took the best village (Guaspaltepeque) for his own; and consolidated the subjugation of Centla, Chinantla and Tabasco. In Pánuco, he repressed an indigenous insurrection.

== Founding of Colima ==
After Juan Rodríguez de Villafuerte was defeated by the Indigenous in the Valley of Tecomán (in the present-day state of Colima) in 1522, Cortés sent Gonzalo de Sandoval there with instructions to conquer the territory and found a town. In the indigenous town of Caxitlán, near the coast, Sandoval founded the city of Colima in its first location on July 25, 1523. He also established its city government, the third oldest in New Spain. Later, in 1527, Francisco Cortés de San Buenaventura moved the city to its present location and gave it the name of San Sebastián de Colima.

== Honduras ==
He was with Cortés in Honduras in 1524, where he was made alguacil and granted some encomiendas, such as Xacona. On his return from this expedition, he was made justicia mayor of New Spain. He replaced Marcos de Aguilar in the governing council of the colony on March 2, 1527, and served in the government until August 22, 1527.

== Return to Spain ==
In the fall of 1527, he traveled with Cortés to Spain, arriving at the port of Niebla in December after a voyage of only 41 days. Sandoval had already fallen seriously ill on the journey and died at Palos after his arrival. (Previously 13 bars of gold had been stolen from him.) He was buried in the iglesia de San Martín Niebla.

== Evaluation ==
Bernal Díaz del Castillo, his friend and battle companion, wrote that he was a good judge and administrator, besides being a good soldier.

Díaz del Castillo also said this about him:

He was not highly educated, but a simple man; neither was he covetous for gold, but only for fame and to be a good, strong captain. In the wars of New Spain he always took account of the soldiers... and befriended them and helped them. He was not a man who wore rich clothes, but very plain ones.

== See also ==
- Pedro de Alvarado
- Cristobal de Olid

== Bibliography ==
- Díaz del Castillo, B. (1998). Plaza Janés, España (ed.). Historia verdadera de la conquista de Nueva España (in Spanish). (479 pp.)
- Martínez, J. L. (1991). Hernán Cortés (in Spanish). Mexico City: Fondo de Cultura Económica-UNAM. (1009 pp.)
- Prescott, W. H. The Conquest of Mexico.
- Thomas, H. (2000). Who's Who of the Conquistadors. Cassell & Co. (444 pp.)
