= Luis Ponce de León (governor of New Spain) =

Governor of New Spain

Governor of New Spain
- In office 4 July 1526 – 16 July 1526
- Preceded by: Hernán Cortés
- Succeeded by: Marcos de Aguilar

Personal details
- Died: 20 July 1526 Mexico City
- Occupation: Judge, bureaucrat

Luis Ponce de León (c. 1461 - July 20, 1526) was a Spanish judge and briefly the governor of New Spain, from July 4, 1526, to July 16, 1526.

== Biography ==
Luis Ponce de León was an educated man and a knight of Cordoba. He was a friend and aide of the corregidor of Toledo, Martín de Córdoba, conde de Alcaudete.

Ponce's appointment came in 1525 after news about serious difficulties in New Spain began reaching the court of Charles I of Spain and the Council of the Indies. In 1524 Hernán Cortés had learned of the rebellion of Cristóbal de Olid in Honduras and abandoned his governorship of New Spain to treasury officials to head to Honduras. During his absence the governorship was chaotically shared among rival pro-Cortés and anti-Cortés factions in the treasury. Eventually rumors arrived in Mexico City and in Spain that Cortés had died along the way to Honduras. King Charles I ordered a juicio de residencia (a commission of inquiry) to investigate Cortés and ascertain the true situation in the colony, and the state of the interim government.

To carry out these orders, Charles named Luis Ponce de León as judge of the residencia and governor of New Spain, at an annual salary of 3,000 ducats of gold. Ponce de León sailed from Sanlúcar de Barrameda on February 2, 1526. In May, Cortés returned to Mexico City and resumed his governorship. Ponce was detained in Hispaniola until May 31, 1526, for repairs to his ship, arriving in Mexico City in June, He presented himself to the ayuntamiento (city government) on July 5, 1526. He carried with him the decree from Toledo dated November 4, 1525 granting him the powers, and Cortés stepped aside to honor the royal decree.

Ponce de León left all the officials of the ayuntamiento in their positions. He was about 65 years old and ill with fever contracted on his arrival in Veracruz. The fever had continued through the 12-day journey to the capital and did not let up even after his arrival there. After taking office, he retired from public occupations and soon died. Before his death he turned over his functions to Marcos de Aguilar, his assistant who had accompanied him to the colony. Aguilar also had a royal appointment. He took over the government on July 16, 1526.

Four days later Ponce de León died. He was interred in the first parish church in Mexico City, facing the Plaza Mayor. Aguilar, also aged, died just over seven months later. Cortés was suspected of poisoning the two royal officials.
