= Cristóbal de Tapia =

2nd Governor of New Spain

2nd Governor of New Spain
- In office 24 December 1521 – 30 December 1521
- Preceded by: Hernán Cortés
- Succeeded by: Hernán Cortés

Cristóbal de Tapia was an inspector sent to New Spain in 1521 to investigate the conduct of the conquistador Hernán Cortés, and if he deemed it necessary, to arrest him and bring him to trial. Because his authority derived from the king and superseded that of Cortés, his name appears on some lists of Spanish colonial rulers of New Spain, although he exercised this authority very briefly.

== Biography ==
In 1521 the bishop of Burgos, Juan Rodríguez de Fonseca, was president of the Council of the Indies, the body exercising direct royal control over the overseas empire of Spain. He was the dominant voice on the Council, and he was no friend of Cortés. In the spring of 1521, the Council passed a series of ordinances intended to rein in Cortés and strengthen the crown's control over the lands he had conquered. These ordinances directed that Pánfilo de Narváez, held a prisoner in Veracruz by Cortés, should be released, and that an inspector should be sent to New Spain to investigate the conduct of the conqueror, and to render justice to the governor of Cuba, Diego Velázquez de Cuéllar, whose orders Cortés had refused to obey.

At this time Emperor Charles V was attending to affairs in Germany. Spain was being governed by a regency headed by Adrian of Utrecht (later Pope Adrian VI). The ordinances were signed by Adrian at Burgos on April 11, 1521 and countersigned by Bishop Fonseca.

As William H. Prescott narrates:

The individual selected for the delicate task of apprehending Cortes, and bringing him to trial, on the theatre of his own discoveries and in the heart of his own camp, was named Christoval de Tapia, veedor, or inspector of the gold foundries in St. Domingo. He was a feeble, vacillating man, as little competent to cope with Cortes's in civil matters, as Narvaez had shown himself to be in military.

Tapia arrived from Santo Domingo with two ships in December 1521. On December 24, 1521, he presented his papers to officers of Cortés in Veracruz, including Cristóbal de Olid and Gonzalo de Sandoval. He started for Mexico City to speak directly to Cortés, but made it only as far as Cempoal. Here there was a conference, and Tapia realized that the conquistadors would not recognize his authority. On December 30, 1521, Sandoval persuaded him to relinquish the authority and return to Santo Domingo.

Prescott again:

The commissioner, clothed in his brief authority, landed in December, at Villa Rica. But he was coldly received by the magistrates of the city. His credentials were disputed, on the ground of some technical informality. It was objected, moreover, that his commission was founded on obvious misrepresentations to the government; and, notwithstanding a most courteous and complimentary epistle which he received from Cortes, congratulating him, as old friend, on his arrival, the veedor soon found that he was neither to be permitted to penetrate far into the country, nor to exercise any control there. He loved money, and, as Cortes knew the weak side of his "old friend," he proposed to purchase his horses, slaves, and equipage, at a tempting price. The dreams of disappointed ambition were gradually succeeded by those of avarice; and the discomfited commissioner consented to re-embark for Cuba, well freighted with gold if not with glory.
