= Marcos de Aguilar =

Governor of New Spain

Governor of New Spain
- In office 16 July 1526 – 1 March 1527
- Preceded by: Luis Ponce de León
- Succeeded by: Alonso de Estrada; Gonzalo de Sandoval; Luis de la Torre

Personal details
- Born: Seville, Castile
- Died: 1 March 1527 Mexico City
- Occupation: Bureaucrat

Marcos de Aguilar (died March 1, 1527) was briefly royal governor of New Spain (from July 16, 1526 to March 1, 1527).

== Biography ==
Marcos de Aguilar was born in Seville, Spain, and was a licenciado. He served in various judicial capacities in Seville. Before his arrival in New Spain, he had been Inquisitor of the Indies and alcalde mayor of Santo Domingo, with his residence on the island of Hispaniola.

Marcos arrived Hispaniola with Diego Colon in 1509.

In 1525 or 1526 news of the rivalry between Alonso de Estrada and Gonzalo de Salazar in the government of New Spain reached Madrid, as did rumors of the death of Hernán Cortés at the hands of the Indigenous. (Cortés had not been killed. He was absent from the capital on an expedition to Honduras, but word had not been heard from him for some time.) King Charles I (Emperor Charles V) ordered a juicio de residencia (a commission of inquiry) to investigate Cortés and ascertain the true situation in the colony, and the state of the interim government.

To carry out these orders, Charles named Luis Ponce de León as judge of the residencia and governor of New Spain. Ponce de León sailed from Sanlúcar de Barrameda on February 2, 1526. Ponce de León was delayed in Hispaniola until May 31, 1526 for repairs to his ship. When he sailed again, he was accompanied by Licenciado Marcos de Aguilar. Aguilar was sent as visitador (inspector), specifically charged with investigating the religious topics that might come up in Cortés's residencia.

Ponce de León arrived in Mexico City and presented himself to the ayuntamiento (city government) on July 5, 1526. He carried with him a decree from Toledo dated November 4, 1525 granting him the extraordinary powers.

Marcos de Aguilar left all the officials of the ayuntamiento in their positions. He was about 65 years old and ill with fever contracted on his arrival in Veracruz. The fever did not let up even after his arrival in the capital. After taking office, he retired from public occupations and then died. Before his death he turned over his functions to Aguilar. Aguilar took over the government on July 16, 1526. Also on that date, Diego Hernández de Proaño became alguicil general (general bailiff), named by the king.

Four days later Ponce de León died.

The day after his appointment, Aguilar named Gerónimo de Medina his associate in the government of the colony. The cabildo (city council) of Mexico City, composed of partisans of Cortés, at first rejected his authority. However, Aguilar was a man of energy and ability, and soon imposed his authority. Cortés himself disdained to recognize him. On December 1, 1526 Cortés, as captain-general of New Spain, announced some decrees that caused public friction between the two.

On January 7, 1527, Antonio Cordero became alguicil de campo (bailiff of the countryside), named by Aguilar. The alguicil general had a voice and a vote in the municipal councils that governed the capital and other towns. The alguicil de campo represented the farmers and ranchers outside of the cities.

Like his predecessor, Aguilar died in Mexico City after governing only a short while (7½ months). Cortés was suspected of poisoning both royal officials. Shortly before his death, he named Treasurer Alonso de Estrada as his successor.

== See also ==
- List of Viceroys of New Spain
