= Hernán Cortés =

Spanish conquistador and explorer (1485–1547)

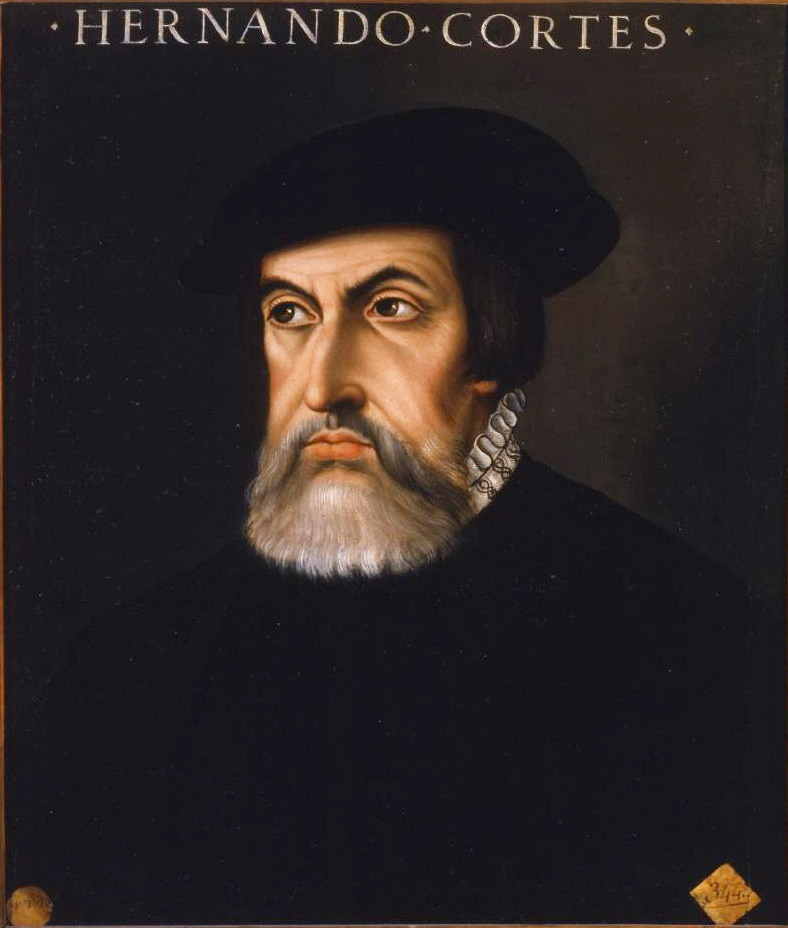
- 18th-century portrait of Cortés based on the one sent by the conqueror to Paolo Giovio, which has served as a model for many of his representations since the 16th century

1st Governor of New Spain
- In office 25 June 1526 – 3 July 1526
- Preceded by: Alonso de Estrada; Rodrigo de Albornoz
- Succeeded by: Luis Ponce de León
- In office 30 December 1521 – 12 October 1524
- Preceded by: Cristóbal de Tapia
- Succeeded by: Triumvirate: Alonso de Estrada; Rodrigo de Albornoz; Alonso de Zuazo
- In office 13 August 1521 – 24 December 1521
- Monarch: Charles I of Spain
- Preceded by: Office established
- Succeeded by: Cristóbal de Tapia

Personal details
- Born: Hernando Cortés; 1485 Medellín, Castile
- Died: 2 December 1547 (aged 61–62) Castilleja de la Cuesta, Spain
- Cause of death: Dysentery and Pleurisy
- Resting place: Hospital de Jesús Nazareno; Mexico City, Mexico
- Spouses: Catalina Suárez (m. 1516; died 1522) Juana de Zúñiga (m. 1529)
- Domestic partner(s): La Malinche; Isabel Moctezuma
- Children: Don Martín Cortés, 2nd Marquess of the Valley of Oaxaca; Doña María Cortés; Doña Catalina Cortés; Doña Juana Cortės; Martín Cortés; Leonor Cortés Moctezuma
- Occupation: Conquistador
- Known for: Spanish conquest of the Aztec Empire, Spanish conquest of Honduras

Military service
- Battles/wars: Conflicts: Spanish conquest of the Aztec Empire; Battle of Cempoala; La Noche Triste (WIA); Battle of Otumba; Fall of Tenochtitlan; Spanish conquest of Honduras

Hernán Cortés, 1st Marquis of the Valley of Oaxaca (Note: /(h)ɛərˈnɑːn kɔːrˈtɛs/, /-ˈtɛz/ (h)air-NAHN kor-TESS, -TEZ; Spanish: [eɾˈnan koɾˈtes ðe monˈroj i piˈθaro altamiˈɾano]) (c. 1485 – 2 December 1547) was a Spanish conquistador, military commander, explorer, captain general, and writer, best known for his expedition that led to the Spanish conquest of the Aztec Empire and brought large portions of what is now mainland Mexico under the rule of the King of Castile in the early 16th century. Cortés had been part of the generation of Spanish explorers and conquistadors who began the first phase of the Spanish colonization of the Americas (the broader European colonization of the Americas).

Born in Medellín, Spain, to a poor family of nobility, Cortés chose to pursue adventure and riches into the New World. He went to Hispaniola and later to Cuba, where he received an encomienda (the right to the labour of certain subjects). For a short time, he served as alcalde (magistrate) of the second Spanish town founded on the island. In 1519, he was elected captain of the third expedition to the mainland, which he partly funded. His enmity with the governor of Cuba, Diego Velázquez de Cuéllar, resulted in the recall of the expedition at the last moment, an order which Cortés ignored.

Arriving on the continent, Cortés executed a successful strategy of allying with some American Indians against others, using the divide and conquer tactic. He also used Amerindian woman, Doña Marina, as his personal interpreter. She later gave birth to his first son. When the governor of Cuba sent emissaries to arrest Cortés, he fought them and won, using the extra troops as reinforcements. Cortés wrote letters directly to the king asking to be acknowledged for his successes instead of being punished for mutiny. After he overthrew the powerful Mesoamerican Aztec Empire, Cortés was awarded the title of marqués del Valle de Oaxaca, while the more prestigious title of viceroy was given to a high-ranking nobleman, Antonio de Mendoza. In 1541, Cortés returned back to Spain, where he had died six years later of dysentery and pleurisy.

== Name ==
In his known writings, Cortés always referred to himself as Hernando Cortés. Until the 20th century, most writers continued to spell his first name as "Hernando" or the equivalent, "Fernando". William H. Prescott's Conquest of Mexico (1843), for instance, referred to him as Hernando Cortés. However, in the 20th century, the conventional spelling has gradually shifted to the shortened form, "Hernán". Most modern biographies and encyclopedias now refer to him as "Hernán".

== Physical appearance ==
In addition to the illustration by the German artist Christoph Weiditz in his Trachtenbuch, there are three known portraits of Hernán Cortés which were likely made during his lifetime, though only copies of them have survived. All of these portraits show Cortés in the later years of his life. The account of the conquest of the Aztec Empire written by Bernal Díaz del Castillo, gives a detailed description of Hernán Cortés's physical appearance:

He was of good stature and body, well proportioned and stocky, the color of his face was somewhat grey, not very cheerful, and a longer face would have suited him more. His eyes seemed at times loving and at times grave and serious. His beard was black and sparse, as was his hair, which at the time he sported in the same way as his beard. He had a high chest, a well shaped back and was lean with little belly.

— Bernal Díaz del Castillo

== Early life ==
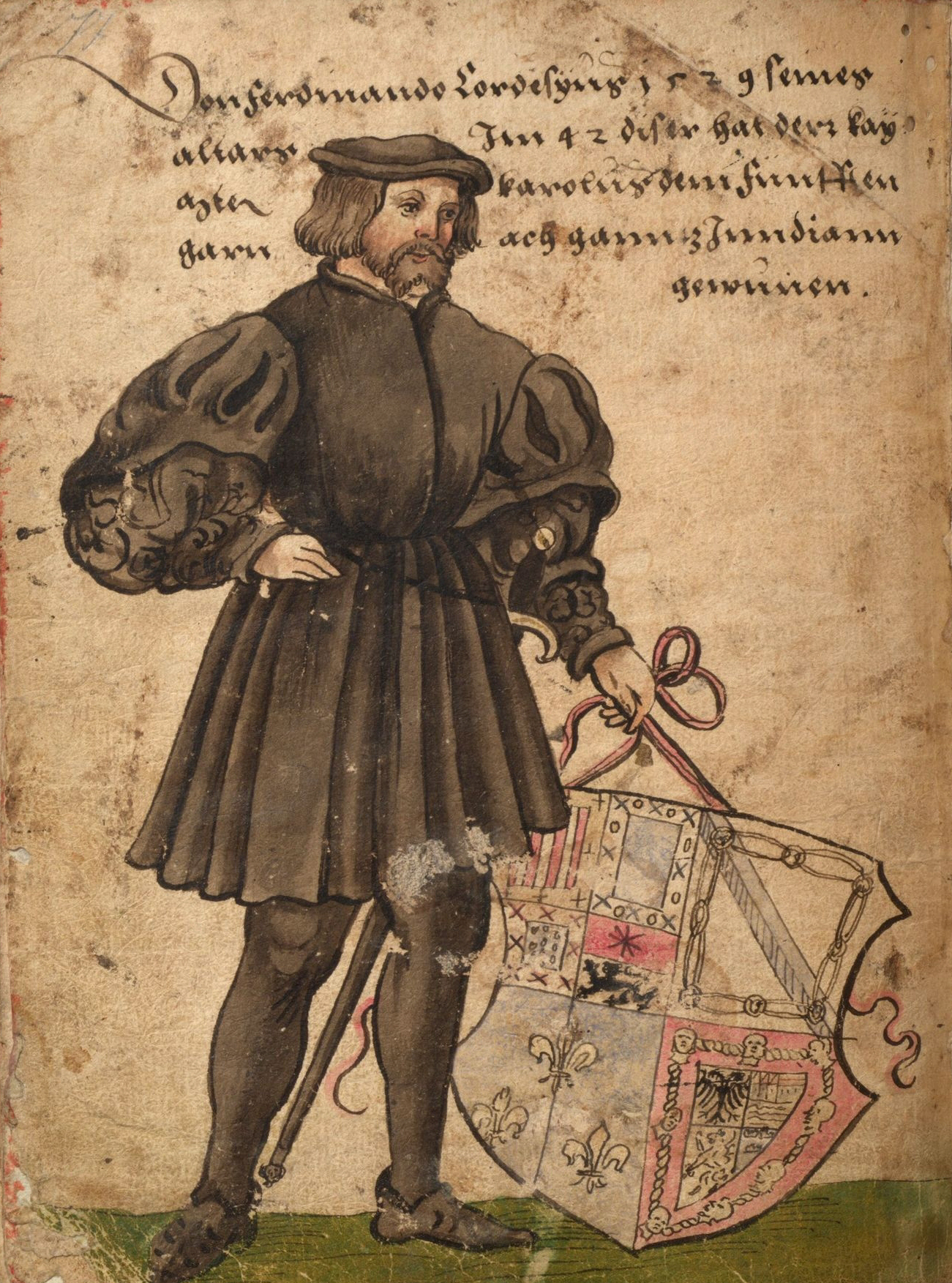
Weiditz's depiction of Cortés in 1529

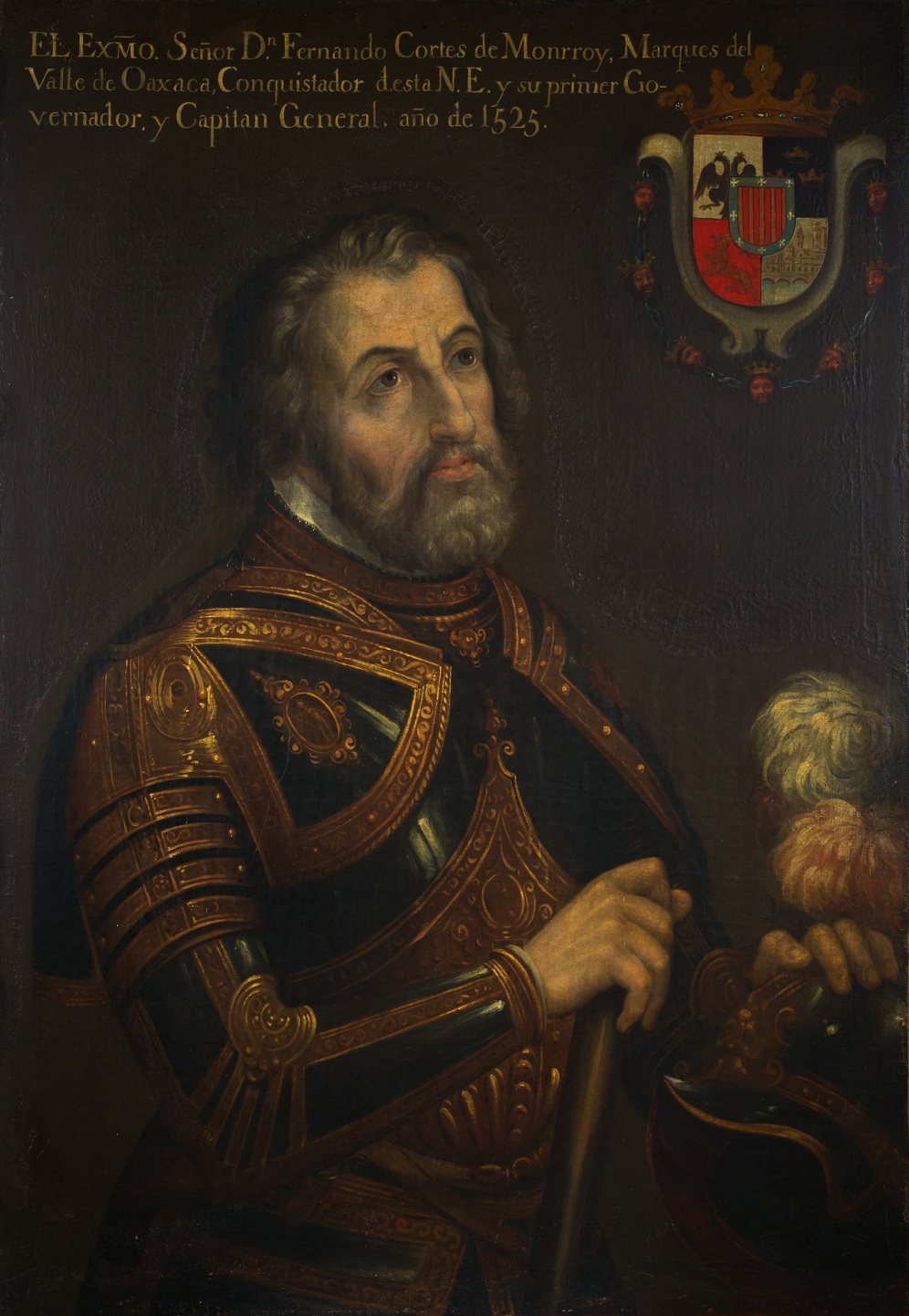
Copy of a portrait of Cortés dated to the year 1525

Cortés was born around 1485 in the town of Medellín, Extremadura, a poor and desolate province of the Kingdom of Castile. His father was Martín Cortés an hidalgo of distinguished ancestry but slender means. Bartolomé de las Casas, who knew Cortés's father, wrote that he was "a very poor and humble squire, although an Old Christian and they say a nobleman". His mother was Catalína Pizarro. Through her mother, Leonor Sanchez Pizarro, Hernán was a distant relation to Francisco Pizarro, the conqueror of the Inca Empire.

According to his biographer and chaplain, Francisco López de Gómara, Cortés was pale and sickly as a child. At the age of 14, he was sent to study Latin under an uncle in Salamanca. Later historians have misconstrued this personal tutoring as time spent enrolled at the University of Salamanca.

After two years, Cortés returned home to Medellín, much to the irritation of his parents, who had hoped to see him equipped for a profitable legal career. However, those two years in Salamanca, plus his long period of training and experience as a notary, first in Valladolid and later in Hispaniola, helped give him knowledge of the legal codes of Castile that he applied to help justify his unauthorized conquest of Mexico.

At this point in his life, Cortés was described by Gómara as ruthless, haughty, and mischievous. The 16-year-old youth had returned home to feel constrained by life in his small provincial town. By this time, news of the exciting discoveries of Christopher Columbus and his voyages from 1492 to 1504 in the New World was trending back in Spain.

== Early career in the New World ==
Plans were made for Cortés to sail to the Americas with a family acquaintance and distant relative, Nicolás de Ovando, the newly appointed Governor of Hispaniola. (This island is now divided between Haiti and the Dominican Republic). Cortés suffered an injury and was prevented from travelling. He spent the next year wandering the country, probably spending most of his time in Spain's southern ports of Cádiz, Palos, Sanlucar, and Seville. He finally left for Hispaniola in 1504 and became a colonist.

=== Arrival ===
Cortés reached Hispaniola in a ship commanded by Alonso Quintero, who tried to deceive his superiors and reach the New World before them in order to secure personal advantages. Quintero's mutinous conduct may have served as a model for Cortés in his subsequent career.

Upon his arrival in 1504 in Santo Domingo, the capital of Hispaniola, the 18-year-old Cortés registered as a citizen; this entitled him to a building plot and land to farm. Soon afterwards, Governor Nicolás de Ovando granted him an encomienda and appointed him as a notary of the town of Azua de Compostela. His next five years seemed to help establish him in the colony; in 1506, Cortés took part in the conquests of Hispaniola and Cuba. The expedition leader awarded him a large estate of land and Taíno slaves for his efforts.

=== Cuba (1511–1519) ===
In 1511, Cortés accompanied Diego Velázquez de Cuéllar, an aide of the Governor of Hispaniola, in his expedition to conquer Cuba. Afterwards, Velázquez was appointed Governor of Cuba. At the age of 26, Cortés was made clerk to the treasurer with the responsibility of ensuring that the Crown received the quinto, or customary one-fifth of the profits from the expedition.

Velázquez was so impressed with Cortés that he secured a high political position for him in the colony. He became secretary for Governor Velázquez. Cortés was twice appointed municipal magistrate (alcalde) of Santiago. In Cuba, Cortés became a man of substance with an encomienda to provide Indian labour for his mines and cattle. This new position of power also made him the new source of leadership, which opposing forces in the colony could then turn to. In 1514, Cortés led a group which demanded that more Indians be assigned to the European settlers.

As time went on, relations between Cortés and Governor Velázquez became strained. Cortés found time to become romantically involved with Catalina Xuárez (or Juárez), the sister-in-law of Governor Velázquez. Part of Velázquez's displeasure seems to have been based on a belief that Cortés was trifling with Catalina's affections. Cortés was temporarily distracted by one of Catalina's sisters, but finally married Catalina, reluctantly, under pressure from Governor Velázquez. However, by doing so, he hoped to secure the goodwill of both her family and that of Velázquez.

It was not until he had been almost 15 years in the Indies that Cortés began to look beyond his substantial status as mayor of the capital of Cuba and as a man of affairs in the thriving colony. He missed the first two expeditions, under the orders of Francisco Hernández de Córdoba and then Juan de Grijalva, sent by Diego Velázquez to Mexico in 1518. News reached Velázquez that Grijalva had established a colony on the mainland where there was a bonanza of silver and gold, and Velázquez decided to send him help. Cortés was appointed captain general of this new expedition in October 1518, but was advised to move fast before Velázquez changed his mind.

With Cortés's experience as an administrator, knowledge gained from many failed expeditions, and his impeccable rhetoric, he was able to gather six ships and 300 men within a month. Velázquez's jealousy exploded and he decided to put the expedition in other hands. However, Cortés quickly gathered more men and ships in other Cuban ports.

== Conquest of the Aztec Empire (1519–1521) ==
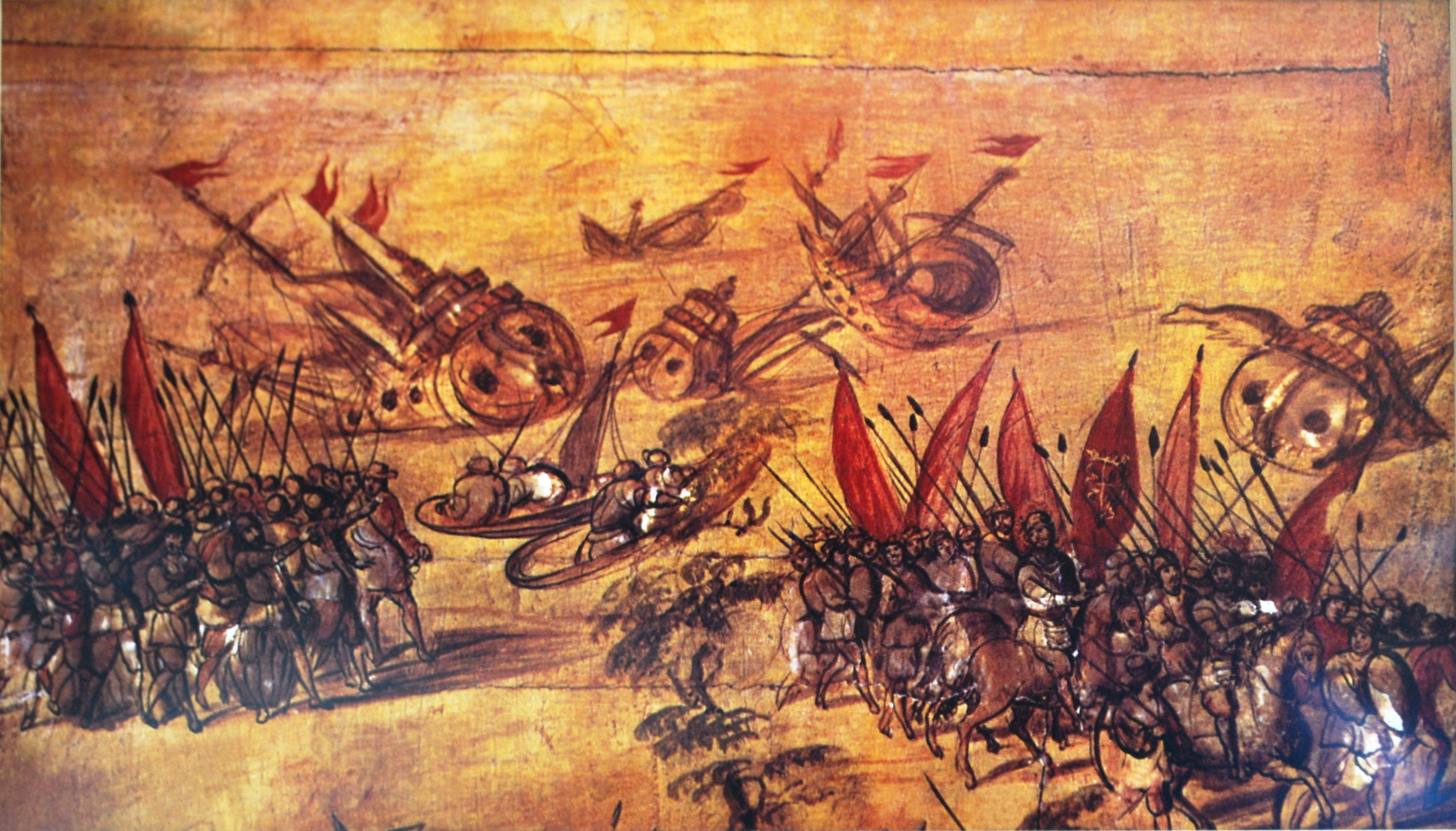
Cortés scuttling his own fleet off the coast of Veracruz in order to eliminate the possibility of retreat

In 1518, Velázquez put Cortés in command of an expedition to explore and secure the interior of Mexico for colonization. At the last minute, due to the old argument between the two, Velázquez changed his mind and revoked Cortés's charter. Cortés ignored the orders and, in an act of open mutiny, went anyway in February 1519. He stopped in Trinidad, Cuba, to hire more soldiers and obtain more horses. Accompanied by about 11 ships, 500 men (including "seasoned" slaves -- i.e. enslaved people who had, on Hispaniola, become "accustomed to the climate, foods, and diseases of post-1492 America, where the 'weakest' among them died off"), 13 horses, and a small number of cannon, Cortés landed on the Yucatán Peninsula in Maya territory. There he encountered Geronimo de Aguilar, a Spanish Franciscan priest who had survived a shipwreck followed by a period in captivity with the Maya, before escaping. Aguilar had learned the Chontal Maya language and was able to translate for Cortés.

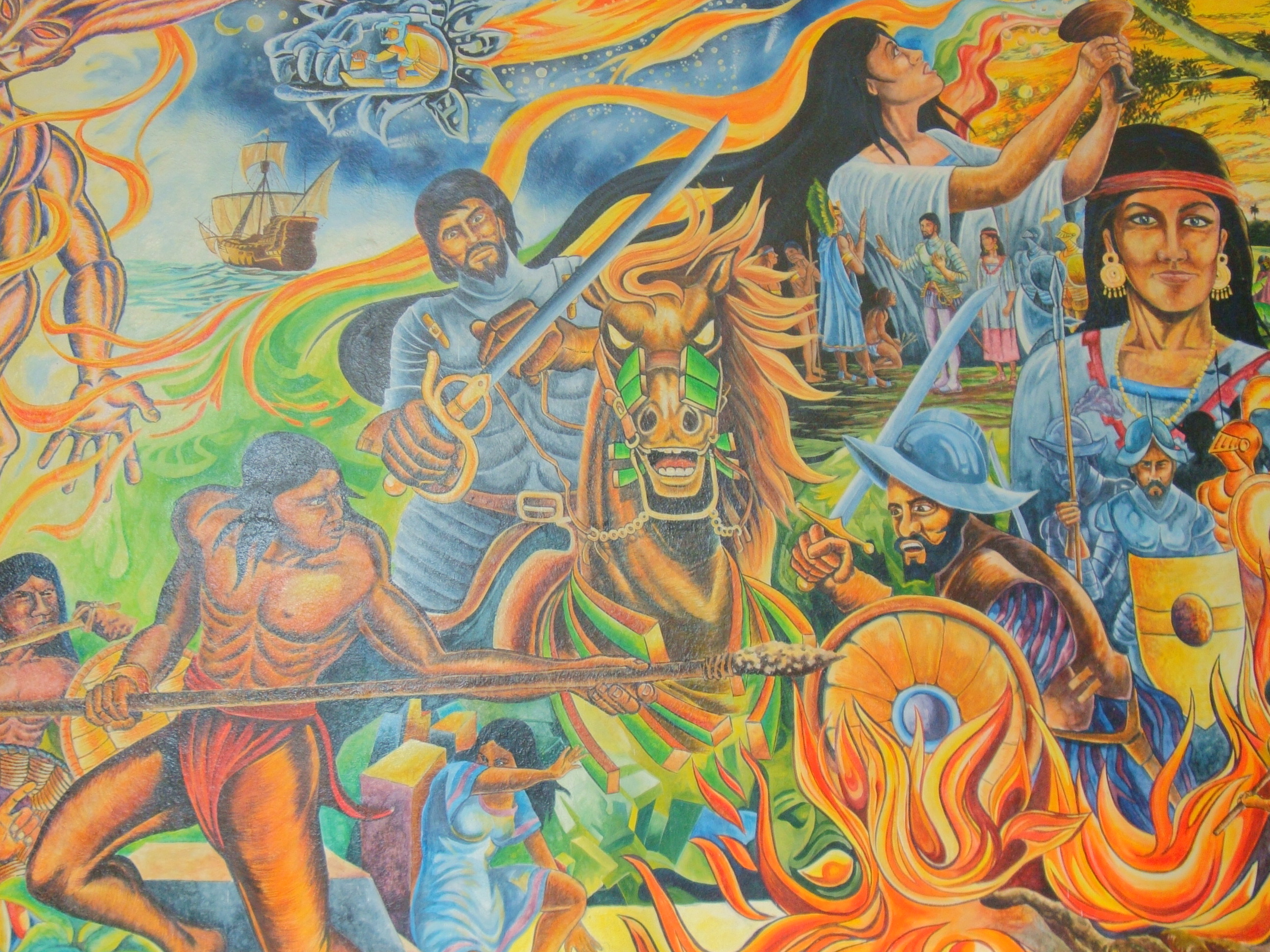
The Battle of Centla, where horses played a decisive role in one of the first military engagements in the Americas. Mural located in the municipal palace of Paraíso, Tabasco, Mexico.

Cortés's military experience was almost nonexistent, but he proved to be an effective leader of his small army and won early victories over the coastal Indians. In March 1519, Cortés formally claimed the land for the Spanish crown. Then he proceeded to Tabasco, where he initially was met with resistance, but had eventually won a battle against the American Indians. He received twenty young Amerindian women from the vanquished American Indians, and he converted them all to Christianity.

A map depicting Cortés's invasion route from the coast to the Aztec capital of Tenochtitlan

Among these women was La Malinche, his future mistress and the mother of his son Martín. Malinche knew both the Nahuatl language and Chontal Maya, thus enabling Cortés to communicate with the Aztecs through Aguilar. At San Juan de Ulúa on Easter Sunday 1519, Cortés met with Moctezuma II's Aztec Empire governors Tendile and Pitalpitoque.

In July 1519, his men took over Veracruz. By this act, Cortés dismissed the authority of the governor of Cuba to place himself directly under the orders of King Charles. To eliminate any ideas of retreat, Cortés scuttled his ships.

=== March on Tenochtitlán ===
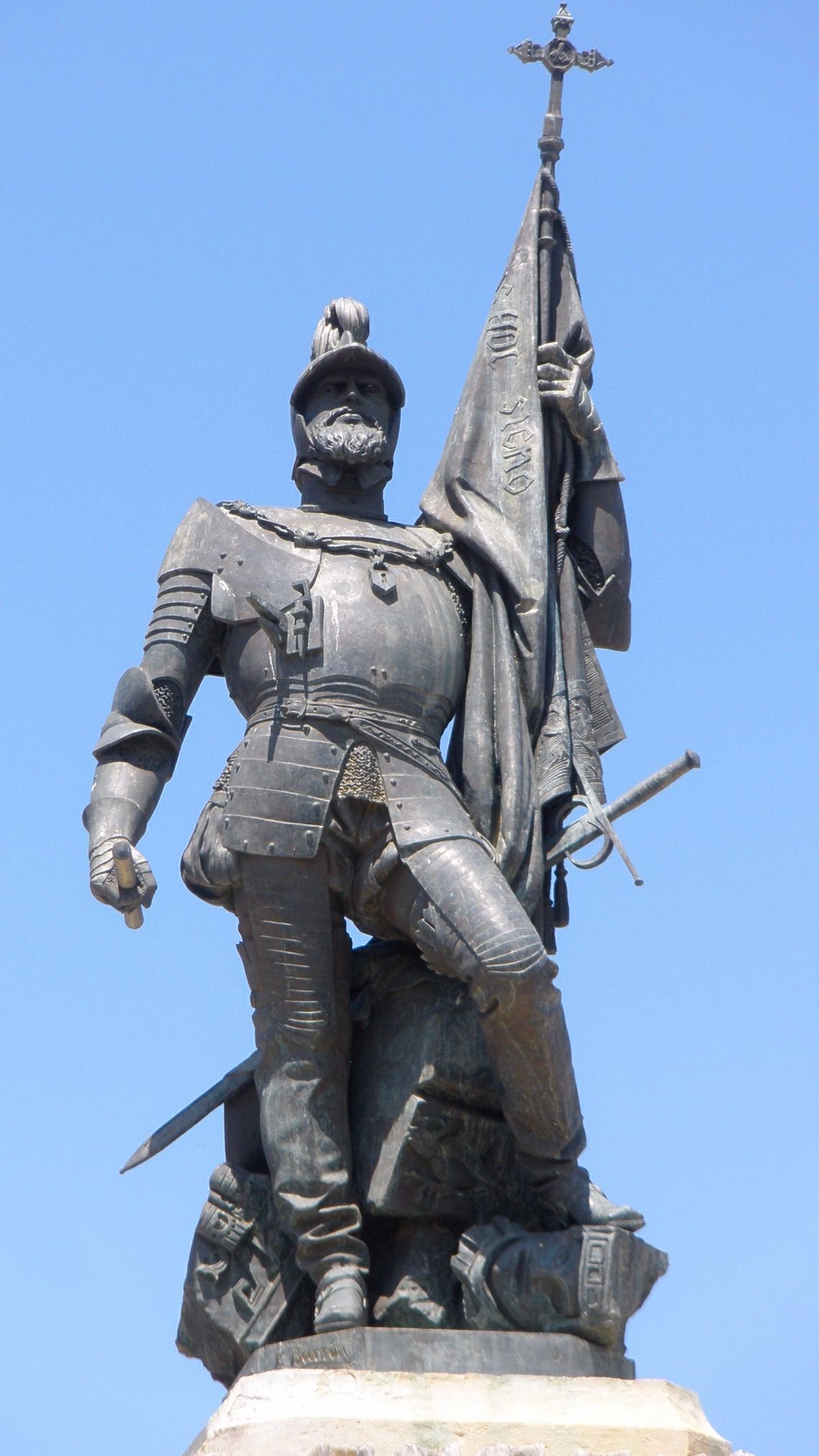
Monument to Hernán Cortés in his hometown of Medellín, Spain

In Veracruz, he met some of the tributaries of the Aztecs and asked them to arrange a meeting with Moctezuma II, the tlatoani (ruler) of the Aztec Empire. Moctezuma repeatedly turned down the meeting, but Cortés was determined. Leaving a hundred men in Veracruz, Cortés marched on Tenochtitlán in mid-August 1519, along with 600 soldiers, 15 horsemen, 15 cannons, and hundreds of indigenous carriers and warriors.

On the way to Tenochtitlán, Cortés made strong alliances with American Indians such as the Totonacs of Cempoala and the Nahuas of Tlaxcala. The Otomis and then the Tlaxcalans clashed with the Spanish in a series of three battles from 2 to 5 September 1519, and at one point, Diaz remarked, "they surrounded us on every side". After Cortés continued to release prisoners with messages of peace, and realizing the Spanish were enemies of Moctezuma, Xicotencatl the Elder and Maxixcatzin persuaded the Tlaxcalan warleader, Xicotencatl the Younger, that it would be better to ally with the newcomers than to kill them.

In October 1519, Cortés and his men, accompanied by about 1,000 Tlaxcalteca, marched to Cholula, the second-largest pre-Columbian city in central Mexico. Cortés, either in a pre-meditated effort to instill fear upon the Aztecs waiting for him at Tenochtitlan or (as he later claimed, when he was being investigated) wishing to make an example when he feared native treachery, massacred thousands of unarmed members of the nobility gathered at the central plaza, then partially burned the city.

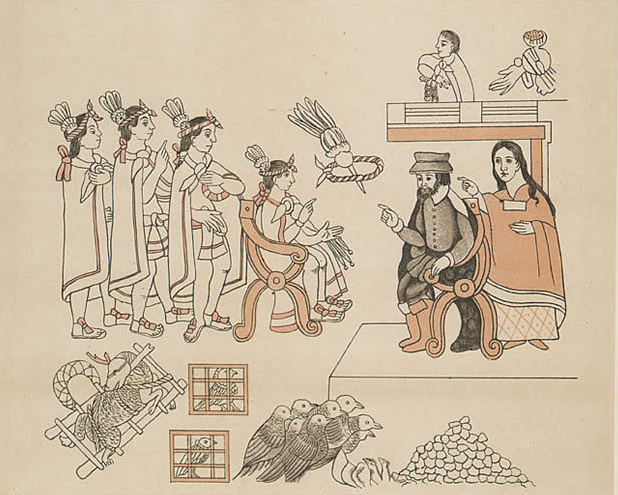
Cortés and La Malinche meet Moctezuma in Tenochtitlán, November 8, 1519.

By the time he arrived in Tenochtitlán, the Spaniards had a large army. On 8 November 1519, they were peacefully received by Moctezuma II. Moctezuma deliberately let Cortés enter the Aztec capital, the island city of Tenochtitlán, hoping to get to know their weaknesses better and to crush them later.

Moctezuma gave lavish gifts of gold to the Spaniards, which, rather than placating them, excited their ambitions for plunder. In his letters to King Charles, Cortés claimed to have learned at this point that he was considered by the Aztecs to be either an emissary of the feathered serpent god Quetzalcoatl or Quetzalcoatl himself—a belief which has been contested by a few modern historians. But quickly Cortés learned that several Spaniards on the coast had been killed by Aztecs while supporting the Totonacs, and decided to take Moctezuma as a hostage in his palace, indirectly ruling Tenochtitlán through him.

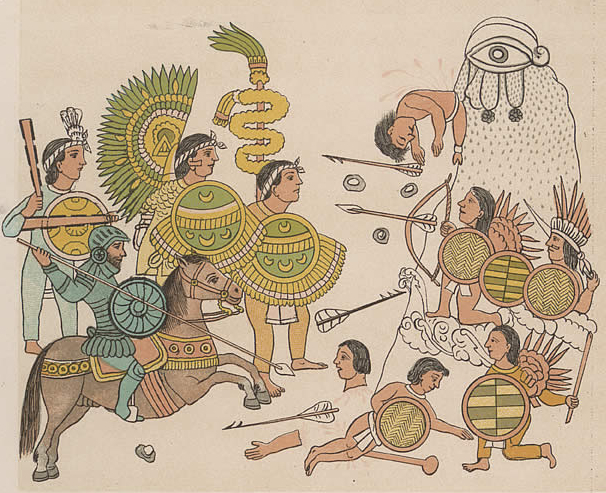
Cristóbal de Olid leads Spanish soldiers with Tlaxcalan allies in the conquests of Jalisco, 1522.

Meanwhile, Velázquez sent another expedition, led by Pánfilo de Narváez, to oppose Cortés, arriving in Mexico in April 1520 with 1,100 men. Cortés left 200 men in Tenochtitlán and took the rest to confront Narváez. He overcame Narváez, despite his numerical inferiority, and convinced the rest of Narváez's men to join him. In Mexico, one of Cortés's lieutenants Pedro de Alvarado, committed the massacre in the Great Temple, triggering a local rebellion.

Cortés speedily returned to Tenochtitlán. On 1 July 1520, Moctezuma was killed (he was stoned to death by his own people, as reported in Spanish accounts; although some claim he was murdered by the Spaniards once they realized his inability to placate the locals). Faced with a hostile population, Cortés decided to flee to Tlaxcala. During the Noche Triste (30 June – 1 July 1520), the Spaniards managed a narrow escape from Tenochtitlán across the Tlacopan causeway, while their rearguard was being massacred. Much of the treasure looted by Cortés was lost (as well as his artillery) during this panicked escape from Tenochtitlán.

=== Destruction of Tenochtitlán ===
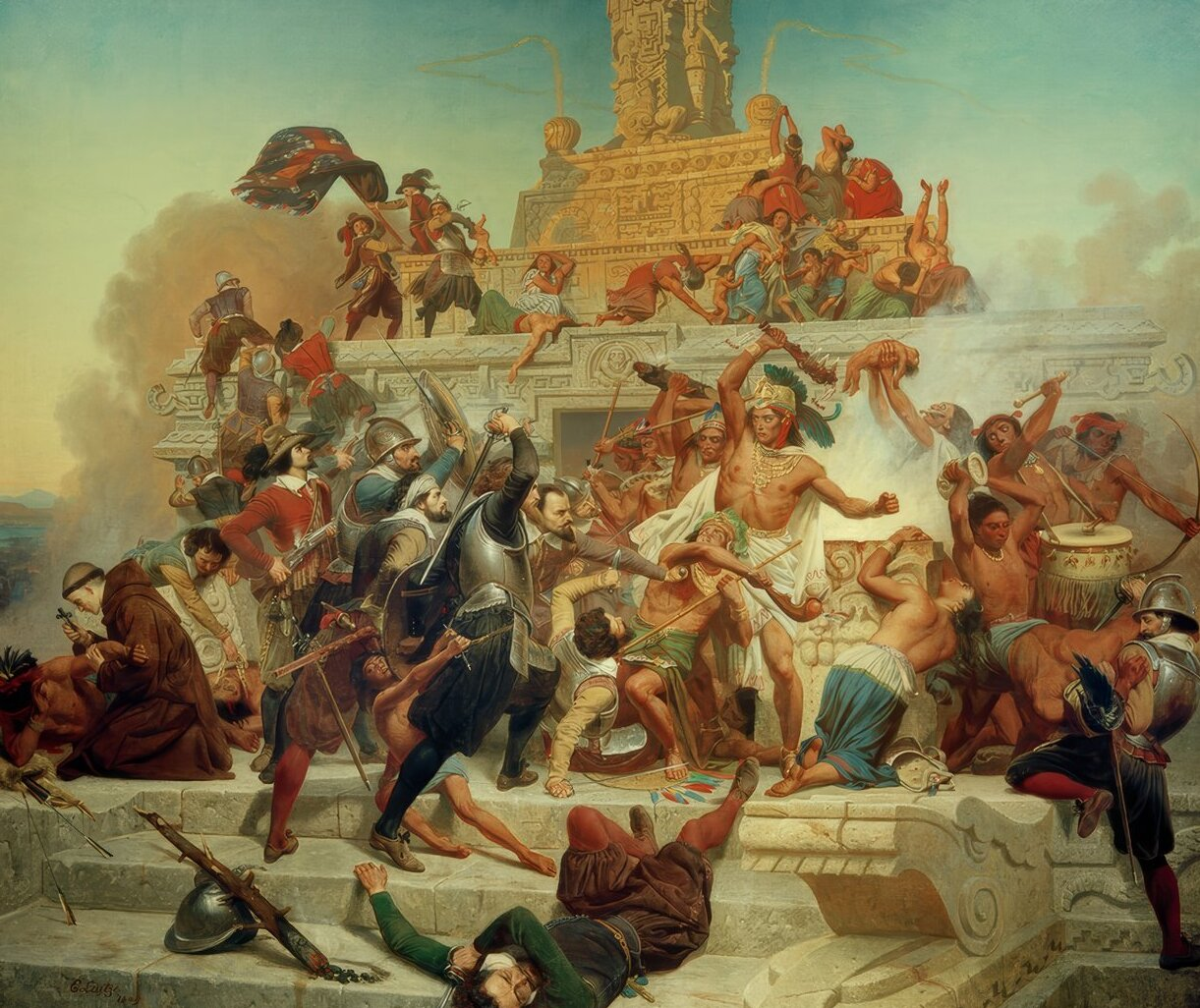
The Storming of the Teocalli by Cortez and His Troops (Emanuel Leutze, 1848)

After the battle of Otumba, they managed to reach Tlaxcala, having lost 870 men. With the assistance of their allies, Cortés's men finally prevailed, with reinforcements arriving from Cuba. Cortés began a policy of attrition towards Tenochtitlán, cutting off supplies and subduing the Aztecs' allied cities. During the siege, he would construct brigantines in the lake and slowly destroy blocks of the city to avoid fighting in an urban setting. The Mexicas would fall back to Tlatelolco and even succeed in ambushing the pursuing Spanish forces, inflicting heavy losses, but would ultimately be the last portion of the island that resisted the conquistadores. The siege of Tenochtitlan ended with Spanish victory and the destruction of the city.

In January 1521, Cortés countered a conspiracy against him, headed by Antonio de Villafana, who was hanged for the offence. Finally, with the capture of Cuauhtémoc, the tlatoani (ruler) of Tenochtitlán, on 13 August 1521, the Aztecs were conquered, and Cortés was able to claim it for Spain, thus renaming the Colonial capital to Mexico City. Mesoamerica would be used for European colonization of the Americas, including the methods of slavery and ethnic cleansing. From 1521 to 1524, Cortés personally governed over Mexico.

== Appointment to the governorship of New Spain and internal dissensions ==
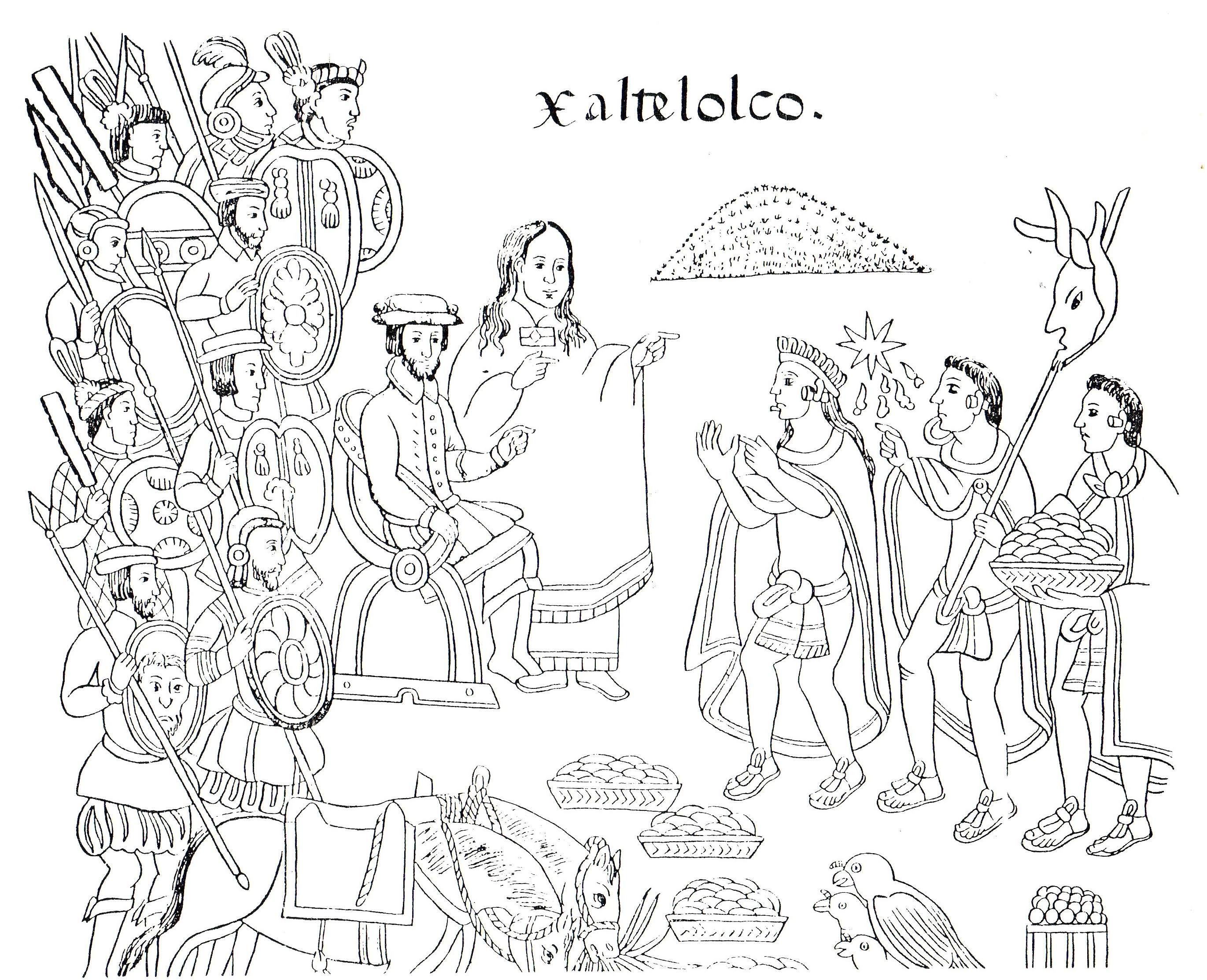
A painting from Diego Muñoz Camargo's History of Tlaxcala (Lienzo Tlaxcala), c. 1585, showing La Malinche and Hernán Cortés

Many historical sources have conveyed an impression that Cortés was unjustly treated by the Spanish Crown, and that he received nothing but ingratitude for his role in establishing New Spain. This picture is the one Cortés presents in his letters and in the later biography written by Francisco López de Gómara. However, there may be more to the picture than this. Cortés's own sense of accomplishment, entitlement, and vanity may have played a part in his deteriorating position with the king:

Cortés personally was not ungenerously rewarded, but he speedily complained of insufficient compensation to himself and his comrades. Thinking himself beyond the reach of restraint, he disobeyed many of the orders of the Crown, and, what was more imprudent, said so in a letter to the emperor, dated October 15, 1524 (Ycazbalceta, "Documentos para la Historia de México", Mexico, 1858, I). In this letter, Cortés, besides recalling in a rather abrupt manner that the conquest of Mexico was due to him alone, deliberately acknowledges his disobedience in terms which could not fail to create a most unfavourable impression.

King Charles appointed Cortés as governor, captain general and chief justice of the newly conquered territory, dubbed "New Spain of the Ocean Sea". But also, much to the dismay of Cortés, four royal officials were appointed at the same time to assist him in his governing—in effect, submitting him to close observation and administration. Cortés initiated the construction of Mexico City, destroying Aztec temples and buildings and then rebuilding on the Aztec ruins what soon became the most important European city in the Americas.

Cortés managed the founding of new cities and appointed men to extend Spanish rule to all of New Spain, imposing the encomienda system in 1524. He reserved many encomiendas for himself and for his retinue, which they considered just rewards for their accomplishment in conquering central Mexico. However, later arrivals and members of factions antipathetic to Cortés complained of the favouritism that excluded them.

In 1523, the Spanish Crown (possibly influenced by Cortés's enemy, Bishop Fonseca), sent a military force under the command of Francisco de Garay to conquer and settle the northern part of Mexico, the region of Pánuco. This was another setback for Cortés, who had mentioned this in his fourth letter to the King in which he describes himself as the victim of a conspiracy by his archenemies Diego Velázquez de Cuéllar, Diego Columbus and Bishop Fonseca as well as Francisco Garay. The influence of Garay was effectively stopped by this appeal to the King, who sent out a decree forbidding Garay to interfere in the politics of New Spain, causing him to give up without a fight.

== Royal grant of arms (1525) ==
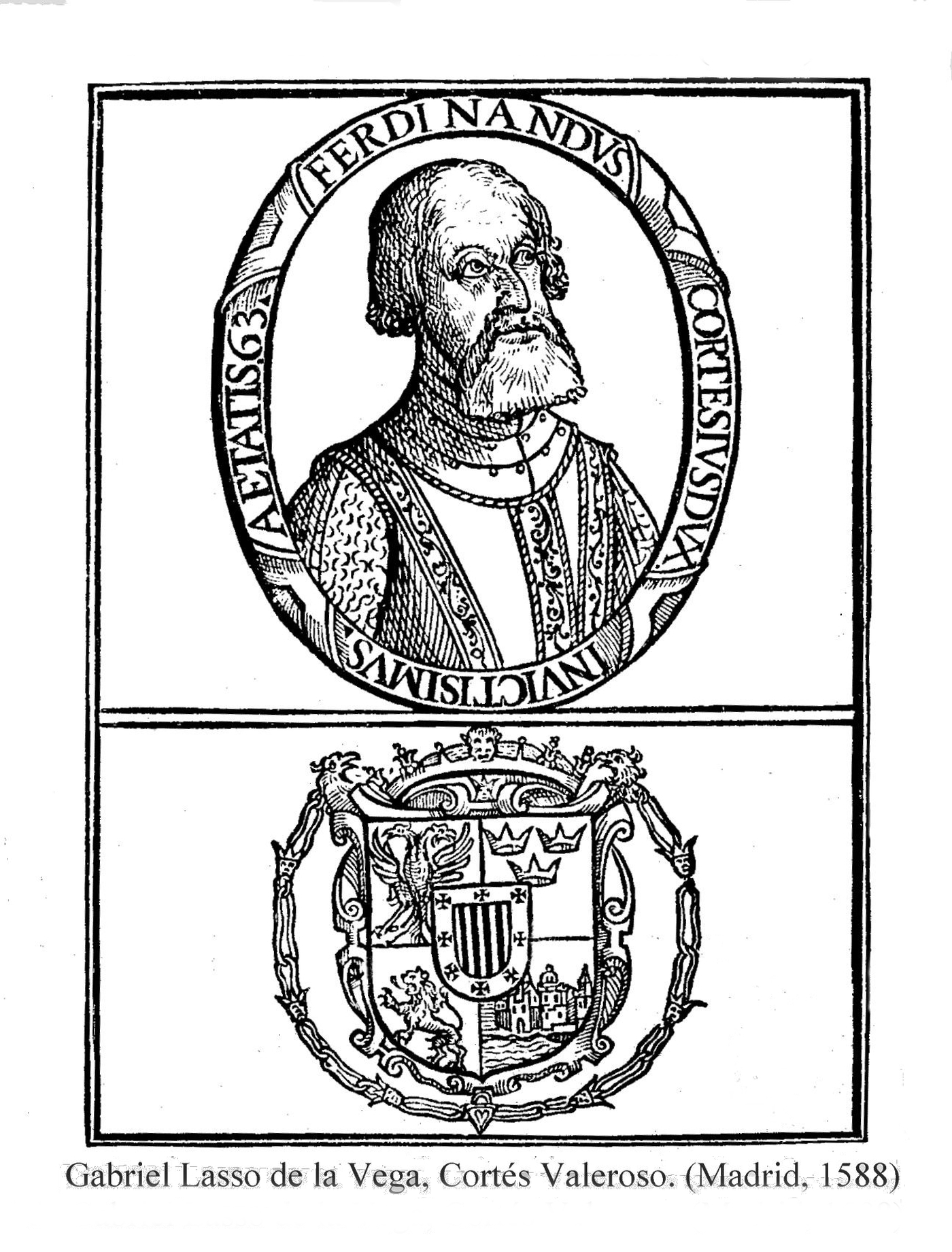
The coat of arms awarded to Cortés, by King Carlos I of Spain

Although Cortés had flouted the authority of Diego Velázquez in sailing to the mainland and then leading an expedition of conquest, Cortés's spectacular success was rewarded by the crown with a coat of arms, a mark of high honour, following the conqueror's request. The document granting the coat of arms summarizes Cortés's accomplishments in the conquest of Mexico. The proclamation of the king says in part:

We, respecting the many labors, dangers, and adventures which you underwent as stated above, and so that there might remain a perpetual memorial of you and your services and that you and your descendants might be more fully honored ... it is our will that besides your coat of arms of your lineage, which you have, you may have and bear as your coat of arms, known and recognized, a shield ...

The grant specifies the iconography of the coat of arms, the central portion divided into quadrants. In the upper portion, there is a "black eagle with two heads on a white field, which are the arms of the empire". Below that is a "golden lion on a red field, in memory of the fact that you, the said Hernando Cortés, by your industry and effort brought matters to the state described above" (i.e., the conquest). The specificity of the other two quadrants is linked directly to Mexico, with one quadrant showing three crowns representing the three Aztec emperors of the conquest era, Moctezuma, Cuitlahuac, and Cuauhtemoc and the other showing the Aztec capital of Tenochtitlan. Encircling the central shield are symbols of the seven city-states around the lake and their lords that Cortés defeated, with the lords "to be shown as prisoners bound with a chain which shall be closed with a lock beneath the shield".

== Death of his first wife and remarriage ==
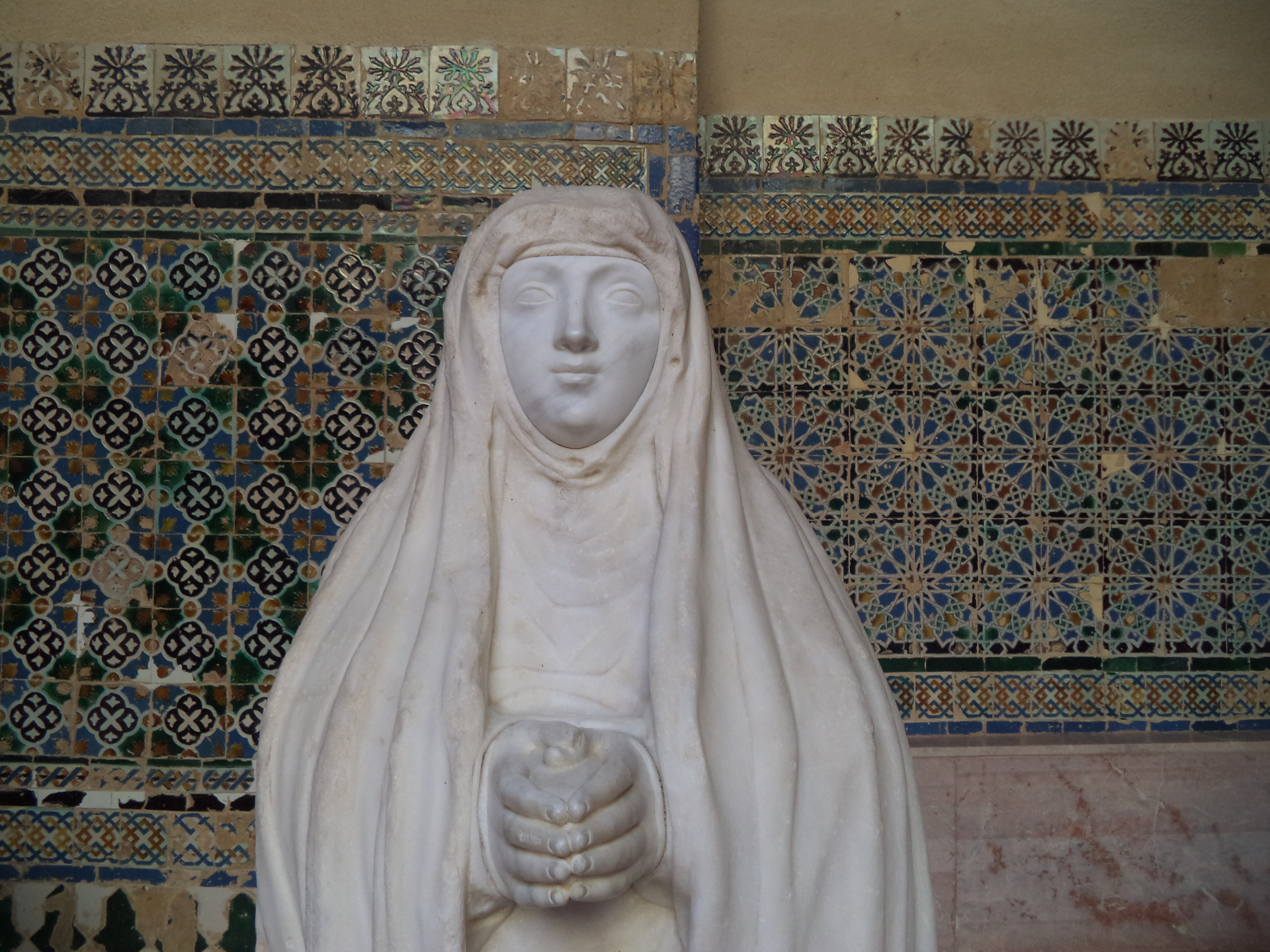
Sculpture of Juana de Zúñiga, second wife of Cortés, for her tomb

Cortés's wife, Catalina Súarez, arrived in New Spain around the summer of 1522, along with her sister and brother. His marriage to Catalina was at this point extremely awkward, since she was a kinswoman of the governor of Cuba, Diego Velázquez, whose authority Cortés had thrown off and who was therefore now his enemy. Catalina lacked the noble title of doña, so at this point, his marriage with her no longer raised his status. Their marriage had been childless. Since Cortés had sired children with a variety of indigenous women, including a son around 1522 by his cultural translator, Doña Marina, Cortés knew he was capable of fathering children. Cortés's only male heir at this point was illegitimate, but nonetheless named after Cortés's father, Martín Cortés. This son Martín Cortés was also popularly called "El Mestizo".

Catalina Suárez died under mysterious circumstances the night of 1–2 November 1522. There were accusations at the time that Cortés had murdered his wife. There was an investigation into her death, interviewing a variety of household residents and others. The documentation of the investigation was published in the nineteenth century in Mexico, and these archival documents were uncovered in the twentieth century. The death of Catalina Suárez produced a scandal and investigation, but Cortés was now free to marry someone of high status more appropriate to his wealth and power. In 1526, he built an imposing residence for himself, the Palace of Cortés in Cuernavaca, in a region close to the capital where he had extensive encomienda holdings. In 1529, he had been accorded the noble designation of don, but more importantly, was given the noble title of Marquess of the Valley of Oaxaca and married the Spanish noblewoman Doña Juana de Zúñiga. The marriage produced three children, including another son, who was also named Martín. As the first-born legitimate son, Don Martín Cortés y Zúñiga was now Cortés's heir and succeeded him as holder of the title and estate of the Marquessate of the Valley of Oaxaca. Cortés's legitimate daughters were Doña Maria, Doña Catalina, and Doña Juana.

== Cortés and the "Spiritual Conquest" of the Aztec Empire ==
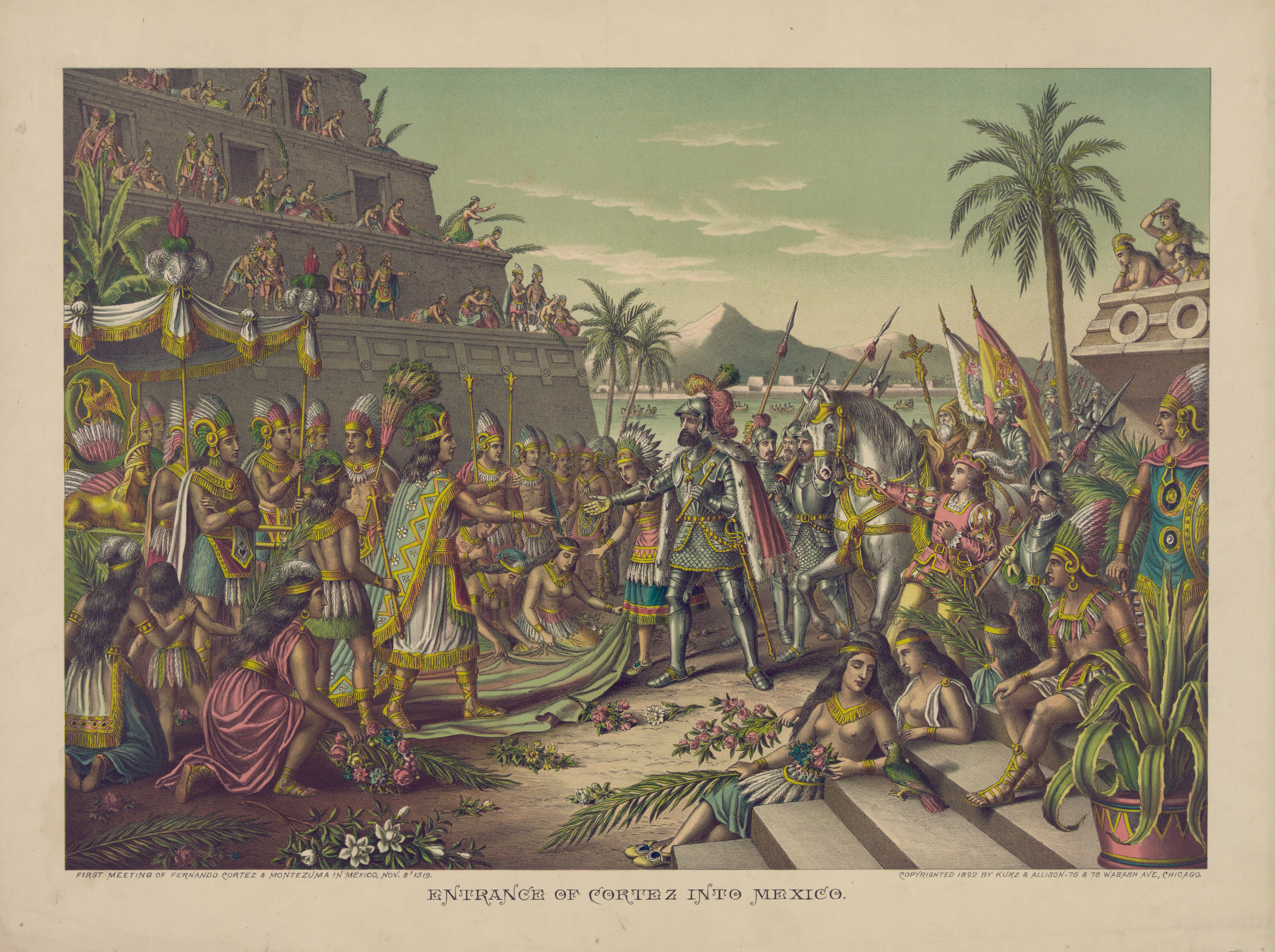
Meeting of Hernán Cortés and Moctezuma II

Since the conversion to Christianity of American Indians was an essential and integral part of the extension of Spanish colonial power, making formal provisions for that conversion once the military conquest was completed was an important task for Cortés.

During the Age of Discovery, the Catholic Church had seen early attempts at conversion in the Caribbean islands by Spanish friars, particularly the mendicant orders. Cortés made a request to the Spanish monarch to send Franciscan and Dominican friars to Mexico to convert the vast indigenous populations to Christianity. In his fourth letter to the king, Cortés pleaded for friars rather than diocesan or secular priests because those clerics were, in his view, a serious danger to the Indians' conversion.

If these people [Indians] were now to see the affairs of the Church and the service of God in the hands of canons or other dignitaries, and saw them indulge in the vices and profanities now common in Spain, knowing that such men were the ministers of God, it would bring our Faith into much harm that I believe any further preaching would be of no avail.

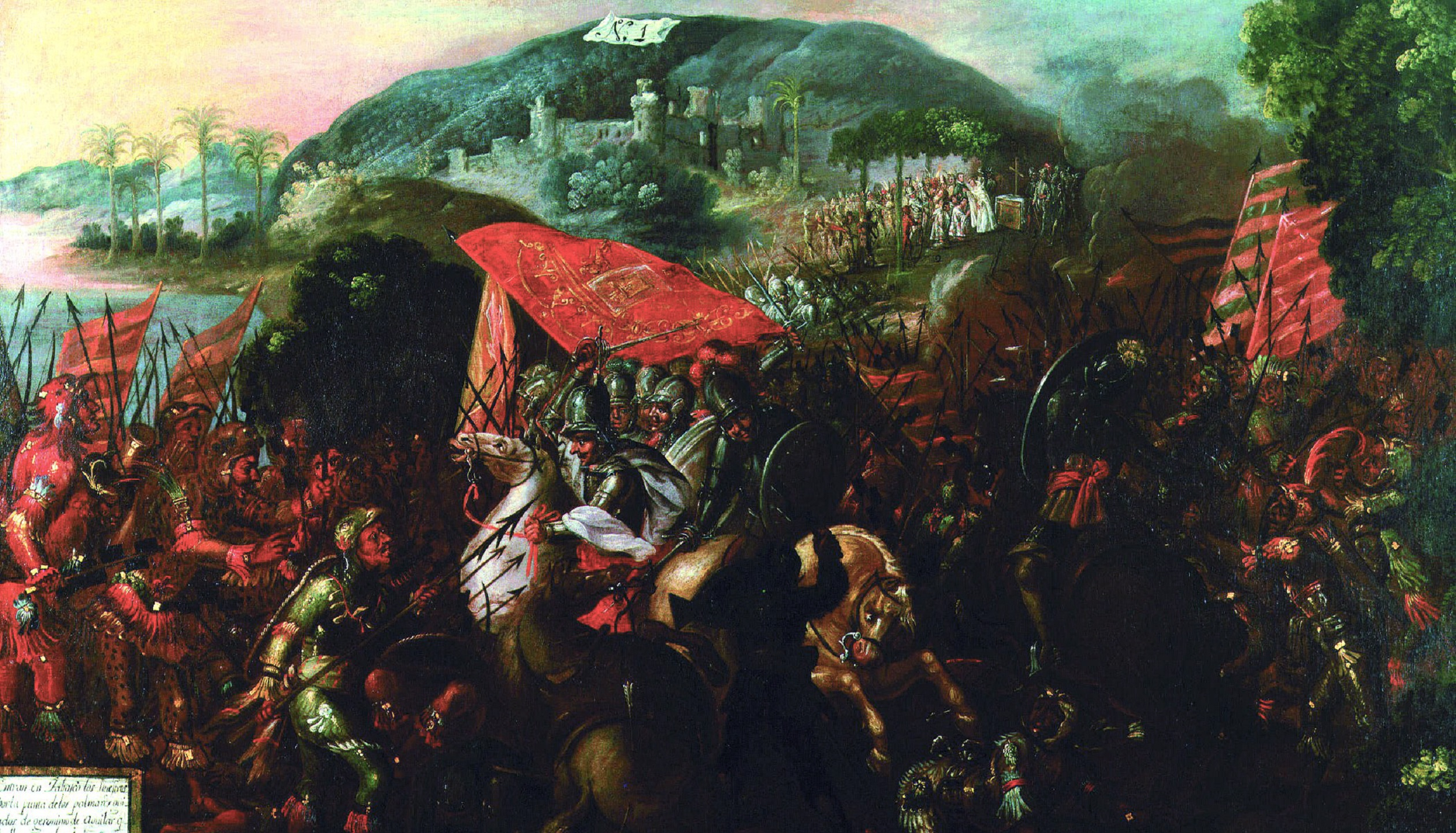
The Entry of Hernán Cortés into Tabasco. Painting from the second half of the 17th century. Jay I. Kislak Collection at the Library of Congress.

He wished the mendicants to be the main evangelists. Mendicant friars did not usually have full priestly powers to perform all the sacraments needed for the conversion of the Indians and the growth of the neophytes in the Christian faith, so Cortés laid out a solution to this to the king.

Your Majesty should likewise beseech His Holiness [the pope] to grant these powers to the two principal persons in the religious orders that are to come here, and that they should be his delegates, one from the Order of St. Francis and the other from the Order of St. Dominic. They should bring the most extensive powers Your Majesty is able to obtain, for, because these lands are so far from the Church of Rome, and we, the Christians who now reside here and shall do so in the future, are so far from the proper remedies of our consciences and, as we are human, so subject to sin, it is essential that His Holiness should be generous with us and grant to these persons most extensive powers, to be handed down to persons actually in residence here whether it be given to the general of each order or to his provincials.

The Franciscans arrived in May 1524, a symbolically powerful group of twelve known as the Twelve Apostles of Mexico, led by Fray Martín de Valencia. Franciscan Geronimo de Mendieta claimed that Cortés's most important deed was the way he met this first group of Franciscans. The conqueror himself was said to have met the friars as they approached the capital, kneeling at the feet of the friars who had walked from the coast. This story was told by Franciscans to demonstrate Cortés's piety and humility and was a powerful message to all, including the Indians, that Cortés's earthly power was subordinate to the spiritual power of the friars. However, one of the first twelve Franciscans, Fray Toribio de Benavente Motolinia does not mention it in his history. Cortés and the Franciscans had a particularly strong alliance in Mexico, with Franciscans seeing him as "the new Moses" for conquering Mexico and opening it to Christian evangelization. In Motolinia's 1555 response to Dominican Bartolomé de Las Casas, he praises Cortés.

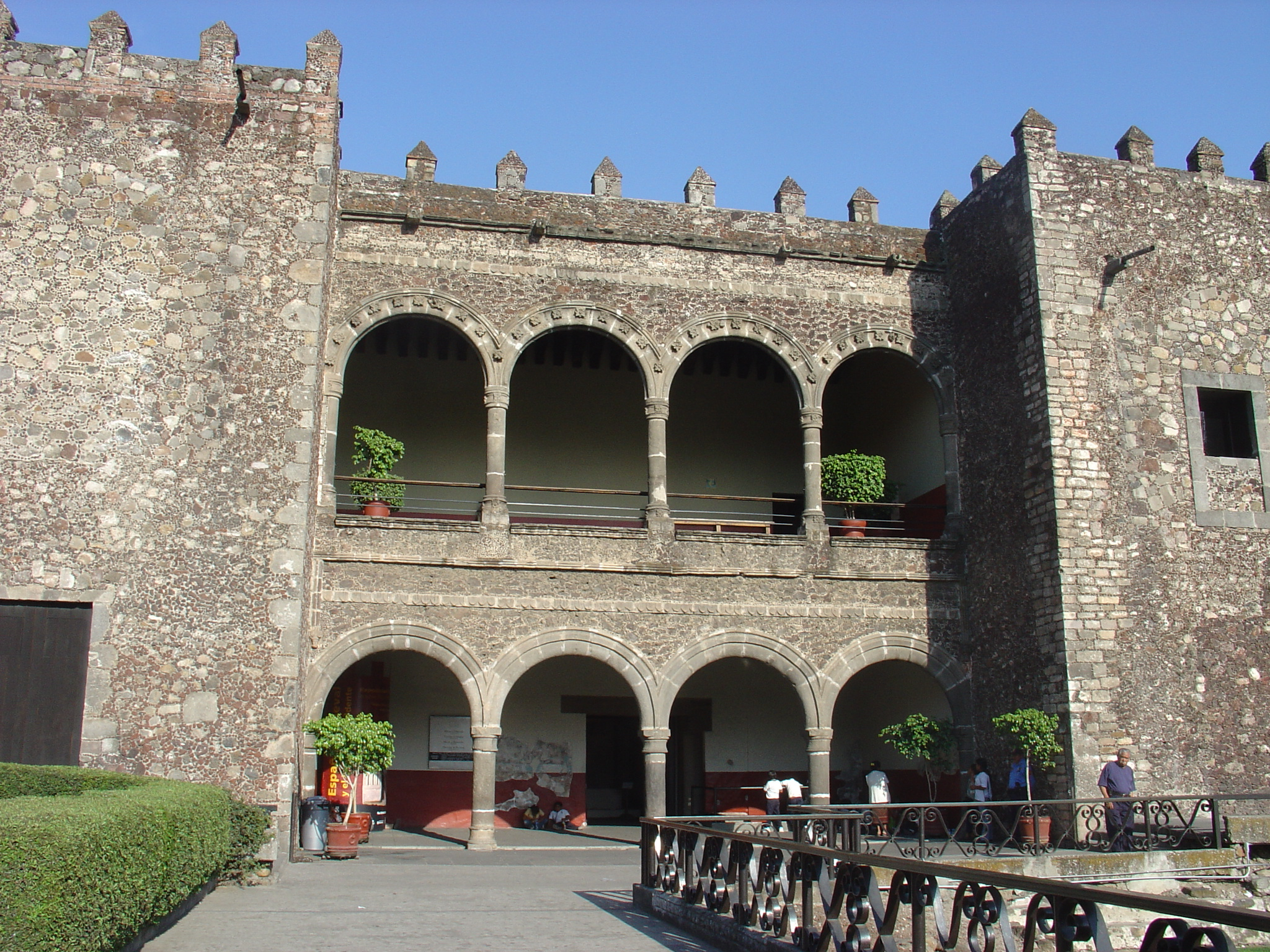
Palace of Hernán Cortés in Cuernavaca, Morelos, Mexico.

And as to those who murmur against the Marqués del Valle [Cortés], God rest him, and who try to blacken and obscure his deeds, I believe that before God their deeds are not as acceptable as those of the Marqués. Although as a human he was a sinner, he had faith and works of a good Christian, and a great desire to employ his life and property in widening and augmenting the fair of Jesus Christ, and dying for the conversion of these gentiles ... Who has loved and defended the Indians of this new world like Cortés? ... Through this captain, God opened the door for us to preach his holy gospel and it was he who caused the Indians to revere the holy sacraments and respect the ministers of the church.

In Fray Bernardino de Sahagún's 1585 revision of the conquest narrative first codified as Book XII of the Florentine Codex, there are laudatory references to Cortés that do not appear in the earlier text from the indigenous perspective. Whereas Book XII of the Florentine Codex concludes with an account of Spaniards' search for gold, in Sahagún's 1585 revised account, he ends with praise of Cortés for requesting the Franciscans be sent to Mexico to convert the Indians.

== Expedition to Honduras and aftermath (1524–1541) ==
=== Expedition to Honduras (1524–1526) ===
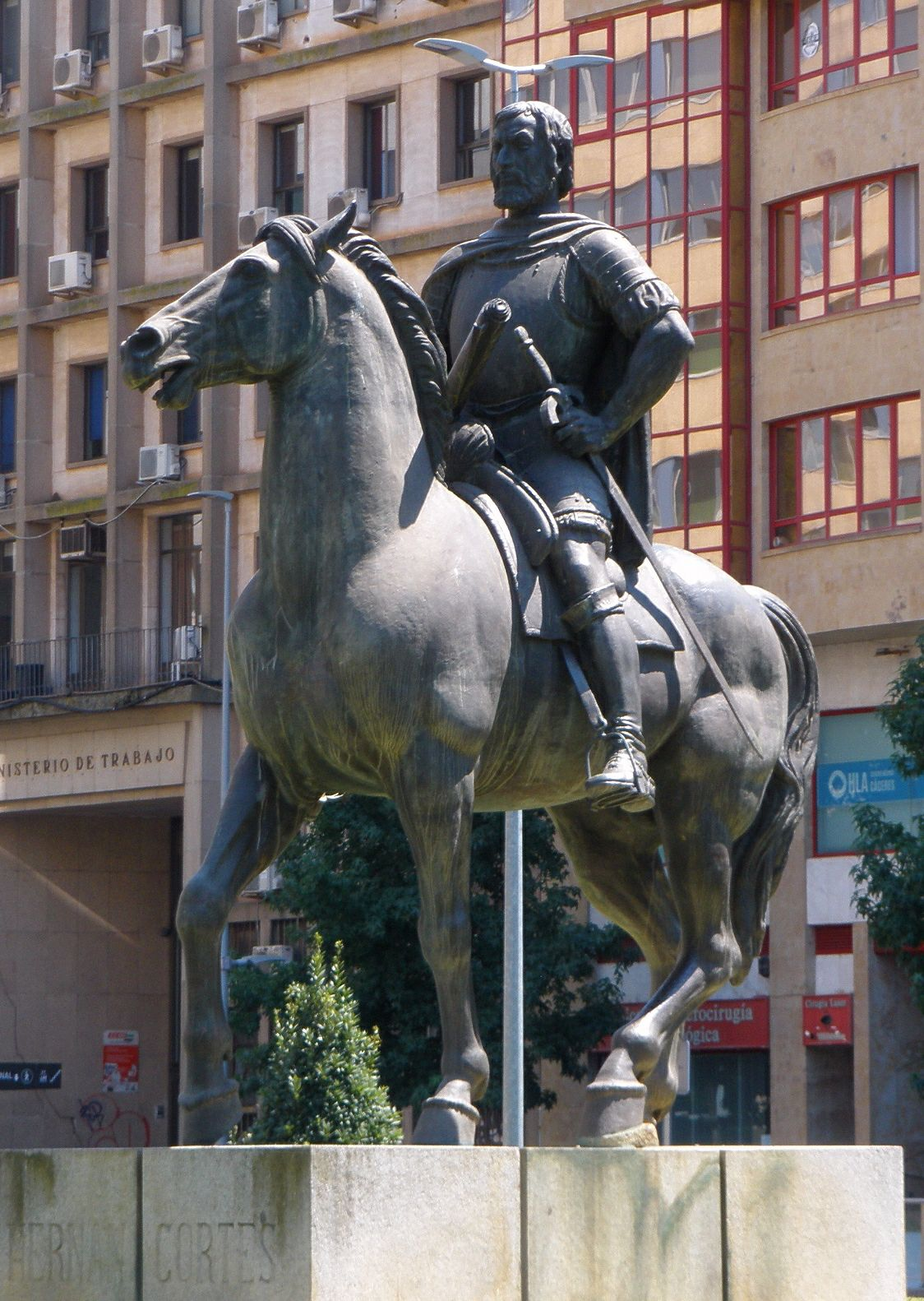
Equestrian statue of Hernán Cortés in Cáceres, Spain

From 1524 to 1526, Cortés headed an expedition to Honduras where he defeated Cristóbal de Olid, who had claimed Honduras as his own under the influence of the Governor of Cuba, Diego Velázquez. Fearing that Cuauhtémoc might head an insurrection in Mexico, he brought him with him to Honduras. In a controversial move, Cuauhtémoc was executed during the journey. Raging over Olid's treason, Cortés issued a decree to arrest Velázquez, whom he was sure was behind Olid's actions. This, however, only served to further estrange the Crown of Castile and the Council of the Indies, both of which were already beginning to feel anxious about Cortés's rising power.

Cortés's fifth letter to King Charles attempts to justify his conduct, concludes with a bitter attack on "various and powerful rivals and enemies" who have "obscured the eyes of your Majesty". Charles, who was also Holy Roman Emperor, had little time for distant colonies (much of Charles's reign was taken up with wars with France, the German Protestants and the expanding Ottoman Empire), except insofar as they contributed to finance his wars. In 1521, the year of the Conquest, Charles was attending to matters in his German domains, and Bishop Adrian of Utrecht functioned as regent in Spain.

Velázquez and Fonseca persuaded the regent to appoint a commissioner (a Juez de residencia, Luis Ponce de León) with powers to investigate Cortés's conduct and even arrest him. Cortés was once quoted as saying that it was "more difficult to contend against [his] own countrymen than against the Aztecs." Governor Diego Velázquez continued to be a thorn in his side, teaming up with Bishop Juan Rodríguez de Fonseca, chief of the Spanish colonial department, to undermine him in the Council of the Indies.

Before leaving for Honduras, on 12 October 1524, Cortés had left in charge three of the five officials that made up the Tribunal de Cuentas set up by Charles V to oversee Cortés' rule: Alonso de Estrada; Rodrigo de Albornoz; and Alonso de Zuazo. The other two Gonzalo de Salazar and Pedro Almíndez Chirino (aka 'Peralmíndez'), accompanied him on campaign.

While en route, word reached Cortés that disagreements between Albornoz and Estrada were becoming violent to the point of swordplay. He therefore ordered Salazar and Almíndez Chirino back to Mexico City to rejoin the government, which they did on 29 December 1524.

Salazar and Almíndez Chirino spread a rumour that Cortés had died, and in May 1525 assumed all power for themselves, including seizing Cortés' property and torturing his majordomo, Cortés' cousin, Rodrigo de Paz, to reveal the whereabouts of his alleged treasure. Zuazo was forced into exile.

At the end of January 1526, Cortés got a message back to his supporters that he was still alive. Salazar and Almíndez Chirino were deposed and arrested, and Albornoz and Estrada resumed office. Cortés himself took another five months to return from his expedition, reaching Mexico City on 19 June, whereupon he rested up in the Franciscan monastery for 5 nights.

A day or so later, Ponce de León finally arrived in Mexico City to take over from Cortés as governor of New Spain and begin the juez de residencia. The Licentiate then fell ill and died shortly after his arrival, appointing Marcos de Aguilar as alcalde mayor. In February 1527, the aged Aguilar fell ill in his turn and, before his death, appointed Alonso de Estrada to the position of governor, in which function he was confirmed by royal decree in August 1527. Cortés, suspected of poisoning the two men, refrained from taking over the government.

Albornoz, who had sailed for Spain shortly after Ponce de León's arrival in 1526, persuaded the Council of the Indies on his arrival in Seville to release Salazar and Almíndez Chirino, against Cortés' wishes.

In August 1527, Estrada was confirmed as governor by royal decree. When Cortés protested to Estrada for having one of his adherents' hands cut off without a trial as punishment for his involvement in a brawl, Estrada ordered Cortés exiled to his country estate.

His authority circumscribed, his persecutors unpunished, while yet his retinue suffered from arbitrary punishments and was exiled from the city he'd founded, Cortés sailed for Spain in early 1528 to appeal to his Emperor, Charles V.

=== First return to Spain (1528) and Marquessate of the Valley of Oaxaca ===
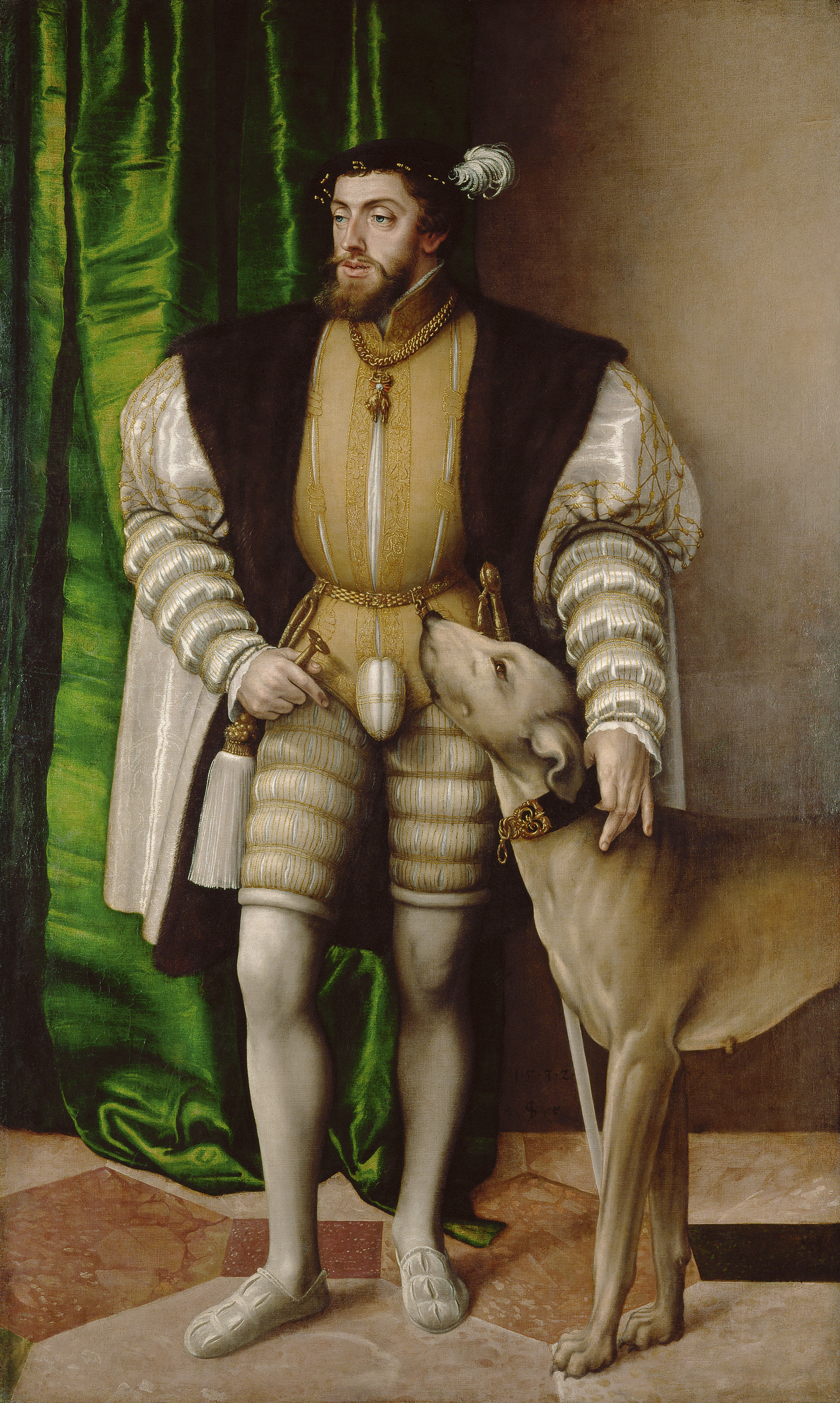
Emperor Charles V with Hound (1532), a painting by the 16th-century artist Jakob Seisenegger

In May 1528, Cortés arrived in Spain with treasures and 40 Aztecs to impress and to appeal to the justice of his master, Charles V. Juan Altamirano and Alonso Valiente stayed in Mexico and acted as Cortés's representatives during his absence. Cortés presented himself with great splendour before Charles V's court. By this time, Charles had returned, and Cortés forthrightly responded to his enemy's charges. Denying he had held back on gold due to the crown, he showed that he had contributed more than the quinto (one-fifth) required. Indeed, he had spent lavishly to build the new capital of Mexico City on the ruins of the Aztec capital of Tenochtitlán, levelled during the siege that brought down the Aztec empire.

He was received by Charles with every distinction and decorated with the Order of Santiago. In return for his efforts in expanding the still young Spanish Empire, Cortés was rewarded in 1529 by being accorded the noble title of don but, more importantly, named the "Marqués del Valle de Oaxaca" (Marquess of the Valley of Oaxaca) and married the Spanish noblewoman Doña Juana Zúñiga, after the 1522 death of his much less distinguished first wife, Catalina Suárez. The noble title and senorial estate of the Marquesado were passed down to his descendants until 1811. The Oaxaca Valley was one of the wealthiest regions of New Spain, and Cortés had 23,000 vassals in 23 named encomiendas in perpetuity.

Although confirmed in his land holdings and vassals, he was not reinstated as governor and was never again given any important office in the administration of New Spain. During his travel to Spain, his property was mismanaged by abusive colonial administrators. He sided with local natives in a lawsuit. The natives documented the abuses in the Huexotzinco Codex.

The entailed estate and title passed to his legitimate son Don Martín Cortés upon Cortés's death in 1547, who became the Second Marquess. Don Martín's association with the so-called Encomenderos' Conspiracy endangered the entailed holdings, but they were restored and remained the continuing reward for Hernán Cortés's family through the generations.

=== Return to the New World (1530) and appointment of a viceroy (1535) ===
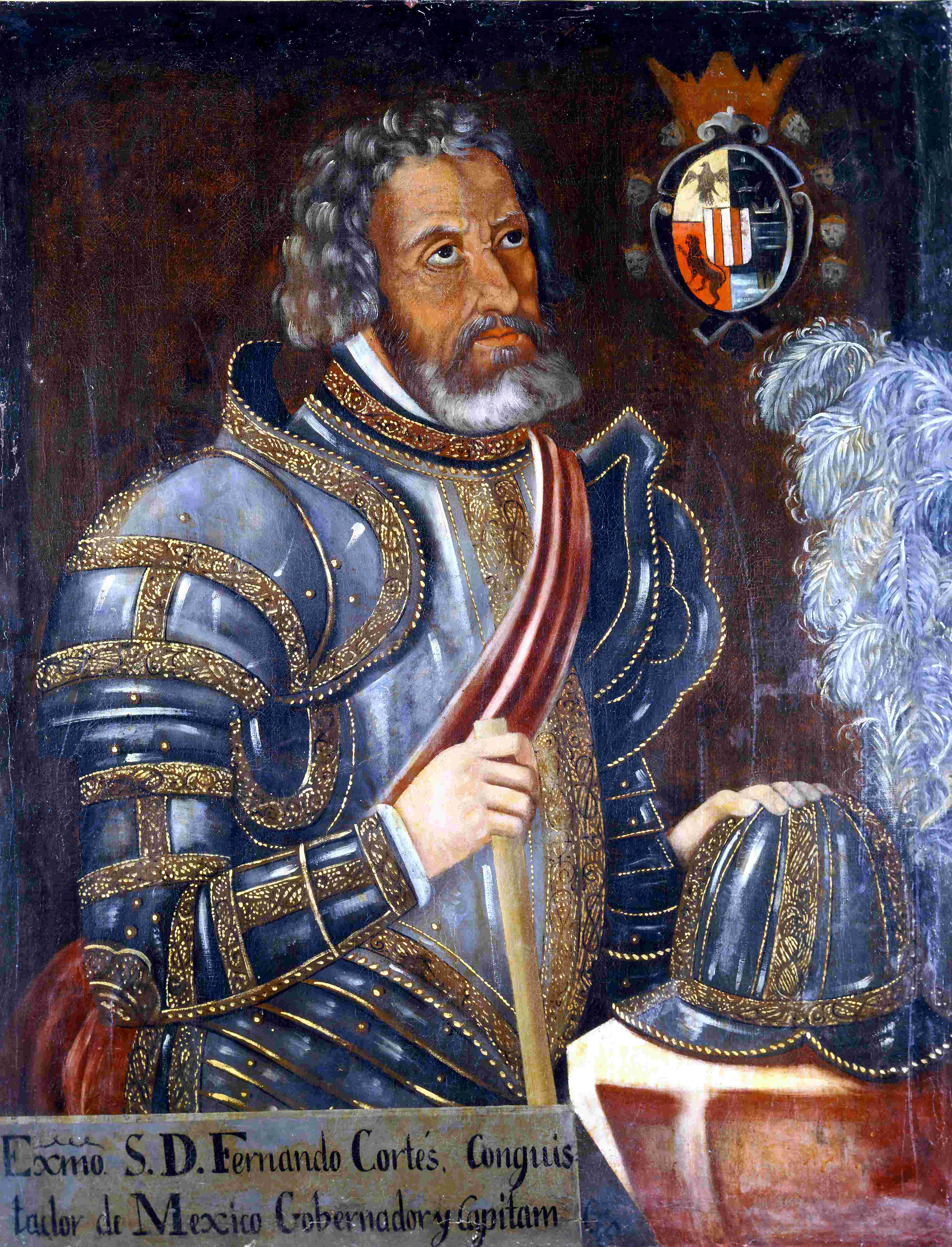
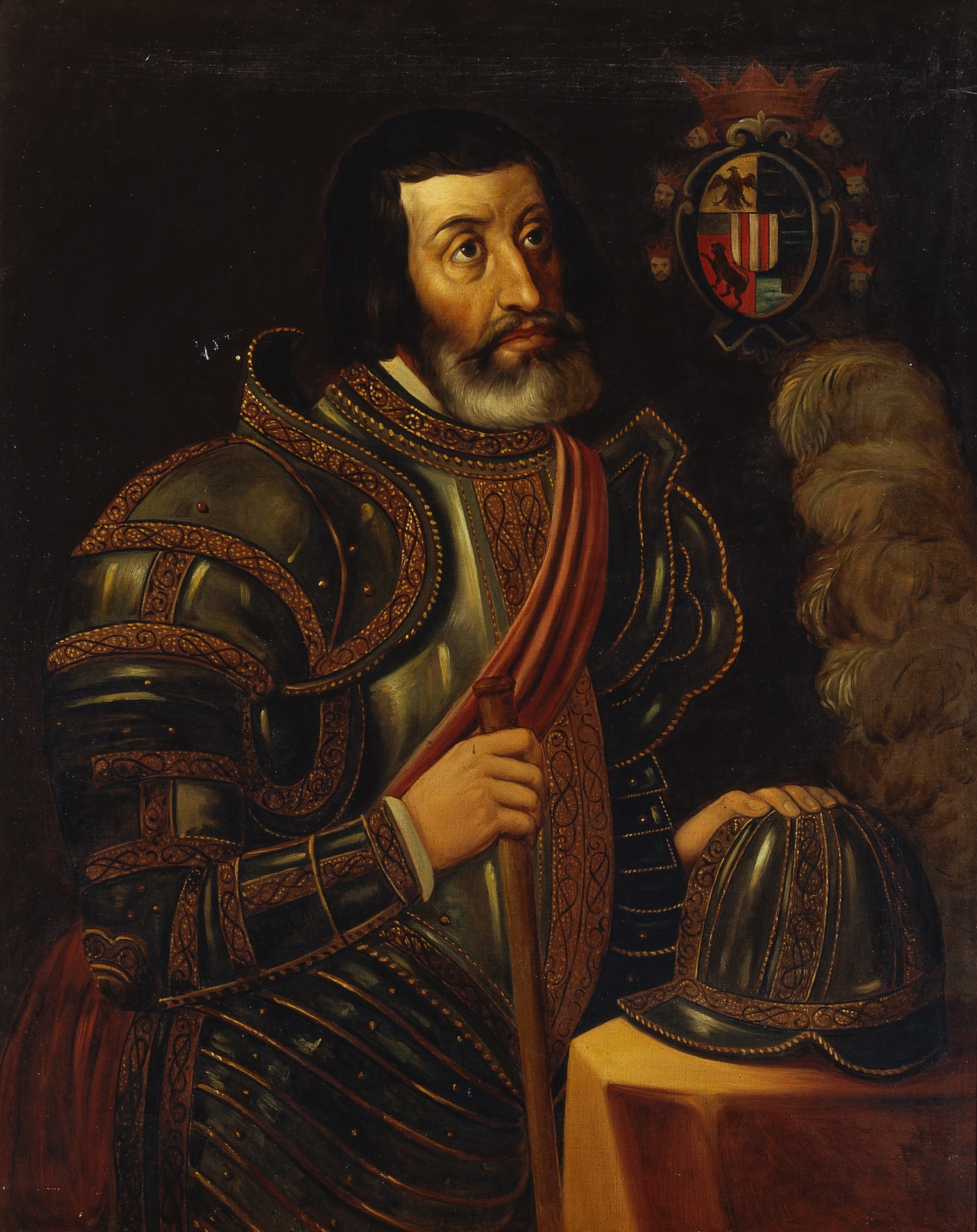
Two copies of the same portrait, the original was likely made during his lifetime. The left copy is dated to the 17th century and the right copy was made by José Salomé Pina, c. 1879. This portrait is characterized by having a different armour from other portraits.

Cortés returned to Mexico in 1530 with new titles and honours. Although Cortés still retained military authority and permission to continue his conquests, Don Antonio de Mendoza was appointed in 1535 as a viceroy to administer New Spain's civil affairs. This division of power led to continual dissension and caused the failure of several enterprises in which Cortés was engaged. On returning to Mexico, Cortés found the country in a state of anarchy. There was a strong suspicion in court circles of an intended rebellion by Cortés.

After reasserting his position and reestablishing some sort of order, Cortés retired to his estates at Cuernavaca, about 30 miles (48 km) south of Mexico City. There, he concentrated on the building of his palace and on Pacific exploration. Remaining in Mexico between 1530 and 1541, Cortés quarrelled with Nuño Beltrán de Guzmán and disputed the right to explore the territory that is today California with Antonio de Mendoza, the first viceroy.

Cortés acquired several silver mines in Zumpango del Rio in 1534. By the early 1540s, he owned 20 silver mines in Sultepec, 12 in Taxco, and 3 in Zacualpan. Earlier, Cortés had claimed the silver in the Tamazula area.

In 1536, Cortés explored the northwestern part of Mexico and discovered the Baja California peninsula. Cortés also spent time exploring the Pacific coast of Mexico. The Gulf of California was originally named the Sea of Cortés by its discoverer Francisco de Ulloa in 1539. This was the last major expedition by Cortés.

== Later life and death ==
=== Second return to Spain ===
After his exploration of Baja California, Cortés returned to Spain in 1541, hoping to confound his angry civilians, who had brought many lawsuits against him (for debts, abuse of power, etc.). On his return, he went through a crowd to speak to the emperor, who demanded of him who he was. "I am a man," replied Cortés, "who has given you more provinces than your ancestors left you cities."

=== Expedition against Algiers ===
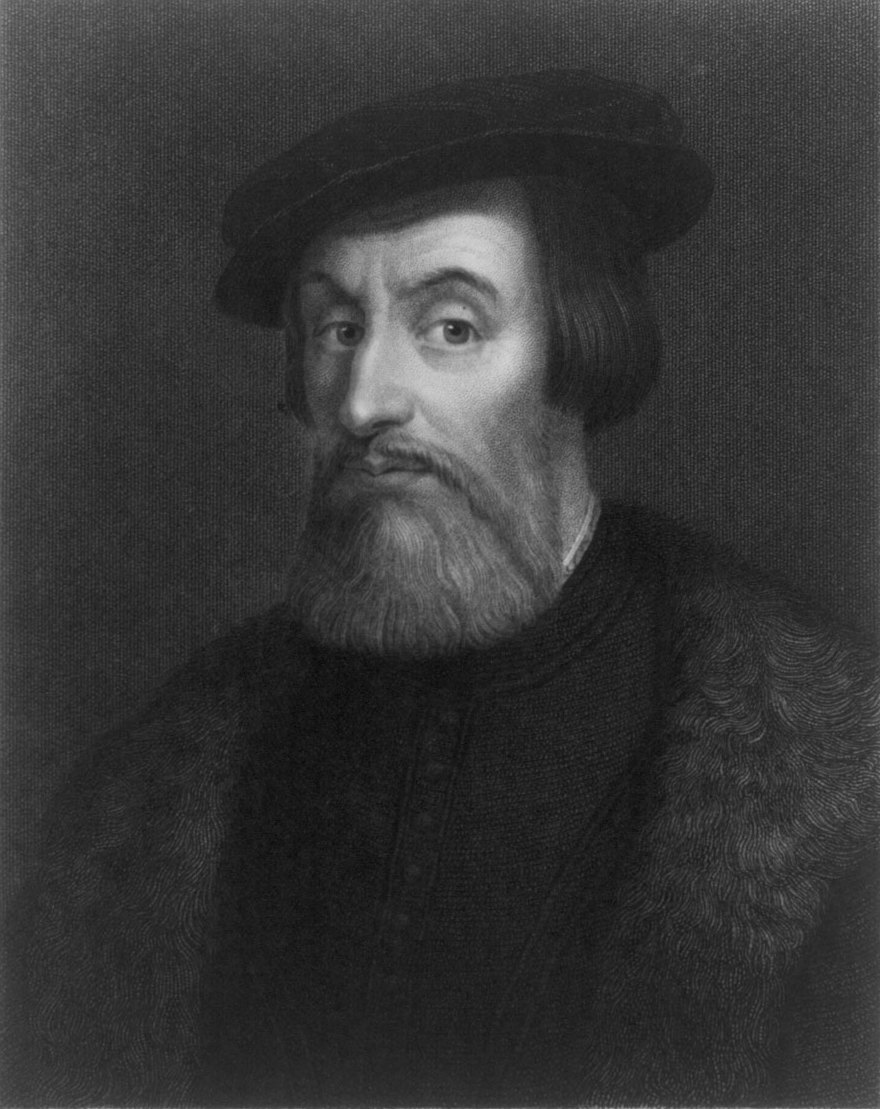
An engraving of a middle-aged Cortés by 19th-century artist William Holl

The emperor finally permitted Cortés to join him and his fleet commanded by Andrea Doria at the great expedition against Algiers in the Barbary Coast in 1541, which was then part of the Ottoman Empire. During this campaign, Cortés was almost drowned in a storm that hit his fleet while he was pursuing the Pasha of Algiers.

=== Last years, death, and remains ===
Having spent a great deal of his own money to finance expeditions, he was now heavily in debt. In February 1544, he made a claim on the royal treasury, but was ignored for the next three years. Disgusted, he decided to return to Mexico in 1547. When he reached Seville, he was stricken with dysentery. He died in Castilleja de la Cuesta, Seville province, on 2 December 1547, from a case of pleurisy at the age of 62.

He left his many mestizo and white children well cared for in his will, along with every one of their mothers. He requested in his will that his remains eventually be buried in Mexico. Before he died he had the Pope remove the "natural" status of four of his children (legitimizing them in the eyes of the church), including Martín, the son he had with Doña Marina (also known as La Malinche), said to be his favourite. His daughter, Doña Catalina, however, died shortly after her father's death.

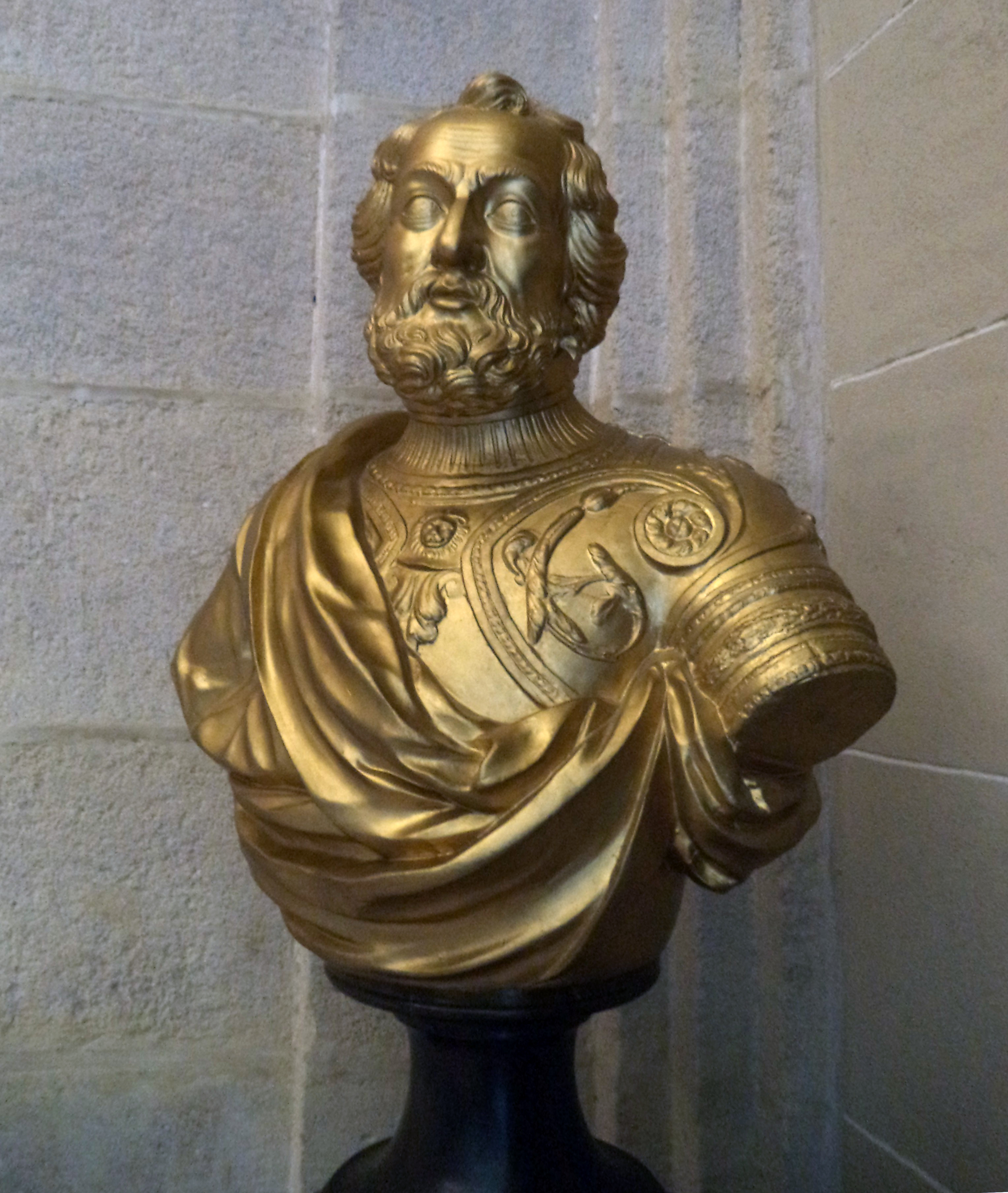
Bust Hernán Cortés in the General Archive of the Indies in Seville

After his death, his body was moved more than eight times for several reasons. On 4 December 1547, he was buried in the mausoleum of the Duke of Medina in the church of San Isidoro del Campo, Sevilla. Three years later (1550), due to the space being required by the duke, his body was moved to the altar of Santa Catarina in the same church. In his testament, Cortés asked for his body to be buried in the monastery he had ordered to be built in Coyoacan in México, ten years after his death, but the monastery was never built. So in 1566, his body was sent to New Spain and buried in the church of San Francisco de Texcoco, where his mother and one of his sisters were buried.

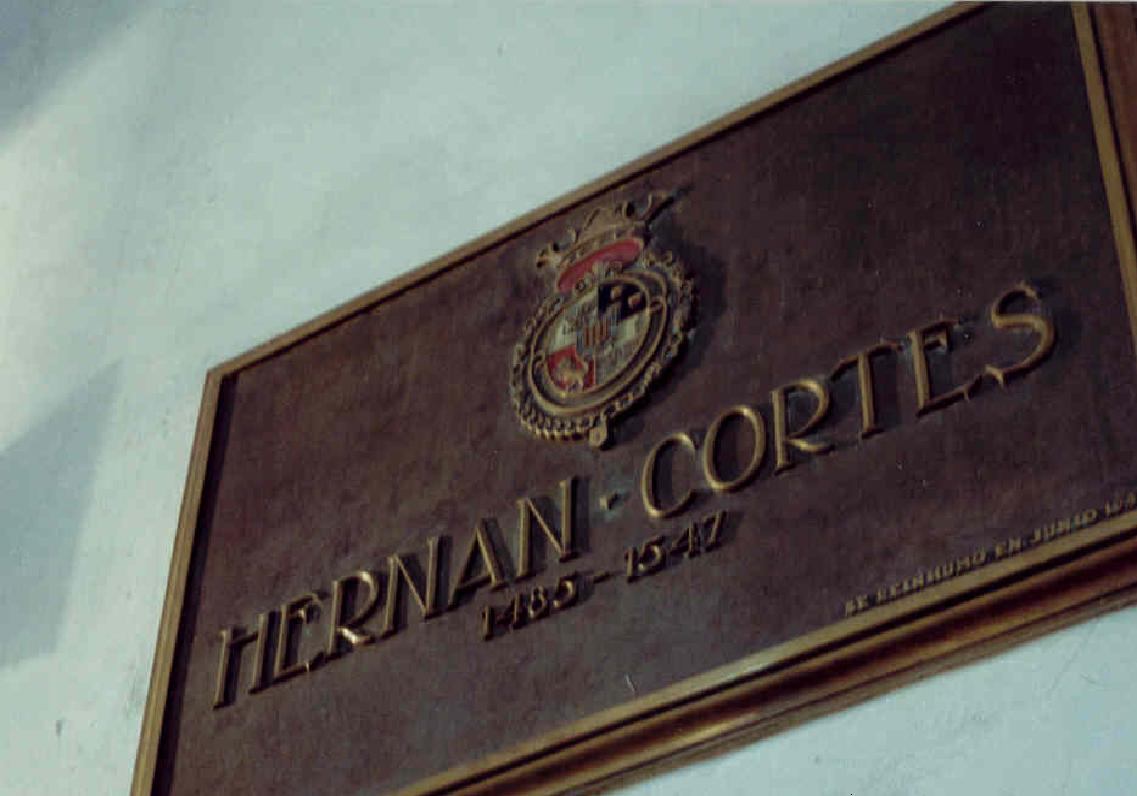
Tomb of Cortés in the Hospital de Jesús Nazareno, which he founded in Mexico City

In 1629, Cortés's last male descendant, Don Pedro Cortés, fourth Marquez del Valle, died. The viceroy decided to move the bones of Cortés, along with those of his descendant, to the Spanish Franciscan church in México. This was delayed for nine years, while his body stayed in the main room of the palace of the viceroy. Eventually, it was moved to the Sagrario of the Franciscan church, where it stayed for 87 years. In 1716, it was moved to another place in the same church. In 1794, his bones were then eventually moved to the "Hospital de Jesus" (founded by Cortés himself), where a statue by Tolsá and a mausoleum were made. There was a public ceremony and all the churches in the city rang their bells.

In 1823, after the independence of México, it seemed imminent that his body would be desecrated, so the mausoleum was removed, the statue and the coat of arms were sent to Palermo, Sicily, to be protected by the Duke of Terranova. The bones were hidden, and everyone thought that they had been sent out of México. In 1836, his bones were moved to another place in the same building.

It was not until 24 November 1946, The conquistador's resting place was rediscovered, when an excavation team was able to breach a masonry wall inside the Hospital de Jesús Nazareno,thanks to the information provided by the discovery of a secret document by historian Lucas Alamán.His bones were put in the charge of the Instituto Nacional de Antropología e Historia (INAH). The remains were authenticated by INAH. The remains of Cortés were then reinterred back to the Hospital de Jesús Nazareno, on 9 July 1947, by President Manuel Ávila Camacho, this time with a bronze inscription and his coat of arms.Following the discovery and authentication of Cortés's remains, there was a discovery of what were described as the bones of Cuauhtémoc, resulting in a "battle of the bones".

On 16 December 1560, the lawsuits related to vassals of the Cortes estate were resolved by a royal order issued by Philip II.

== Legacy and honors ==
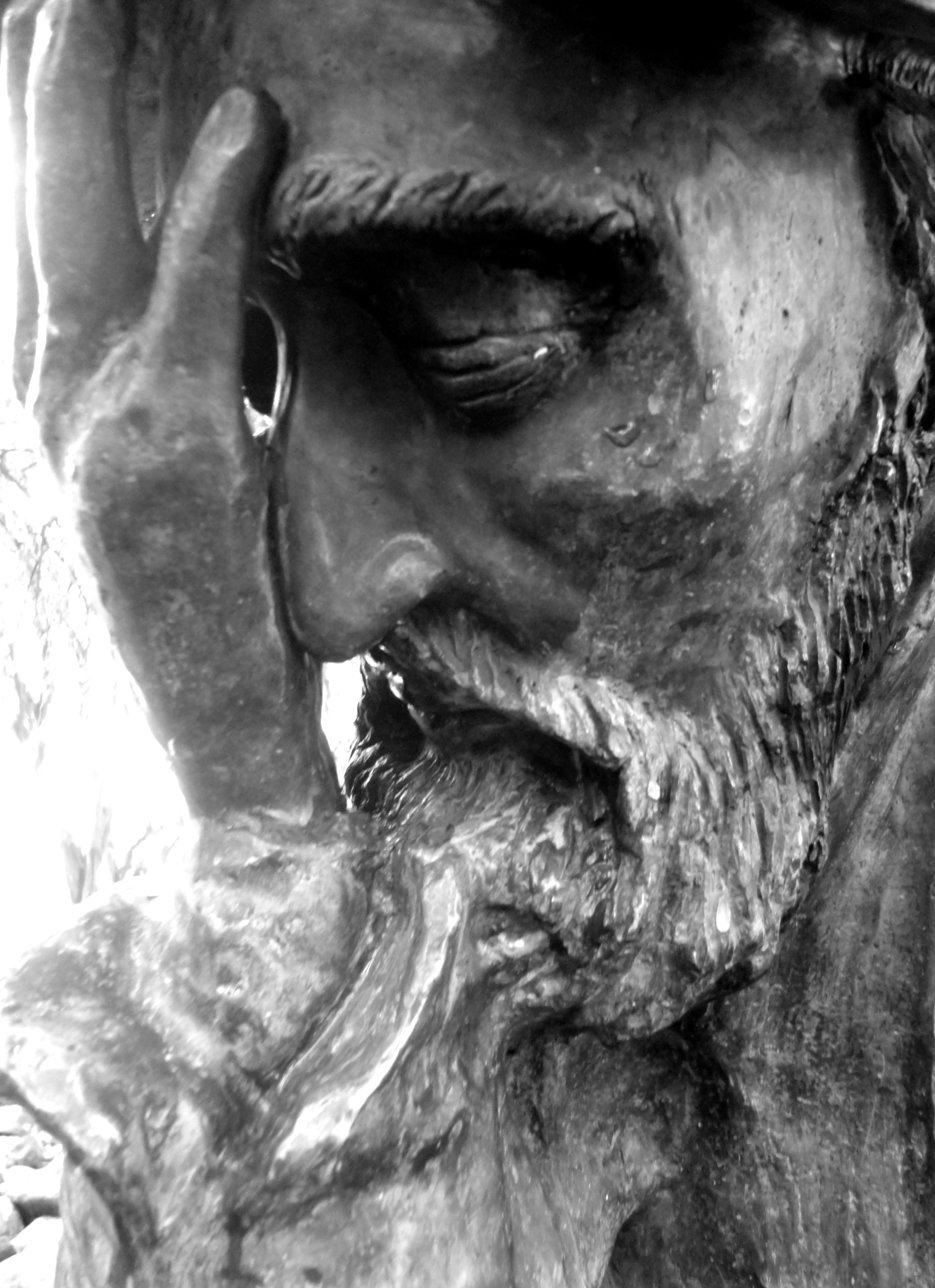
Statue of Hernán Cortés depicted weeping beneath a Montezuma cypress located at Dolores Hidalgo, Guanajuato, Mexico.

There are relatively few sources on the early life of Cortés; his fame arose from his participation in the conquest of Mexico, and it was only after this that people became interested in reading and writing about him.

Probably the best source is his letters to the king, which he wrote during the campaign in Mexico, but they are written with the specific purpose of putting his efforts in a favourable light and so must be read critically. Another main source is the biography written by Cortés's private chaplain Lopez de Gómara, which was written in Spain several years after the conquest. Gómara never set foot in the Americas and knew only what Cortés had told him, and he had an affinity for knightly romantic stories, which he incorporated richly in the biography. The third major source is written as a reaction to what its author calls "the lies of Gomara", the eyewitness account written by the Conquistador Bernal Díaz del Castillo which does not paint Cortés as a romantic hero, but rather tries to emphasize that Cortés's men should also be remembered as important participants in the undertakings in Mexico.

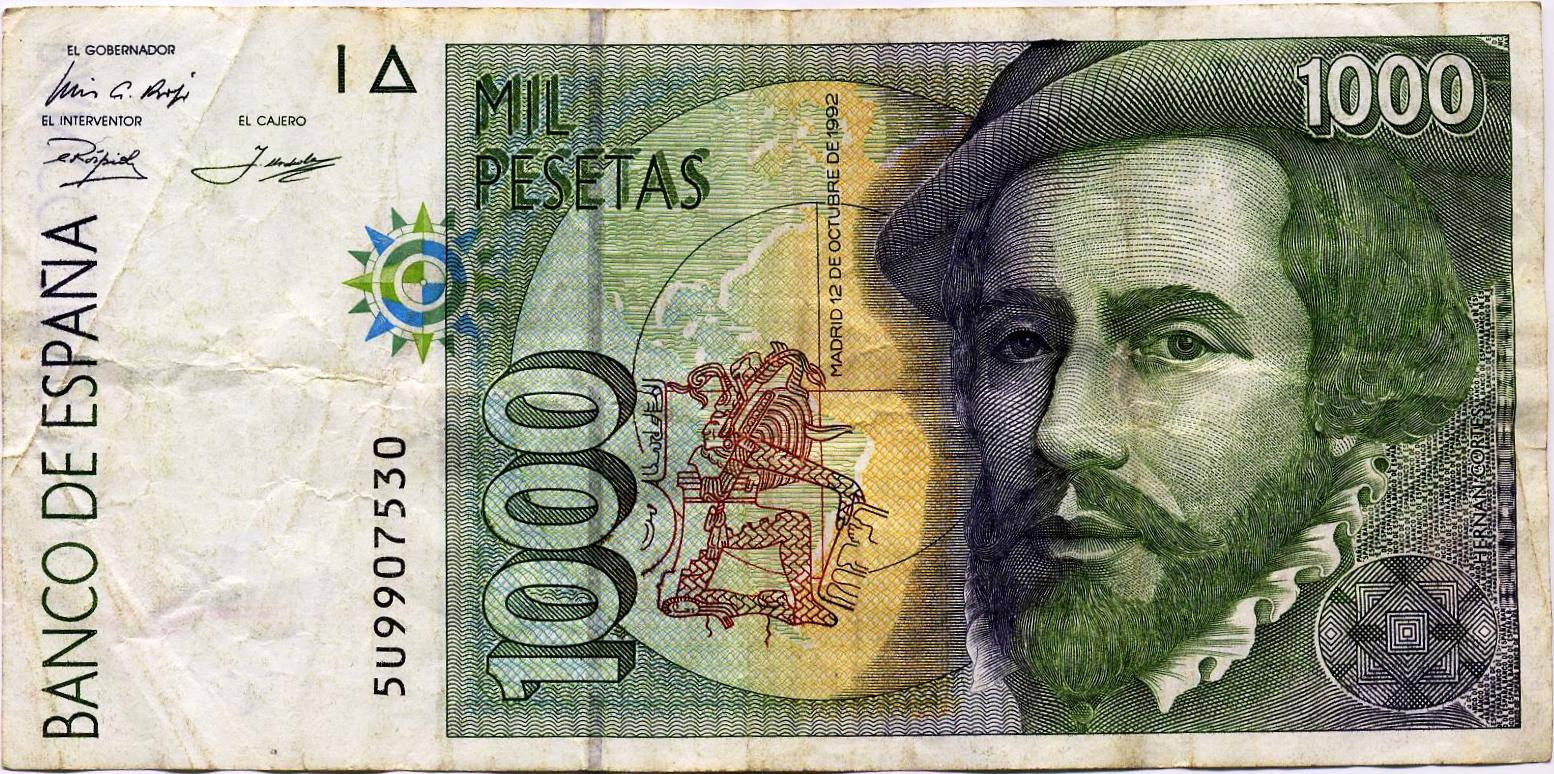
1,000-Spanish-peseta note issued in 1992

In the years following the conquest, more critical accounts of the Spanish arrival in Mexico were written. The Dominican friar Bartolomé de Las Casas wrote his A Short Account of the Destruction of the Indies which raises strong accusations of brutality and heinous violence towards the Indians; accusations against both the conquistadors in general and Cortés in particular. The accounts of the conquest given in the Florentine Codex by the Franciscan Bernardino de Sahagún and his native informants are also less than flattering towards Cortés. The scarcity of these sources has led to a sharp division in the description of Cortés's personality and a tendency to describe him as either a vicious and ruthless person or a noble and honourable cavalier.

=== Taxa named after Cortés ===
Cortés is commemorated in the scientific name of a subspecies of Mexican lizard, Phrynosoma orbiculare cortezii.

=== Representations in Mexico ===
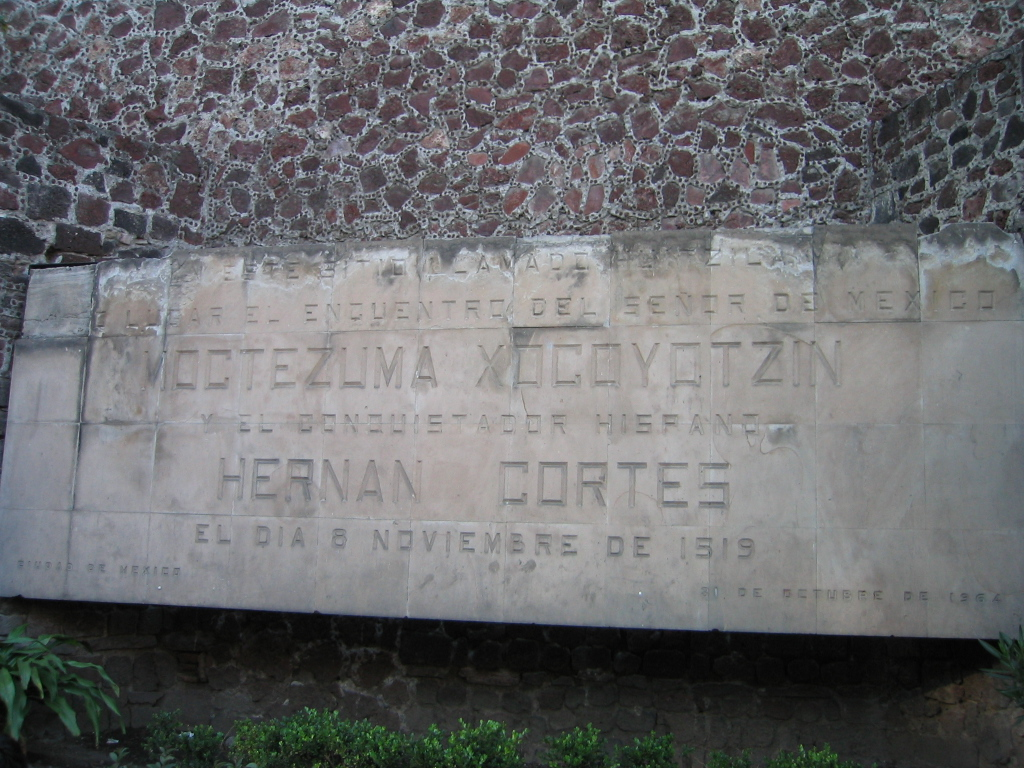
Monument in Mexico City commemorating the encounter of Cortés and Moctezuma at the Hospital de Jesús Nazareno

In México, there are few representations of Cortés. However, many landmarks still bear his name, from the castle Palacio de Cortés in the city of Cuernavaca to some street names throughout the republic.

The pass between the volcanoes Iztaccíhuatl and Popocatépetl, where Cortés took his soldiers on their march to Mexico City, is known as the Paso de Cortés.

The muralist Diego Rivera painted several representations of him, but the most famous one depicts him as a powerful and ominous figure along with Malinche in a mural in the National Palace in Mexico City.

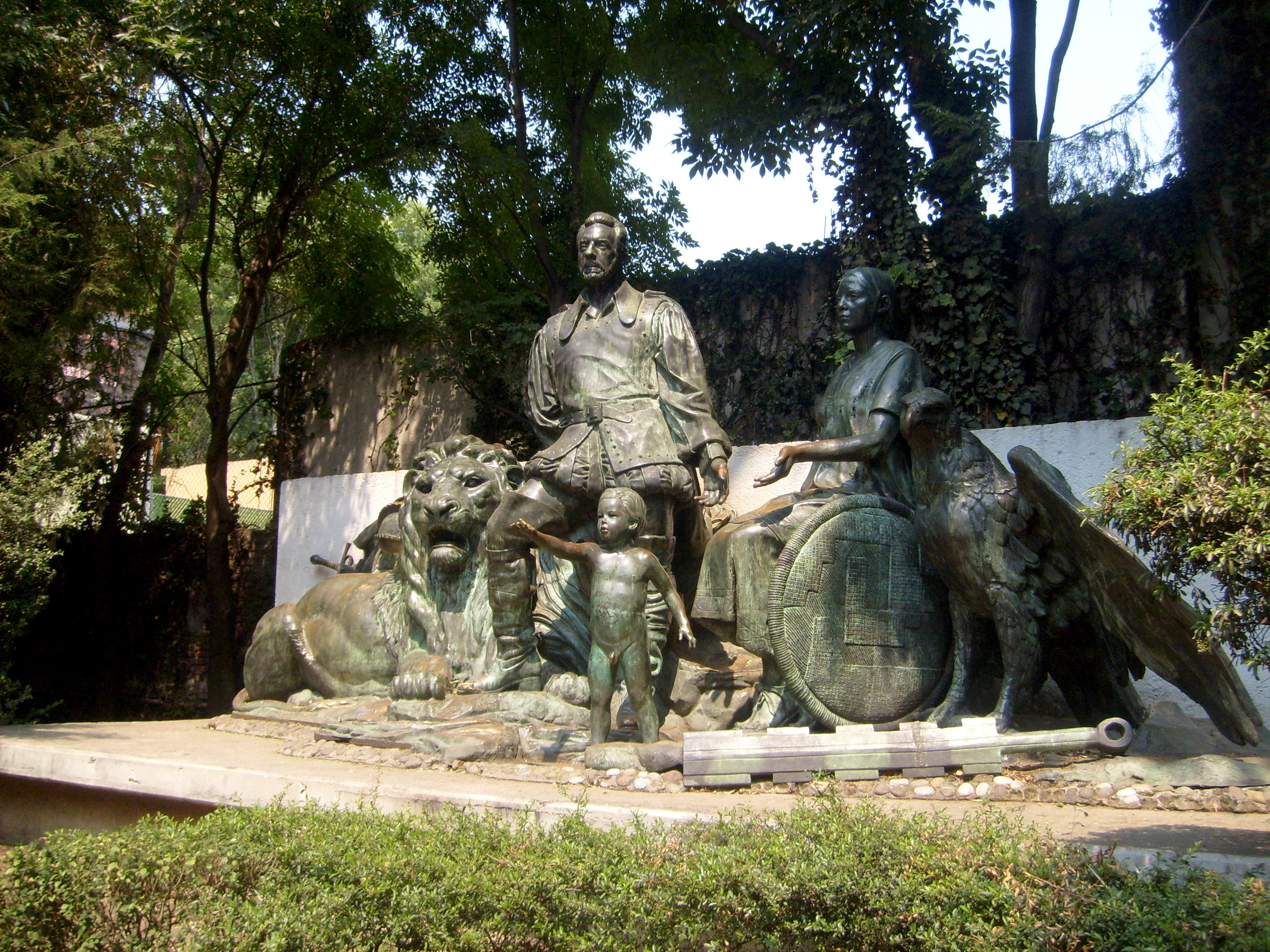
Monument in Mexico City known as "Monumento al Mestizaje"

In 1981, President Lopez Portillo tried to bring Cortés to public recognition. First, he made public a copy of the bust of Cortés made by Manuel Tolsá in the Hospital de Jesús Nazareno with an official ceremony, but soon a nationalist group tried to destroy it, so it had to be taken out of the public. Today the copy of the bust is in the "Hospital de Jesús Nazareno" while the original is in Naples, Italy, in the Villa Pignatelli.

Later, another monument, known as "Monumento al Mestizaje" by Julián Martínez y M. Maldonado (1982), was commissioned by Mexican president José López Portillo to be put in the "Zócalo" (Main square) of Coyoacan, near the place of his country house, but it had to be moved to a little-known park, Jardín Xicoténcatl, Barrio de San Diego Churubusco, to quell protests. The statue depicts Cortés, Malinche and their son Martín.

There is another statue by Sebastián Aparicio, in Cuernavaca, which was in a hotel "El casino de la selva". Cortés is barely recognizable, so it sparked little interest. The hotel was closed to make a commercial centre, and the statue was put out of public display by Costco, the builder of the commercial centre.

=== Cultural depictions ===
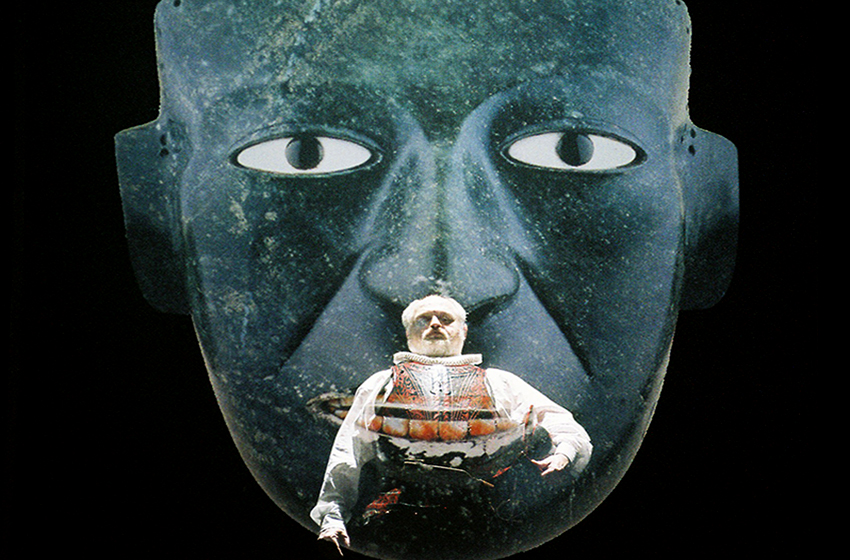
Scene from the opera La Conquista, 2005

Hernán Cortés is a character in the opera La Conquista (2005) by Italian composer Lorenzo Ferrero, which depicts the major episodes of the Spanish conquest of the Aztec Empire in 1521.

=== Writings: the Cartas de Relación ===
Cortés's personal account of the conquest of Mexico is narrated in his five letters addressed to Charles V. These five letters, the cartas de relación, are Cortés's only surviving writings. See "Letters and Dispatches of Cortés", translated by George Folsom (New York, 1843); Prescott's "Conquest of Mexico" (Boston, 1843); and Sir Arthur Helps's "Life of Hernando Cortes" (London, 1871).

His first letter was considered lost, and the one from the municipality of Veracruz has to take its place. It was published for the first time in volume IV of "Documentos para la Historia de España", and subsequently reprinted.

The Segunda Carta de Relacion, bearing the date of 30 October 1520, appeared in print at Seville in 1522. The third letter, dated 15 May 1522, appeared at Seville in 1523. The fourth, 20 October 1524, was printed at Toledo in 1525. The fifth, on the Honduras expedition, is contained in volume IV of the Documentos para la Historia de España.

== Children ==
The children of Don Hernán Cortés born out of wedlock were:

- doña Catalina Pizarro, born between 1514 and 1515 in Santiago de Cuba or maybe later in Nueva España, daughter of an indigenous woman in Cuba, Leonor Pizarro. Doña Catalina married Juan de Salcedo, a conqueror and encomendero, with whom she had a son, Pedro.
- don Martín Cortés, born in Coyoacán in 1522, son of doña Marina (La Malinche), called the First Mestizo; about him was written The New World of Martín Cortés; married doña Bernaldina de Porras and had two children:
  - doña Ana Cortés
  - don Fernando Cortés, Principal Judge of Veracruz. Descendants of this line are alive today in Mexico.
- don Luis Cortés, born in 1525, son of doña Antonia or Elvira Hermosillo, a native of Trujillo (Cáceres)
- doña Leonor Cortés Moctezuma, born in 1527 or 1528 in Ciudad de Mexico, daughter of Aztec princess Tecuichpotzin (baptized Isabel), born in Tenochtitlan on 11 July 1510, and died on 9 July 1550, the eldest legitimate daughter of Moctezuma II Xocoyotzin and wife doña María Miahuaxuchitl; married to Juan de Tolosa, a Basque merchant and miner.
- doña María Cortés de Moctezuma, daughter of an Aztec princess; nothing more is known about her except that she probably was born with some deformity.

Cortés married twice, firstly in Cuba to Catalina Suárez Marcaida, who died at Coyoacán in 1522 without issue, and secondly in 1529 to doña Juana Ramírez de Arellano de Zúñiga, daughter of don Carlos Ramírez de Arellano, 2nd Count of Aguilar, and his wife, the Countess doña Juana de Zúñiga. The children of Cortés and doña Juana Ramírez de Arellano de Zúñiga were:

- don Luis Cortés y Ramírez de Arellano, born in Texcoco in 1530 and died shortly after his birth.
- doña Catalina Cortés de Zúñiga, born in Cuernavaca in 1531 and died shortly after her birth.
- don Martín Cortés y Ramírez de Arellano, 2nd Marquess of the Valley of Oaxaca, born in Cuernavaca in 1532, married at Nalda on 24 February 1548, his twice cousin once removed doña Ana Ramírez de Arellano y Ramírez de Arellano and had issue, currently extinct in male line
- doña María Cortés de Zúñiga, born in Cuernavaca between 1533 and 1536, married to don Luis de Quiñones y Pimentel, 5th Count of Luna
- doña Catalina Cortés de Zúñiga, born in Cuernavaca between 1533 and 1536, died unmarried in Sevilla after the funeral of her father
- doña Juana Cortés de Zúñiga, born in Cuernavaca between 1533 and 1536, married Don Fernando Enríquez de Ribera y Portocarrero, 2nd Duke of Alcalá de los Gazules, 3rd Marquess of Tarifa and 6th Count of Los Molares, and had issue

== In literature and the arts ==
- Hernán Cortés (called by the Italian form of his name, "Fernando") is the hero of Antonio Vivaldi's 1733 opera Motezuma.
- In his 1816 poem "On First Looking into Chapman's Homer," John Keats erroneously describes Cortés as the discoverer of the Pacific Ocean, instead of Vasco Núñez de Balboa: "Or like stout Cortez when with eagle eyes / He stared at the Pacific".
- Cortés features as an antagonist in the 1980 novel Aztec by Gary Jennings.
- Cortés was portrayed (as "Hernando Cortez") by actor Cesar Romero in the 1947 historical adventure film Captain from Castile.
- "Cortez the Killer", a 1975 song by Neil Young.
- Appears as a special unit for the Spanish Empire in Civilization VII.
- Cortés, voiced by Jim Cummings, is a villainous character in The Road to El Dorado (2000), an animated feature set against the Spanish invasion of Mexico.

== See also ==
- History of Spain
- History of Mexico
- History of Mexico City
- Age of Discovery
- New Spain
- Palace of Cortés, Cuernavaca
- Spanish conquest of the Aztec Empire
- Spanish conquest of the Inca Empire
