= Alonso de Maldonado =

Spanish colonial administrator

Governor of Guatemala and Honduras President of the Audiencia of Guatemala
- In office 1542–1548
- Preceded by: Francisco de la Cueva & Francisco Marroquín
- Succeeded by: Alonso López de Cerrato

Governor of Guatemala
- In office 1536 – 15 September 1539
- Preceded by: Pedro de Alvarado
- Succeeded by: Pedro de Alvarado

Judge of the Real Audiencia of Mexico
- In office 10 January 1531 – 16 April 1535
- Preceded by: Nuño de Guzmán of the first Audiencia
- Succeeded by: Antonio de Mendoza, Viceroy of New Spain

Personal details
- Born: 1480 Salamanca, Castile
- Died: Unknown
- Spouse(s): Juana de Ortega; Elena de Torres y Medinilla
- Occupation: Judge, bureaucrat

Alonso de Maldonado Diez de Ledesma (1480 Salamanca, Spain), was a Spanish lawyer and a member of the second Real Audiencia of Mexico, which governed New Spain from January 10, 1531 to April 16, 1535. He was also president of the first Real Audiencia of Guatemala, and in that capacity interim governor of Guatemala from 1536 to September 15, 1539. He was governor of Guatemala a second time, from 1542 to 1548.

== Early life ==
Alonso de Maldonado Diez de Ledesma was the son of Francisco Arias Maldonado and Guiomar Diez de Ledesma. Alonso married as his first wife, Juana de Ortega. Four children were born from this marriage, Luisa, Guiomar, Marina and Juana. His second marriage was to Elena de Torres y Medinilla who was the daughter of Luis de Torres and Barbola de Medinilla. There were two children born of this marriage, Alonso Maldonado de Torres and Diego Maldonado de Torres.

== The Second Audiencia of Mexico ==
After the criminal disaster of the first Real Audiencia of Mexico, Emperor Charles V carefully chose five upstanding men to replace them, as the second Audiencia. The second Audiencia was named in a royal decree dated January 12, 1530. It was made up of Bishop Sebastián Ramírez de Fuenleal as president, and Juan de Salmerón, Francisco Ceinos, Maldonado and Vasco de Quiroga as oidores (judges). All of these men were honest, honorable and capable. All were licentiates.

The second Audiencia improved the road from Veracruz to Mexico City, and along the way founded the city of Puebla de los Angeles as a resting-place for travelers (April 16, 1531). It imported horses and cattle from Spain, took steps to import a printing press, founded the Imperial College of Santiago Tlatelolco for higher learning for young indigenous men, renewed exploration, and continued work on the cathedral of Mexico City. Enslavement of Indians was prohibited in 1532. The second Audiencia brought suit against the oidores of the first Audiencia Nuño Beltrán de Guzmán, Juan Ortiz de Matienzo and Diego Delgadillo. Beltrán de Guzmán was absent from the capital, but the other two corrupt officials were sent back to Spain as prisoners.

== First term as governor of Guatemala ==
In 1535, Pedro de Alvarado, previous governor of Guatemala, returned in defeat from Peru. Not only was his expedition a failure, but upon his return he was faced with a trial over his reckless adventure without royal approval, and for taking Guatemalan Indians with him, many of whom died on the expedition. On October 27, 1535 the Audiencia of Mexico, which had loose jurisdiction over Guatemala, dismissed him from the governorship of the province and sent Alonso de Maldonado as provisional governor and juez de residencia ("judge of grievances") to look into his conduct. Alvarado had many enemies in Guatemala, and there were many grievances against him. To avoid a trial, he fled to Honduras to fight rebellious Indians, and later to Spain.

Maldonado brought with him a reputation for honesty and justice, for the Indigenous as well as the Spaniards, and he preserved this reputation during his government of Guatemala.

In 1537 Maldonado granted Fray Bartolomé de las Casas jurisdiction over the territory of Tezulutlán, or Land of War, in Guatemala. Maldonado agreed to the exclusion of other Spaniards from the region for five years. Las Casas was a Dominican, and the Dominicans peacefully converted the Indigenous population. The area was renamed Vera Paz, or True Peace.

In 1539 Alvarado returned from Spain, bringing with him royal privileges and concessions granting immunity from the threatened trial and replacing Maldonado as governor. Alvarado was named governor of Guatemala for seven years, and also governor of neighboring Honduras, a position he had not held previously. His contacts in the Spanish Court, coupled with his diplomatic skill, had returned control of the government to him. After spending five months in Honduras, he entered Santiago de los Caballeros (Antigua Guatemala) on September 15, 1539, replacing Maldonado. Maldonado was forced to return to Mexico.

While in Spain, Alvarado had married Beatriz de la Cueva sister of his previous wife and, like her, a niece of Francisco de los Cobos, secretary to the emperor. Also arriving with Alvarado was a group of single women seeking husbands among the colonists and conquistadors of Santiago.

== Second term as governor of Guatemala ==
Pedro de Alvarado died in 1541, and his widow Beatriz was elected governor of Guatemala. However she soon died as well, and in 1542 her brother Francisco de la Cueva and Bishop Francisco Marroquín (1499–1563) were elected co-governors. Bartolomé de las Casas had recommended that Maldonado be appointed president of the new Audiencia of the Confines (Guatemala), and New Spain Viceroy Antonio de Mendoza made him governor of Guatemala and Honduras later in 1542. A group of conquistadors in Honduras insisted that it be governed separately, but they were forced to accept Maldonado.

In 1542 the New Laws of Emperor Charles V were to enter into force in the Spanish dominions in the New World. These were intended to alleviate the plight of the indigenous, but there was strong opposition to them among the Spanish holders of encomiendas. Maldonado did not enforce them in Guatemala. The New Laws were inspired largely by Las Casas, and because of Maldonado's noncooperation, Las Casas secured his replacement as governor by Alonso López de Cerrato in 1548.

In 1547 he traveled to Nicaragua to recruit soldiers for the army.

== See also ==
- List of Viceroys of New Spain
