= Juan de Salmerón =

Spanish colonial administrator

Judge of the Real Audiencia of Mexico
- In office 10 January 1531 – 16 April 1535
- Preceded by: Nuño de Guzmán of the first Audiencia
- Succeeded by: Antonio de Mendoza, Viceroy of New Spain

Personal details
- Occupation: Judge, bureaucrat

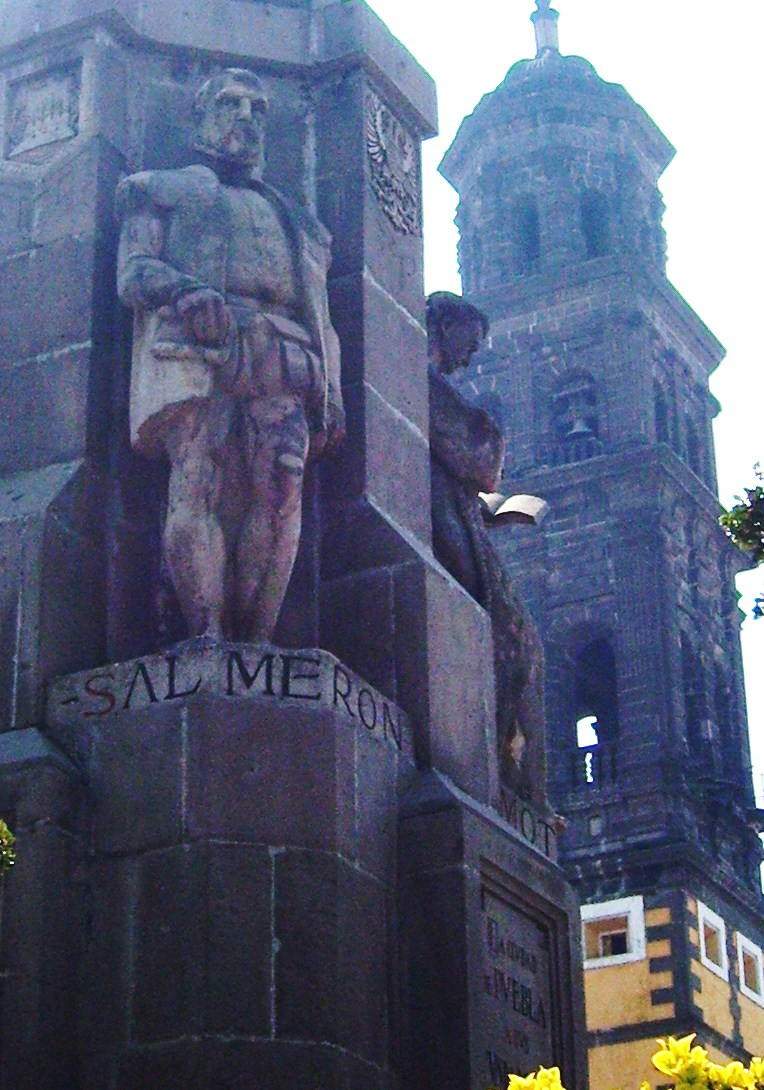
Statue of Juan de Salmerón

Juan de Salmerón was a Spanish colonial official New Spain, and an oidor (judge) of the second Real Audiencia of Mexico, which governed the colony from January 10, 1531 until April 16, 1534. On the latter date, the government was turned over to Antonio de Mendoza, the first Viceroy of New Spain. Along with Fray Toribio de Benavente Motolinia he built the first European settlement at Puebla, Puebla.

Before arriving in the New World, Salmerón earned a doctor of law degree and was counselor to Emperor Charles V. Later he was alcalde of Castilla de Oro, in Central America.

After the criminal disaster of the first Real Audiencia of Mexico, Charles V carefully chose five upstanding men to replace them, as the second Audiencia. The second Audiencia was named in a royal decree dated January 12, 1530. It was made up of Bishop Sebastián Ramírez de Fuenleal as president, and Salmerón, Francisco Ceinos, Alonso de Maldonado and Vasco de Quiroga as oidores. All of these men were honest, honorable and capable. All were licentiates.

Bishop Sebastián Ramírez de Fuenleal was in Santo Domingo at the time, but the other members of the Audiencia were in Spain. They sailed from Seville on September 16, 1530 and arrived in the port of Veracruz in the early part of 1531.

The second Audiencia improved the road from Veracruz to Mexico City, and along the way founded the city of Puebla de los Angeles as a resting-place for travelers (April 16, 1531). It imported horses and cattle from Spain, took steps to import a printing press, founded the Imperial College of Santiago Tlatelolco for higher learning for young indigenous men, renewed exploration, and continued work on the cathedral of Mexico City. Enslavement of Indians was prohibited in 1532. The Second Audiencia brought suit against the oidores of the First Audiencia Nuño Beltrán de Guzmán, Juan Ortiz de Matienzo and Diego Delgadillo. Beltrán de Guzmán was absent from the capital, but the other two corrupt officials were sent back to Spain as prisoners.

When Ramírez de Fuenleal decided to found the city of Puebla as a resting place for travelers between Veracruz and Mexico City, Fray Toribio and Oidor Salmerón were chosen commissioners for the task. Together with a large number of Indian laborers, they built the city. Fray Toribio said the first Catholic Mass there, on 16 April 1531.

Salmerón was also involved in the repartimientos de tierras (divisions of lands) in the Valley of Atlixco surrounding Puebla. The first repartimiento occurred on December 5, 1532, to 34 Spanish settlers. Salmerón made the division, in the presence of and with the consent of indigenous chiefs (Don Pedro, Señor of Huejotzingo, Don Juan, governor of the same place, Don Pedro, Señor of Calpan and Atlixco, and "many other señors and principals of the named pueblos"). Witnesses included Fray Jacobo de Testera, of the convent of Huejotzingo, Notary Public Francisco de Orduña and Fray Diego de la Cruz of Cholula.

In August 1531, Lic. Salmerón solicited special privileges for the new settlement of Puebla. The Spanish Crown granted it the name "Puebla de Los Angeles", and also granted the settlers an exemption from personal and business taxes for 30 years. These privileges were granted in a royal decree dated March 20, 1532.

== See also ==
- List of Viceroys of New Spain
