= Juan Ortiz de Matienzo =

Spanish colonial administrator

Member of the Real Audiencia of Mexico
- In office 9 December 1528 – 9 January 1531 Serving with Nuño de Guzmán and Diego Delgadillo
- Preceded by: Alonso de Estrada & Luis de la Torre as Governor of New Spain
- Succeeded by: Sebastián Ramírez de Fuenleal of the second Audiencia

Member of the Real Audiencia of Santo Domingo

Personal details
- Occupation: Judge, bureaucrat

Juan Ortiz de Matienzo was a Spanish colonial judge and an original member of the first Real Audiencia of Santo Domingo, in 1512. From December 9, 1528 until January 9, 1531, he was a member of the first Real Audiencia of Mexico, which took over the governance of New Spain from the conquistadors.

== The Audiencia of Santo Domingo ==
The first Real Audiencia dates from 1371 in Valladolid, Castile. It served as a court of appeals. In the 1490s several other audiencias were set up in metropolitan Spain. The first such court in the Spanish Empire outside of Spain was established October 15, 1511 in Santo Domingo, in what is now the Dominican Republic.

The first oidores (judges) of the Audiencia of Santo Domingo were Marcelo de Villalobos, Ortiz de Matienzo and Lucas Vázquez de Ayllón. Ortiz was related to two other high-ranking officials in Santo Domingo. His uncle Sancho de Matienzo was treasurer of the Casa de Contratación, and his cousin Domingo de Ochandiano was in charge of the accounting office and served as temporary treasurer.

The Audiencia's initial, geographically restricted jurisdiction was extended in 1528 to other Spanish possessions in the New World, including New Spain.

The Audiencia of Santo Domingo was very corrupt. Ayllón, Villalobos and Ortiz were apparently the objects of a juicio de residencia (grievance) proceeding in 1516, which exposed extraordinary corruption within the oligarchy that ruled the island.

== The first Audiencia of Mexico City ==
After the conquest of New Spain by Hernán Cortés, the colony had been governed by a military government, often violent, arbitrary and exploitative of the Indigenous. Hoping to establish a more orderly and just government (and perhaps also to reduce the authority of Cortés), on December 13, 1527 the metropolitan government of Charles V in Burgos named a Real Audiencia to take over the government of New Spain. This consisted of a president and four oidores (judges). The president was Nuño Beltrán de Guzmán and the oidores were Ortiz de Matienzo, Diego Delgadillo, Diego Maldonado and Alonso de Parada.

At the time Beltrán de Guzmán was already in New Spain, at Pánuco, so Charles ordered the judges to assemble in Veracruz and from there make a joint entrance into the capital. However, Beltrán de Guzmán was delayed. The oidores from Spain did not wait for his arrival, but proceeded directly to the capital. They arrived there on December 8, 1528, taking over the government on the following day. They were given a splendid reception by the city government. Beltrán arrived a little after the others. Two of them, Maldonado and Parada, were sick on their arrival and soon died. They did not take part in the government.

The Audiencia had instructions to improve the treatment of the Indigenous and to conclude the impeachment investigations of Cortés and his associates Pedro de Alvarado, Alonso de Estrada, Rodrigo de Albornoz, Gonzalo de Salazar and Pedro Almíndez Chirino within 90 days. Most of these associates had participated in the government in the proceeding few years while Cortés was in Honduras or Spain, with a lot of in-fighting among themselves and injustices to the population, both Indigenous and Spanish.

Cortés himself was still in Spain, where he was defending his conduct and appealing to Charles concerning his loss of authority. Cortés had some success with his appeal, being named Marqués del Valle de Oaxaca and receiving some other honors.

== Government of the first Audiencia ==
This Audiencia was very corrupt, and Ortiz de Matienzo participated in the corruption.

Beltrán de Guzmán, president of the Audiencia, left the capital on an expedition to conquer western Mexico on December 21, 1529, leaving Ortiz in charge.

The Audiencia banned direct communication with the Court in Spain. This was so effective that Bishop Juan de Zumárraga, who also held the royal office of Protector of the Indians, felt the necessity of hiding a letter sealed in wax in a cask, to be smuggled to the Spanish authorities by a confederate sailor.

The maladministration of the first Audiencia continued until the return of Cortés in July 1530. The members of the Audiencia intended to depose Cortés, but were prevented by the actions of Bishop Zumárraga. Shortly thereafter, the members of the second Audiencia arrived, taking power in January 1531. The second Audiencia was much different from the first, honest, capable and dedicated to good government and fair treatment of the Indigenous.

== Consequences ==
The members of the first Audiencia were called to answer before other courts. Once again Ortiz was subject to a residencia suit. In all, one hundred and twenty-five lawsuits were begun against the oidores. In one of the suits, Cortés accused Beltrán de Guzmán, Ortiz and Delgadillo of attempting to usurp his property and powers in New Spain during his absence in Spain in 1528. They were sentenced to lose all their repartimientos and to pay large fines.
