= Diego Delgadillo =

Spanish colonial administrator in Mexico (died 1533)

Member of the Real Audiencia of Mexico
- In office 9 December 1528 – 9 January 1531 Serving with Nuño de Guzmán and Juan Ortiz de Matienzo
- Preceded by: Alonso de Estrada & Luis de la Torre as Governor of New Spain
- Succeeded by: Sebastián Ramírez de Fuenleal of the second Audiencia

Personal details
- Born: Granada, Castile
- Died: 1533 Granada, Castile
- Education: University of Alcalá
- Occupation: Judge, bureaucrat

Diego Delgadillo (b. Granada, Spain, d. 1533, Granada) was a judge of the first Real Audiencia of Mexico, which took control of the governance of New Spain from the conquistadors from December 9, 1528 to January 9, 1531.

Delgadillo was a native of Granada. He graduated as a lawyer from the University of Alcalá.

== The first Audiencia ==
Ever since the conquest by Hernán Cortés, New Spain had been governed by a military government, generally violent, arbitrary and exploitative of the Indigenous. Hoping to establish a more orderly and just government (and perhaps also to reduce the authority of Cortés), on December 13, 1527 the metropolitan government of Charles V in Burgos named a Real (royal) Audiencia to take over the government of the colony. This consisted of a president and four oidores (judges). The president was Nuño Beltrán de Guzmán and the oidores were Juan Ortiz de Matienzo, Delgadillo, Diego Maldonado and Alonso de Parada. They left Spain for the Indies in August 1528. Maldonado and Parada became ill from the voyage and died soon after.

At the time Beltrán de Guzmán was already in New Spain, at Pánuco, so Charles ordered the judges to assemble in Veracruz and from there make a joint entrance into the capital. However, Beltrán de Guzmán was delayed. The oidores from Spain did not wait for his arrival, but proceeded directly to the capital. They arrived there on December 8, 1528, taking over the government on the following day. They were given a splendid reception by the city government. Beltrán arrived a little after the others. Two of them (Maldonado and Parada) were sick on their arrival and soon died. They did not take part in the government.

The Audiencia was instructed to improve the treatment of the Indigenous and to conclude the juicios de residencia into the conduct of Cortés and his associates Pedro de Alvarado, Alonso de Estrada, Rodrigo de Albornoz, Gonzalo de Salazar and Pedro Almíndez Chirino within 90 days. Most of these associates had participated in the government in the proceeding few years while Cortés was in Honduras or Spain, with a lot of in-fighting among themselves and injustices to the population, both Indigenous and Spanish.

Cortés himself was still in Spain, where he was defending his conduct and appealing to Charles concerning his loss of authority. Cortés had some success with his appeal, being named Marqués del Valle de Oaxaca and receiving some other honors.

== Government of the first Audiencia ==
This Audiencia was very corrupt, and Delgadillo participated in the corruption, accumulating a large sum of money. He received a grant of land from the municipal council, which was illegal for the judges, and he had his brother appointed governor of the Zapoteca province. He soon entered into open opposition to Cortés, the bishops and the missionaries.

The Audiencia banned direct communication with the Court in Spain. This was so effective that Bishop Juan de Zumárraga felt the necessity of hiding a letter sealed in wax in a cask, to be smuggled to the Spanish authorities by a confederate sailor.

Delgadillo founded the Spanish settlement of Antequera (now Oaxaca) and suppressed a revolt of the Indigenous nearby. He imported the mulberry tree and the silkworm into the colony in 1530, becoming the first to begin sericulture in the New World. He imported the olive tree the following year.

The maladministration of the first Audiencia continued until the return of Cortés in July 1530. The members of the Audiencia intended to depose Cortés, but were prevented by the actions of Bishop Zumárraga. Shortly thereafter, the members of the second Audiencia arrived, taking power in January 1531. The second Audiencia was much different from the first, honest, capable and dedicated to good government and fair treatment of the Indigenous.

== Consequences ==
The members of the first Audiencia were called to answer before other courts. One hundred twenty-five lawsuits were begun. In one of the suits, Cortés accused Beltrán de Guzmán, Ortiz de Matienzo and Delgadillo of attempting to usurp his property and powers in New Spain during his absence in Spain in 1528. Delgadillo, like the others, was sentenced to lose all his repartimientos and to pay a large fine.

Thereafter Delgadillo returned to Spain, retiring to his native City. There a severe illness brought about by his troubles caused his death.
