= Vasco de Quiroga =

Venerated Spanish bishop and colonial administrator

Venerable Vasco de Quiroga
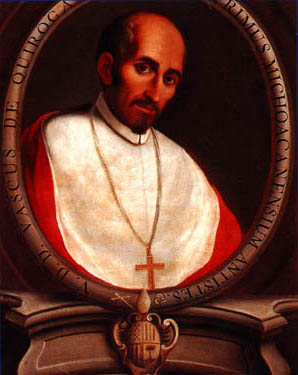
- Vasco de Quiroga, member of the second Audiencia and first bishop of Michoacán
- Born: Vasco de Quiroga; 1470 or '78; Madrigal de las Altas Torres, Ávila, Spain
- Died: 14 March 1565 (aged 86–94); Pátzcuaro, Michoacán, Mexico
- Burial place: Basílica de Nuestra Señora de la Salud, Pátzcuaro, Michoacán, Mexico
- Education: University of Salamanca
- Occupations: Bishop, judge, bureaucrat
- Title: Bishop of Michoacán
- Church: Roman Catholic Church
- Archdiocese: Michoacán
- See: Michoacán
- Appointed: 18 August 1536
- Installed: January 1539
- Term ended: 14 March 1565
- Predecessor: None
- Successor: Antonio Ruíz de Morales y Molina, O.S.

Orders
- Consecration: 5 January 1539 by Fray Juan de Zumárraga, O.F.M.
- Rank: Bishop

Sainthood
- Feast day: 14 March
- Venerated in: Roman Catholic Church
- Title as Saint: Venerable

Judge of the Real Audiencia of Mexico
- In office 10 January 1531 – 16 April 1535
- President: Sebastián Ramírez de Fuenleal
- Preceded by: Nuño de Guzmán of the first Audiencia
- Succeeded by: Antonio de Mendoza, Viceroy of New Spain

Vasco de Quiroga (1470/78 – 14 March 1565) was the first bishop of Michoacán, Mexico, and one of the judges (oidores) in the second Real Audiencia of Mexico – the high court that governed New Spain – from January 10, 1531, to April 16, 1535.

Coming from a background as a lawyer and a judge he was appointed to be a judge in the second Audiencia after the first Audiencia's failure. As an oidor he took a strong interest in restoring order to the Michoacán area which had been ravaged by rebellions and unrest. He employed a strategy of congregating indigenous populations into congregated Hospital-towns called Republicas de Indios, organized after principles derived from Thomas More's Utopia. The purpose of this policy was to teach the Indians a trade and to instruct them in Christian values and lifestyles. He established multiple such hospitals: Santa Fé de México close to the town of Tacubaya in the Valley of Mexico, and Santa Fé de la Laguna close to Pátzcuaro, Michoacán, and Santa Fe Del Rio close to La Piedad, Michoacán.

Because of his contribution to the protection of the Indians, Vasco de Quiroga's legacy is recognized in America and Spain, and even venerated in the Catholic Church.

== Background and life in Europe ==
Vasco de Quiroga was born into a noble family in Madrigal de las Altas Torres, Castile. His family was of Galician origin. His brother Álvaro became the father of Gaspar de Quiroga y Vela, later cardinal of Toledo. Traditionally his birth year has been given as 1470, because of a tradition that he was 95 at his year of death. Recent biographers prefer the later date around 1478, because of evidence from Quiroga's own hand that he was 60 in 1538.

Quiroga studied law and later theology. He studied canon law, probably in Valladolid, or at Salamanca ca. 1520. He worked as a letrado – a royal jurist in southern Spain and as a judge in Oran in Algeria from ca. 1520 - 1526. After returning from Africa, he stayed a while with the royal court, where documents have him in 1528. He certainly had powerful connections such as a friendship with Juan Bernal Díaz de Luco who was a member of the Council of the Indies, and with the cardinal of Toledo Juan Tavera. This was probably the reason that he was offered a position as oidor (judge) in the second Audiencia of New Spain when the Council of Indies had to dismiss the first in 1530. The president of this second Audiencia was Bishop Sebastián Ramírez de Fuenleal, and the other members were Quiroga, Juan de Salmerón, Alonso de Maldonado and Francisco Ceinos. They began governing in Mexico City in 1531.

== As a member of the Audiencia ==
Quiroga founded the hospital-pueblo of Santa Fe (Mexico City), with his own money. This was his first attempt at building a Utopia on the model of Sir Thomas More. He converted many Indigenous to Christianity. He sat on the tribunal that ordered the president of the first Audiencia, Nuño Beltrán de Guzmán, to be returned to Spain in chains. Quiroga and the other oidores of the second Audiencia also conducted the trial of Juan Ortiz de Matienzo and Diego Delgadillo, oídores of the first Audiencia.

When the newly conquered Chichimec Indians of Michoacán rebelled in 1533, Quiroga was sent to that province as visitador (inspector). While an oídor Vasco de Quiroga became influenced by Thomas More's recently published Utopia (1516), he probably read the copy belonging to Bishop Juan de Zumárraga, now held at the library of the University of Texas at Austin.

In 1535 the second Audiencia turned over its governing powers to the first viceroy of New Spain, Antonio de Mendoza.

== Información en Derecho ==
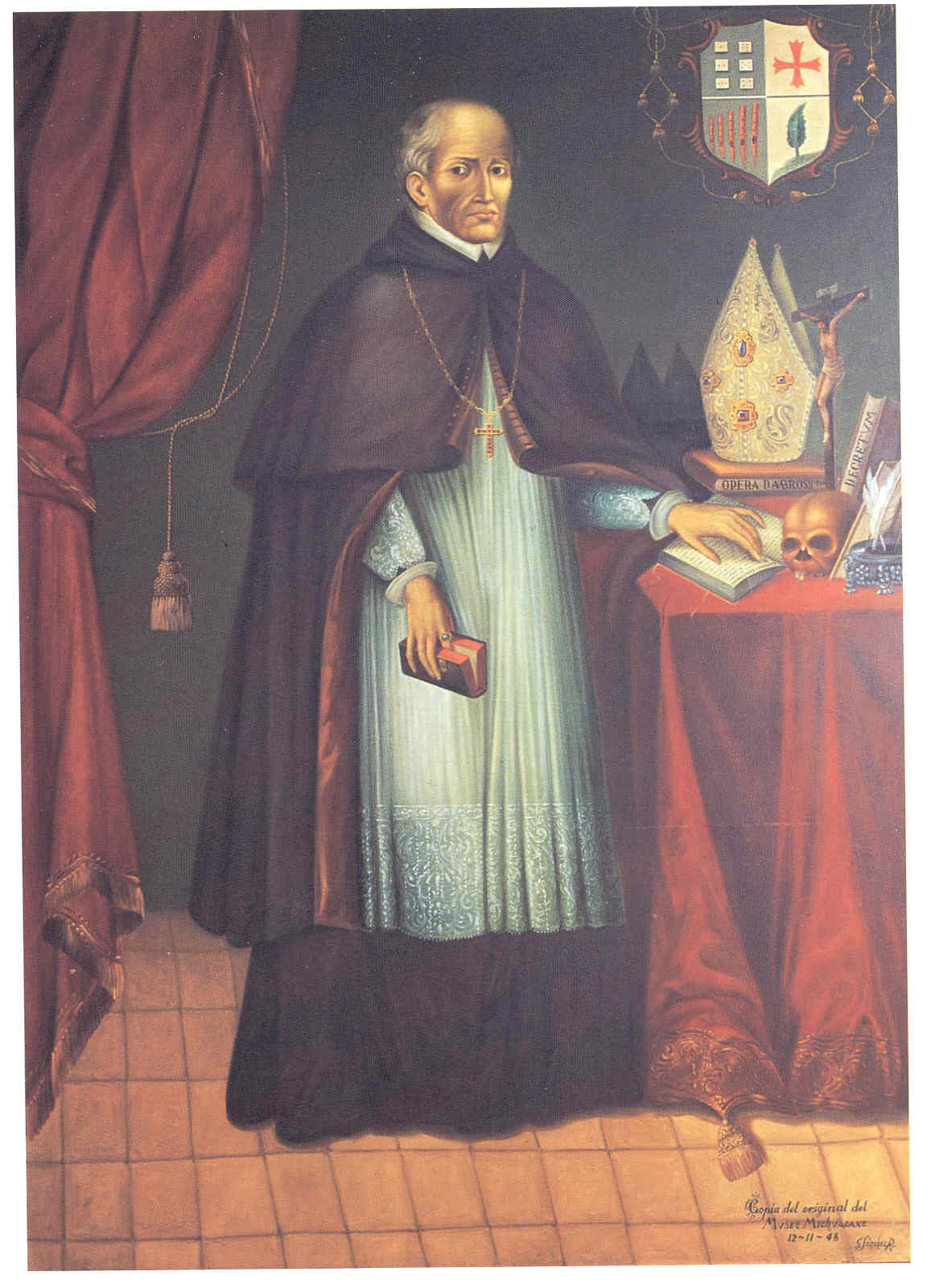
Vasco de Quiroga (ca. 1470–1565)

"Información en Derecho" is the lengthiest piece of writing from Vasco de Quiroga's hand that we have knowledge about; it is dated México July 1535. It was partly a response to the Crown's reversal of a previous prohibition of the enslavement of the native population. It contains a detailed analysis of the legal and ethical issues concerning slavery in the Americas and includes a recommendation of a new policy towards the Indians based on the model laid out in Thomas More's Utopia.

Since 1530 the second audiencia had worked in accordance with a royal decree of 1530 forbidding all further enslavement of Indians, which had previously been allowed only during warfare or by buying Indians that were already slaves. In 1534 the Crown responded to appeals by colonists who argued that they needed slave labor to continue to make profits by repealing this law and legalizing a limited form of slavery once again. The argument put forth was that Indians were recently becoming unruly, that there were no longer any causes for "Just War", and that already enslaved Indians would benefit from having Christian masters rather than Indian ones.

In Información en Derecho the lawyer Vasco de Quiroga undertook a complex legal argument refuting the reasoning behind this royal decree. The letter was probably directed to his friend Bernal Diaz de Luco, member of the Council of Indies. He argued that Indians did not have slavery in the European sense and that therefore there was no class of already enslaved Indians that could be bought by Spaniards, and that allowing this was therefore unjust.

He argued that the right way to avoid problems with unruly natives was to gather them into congregations where they would be able to be better controlled and administered, and indoctrinated into the Christian faith and a Spanish way of life. He proposed that this system of congregations should be based on the organizational principles laid out in Thomas More's Utopia.

As in More's Utopia the basic social unit would be the family headed by the "padre de familia" corresponding to More's "paterfamilias". Every thirty families would be overseen by a "jurado" corresponding to More's office of "syphogrant". Above every ten jurados would be a regidor, corresponding to More's office of "tranibore" or "philarch". On the top of the hierarchy there would be two alcaldes ordinarios and a "tacatecle" corresponding to the Utopian prince. All of these offices were to be held by natives. The highest office of the city—that of "corregidor"—would be held by a Spaniard, appointed by the Audiencia.

Accompanying the información en derecho, Quiroga also sent his own Spanish translation of More's Utopia (written in Latin), but this document has been lost.

== As bishop of Michoacán ==
In 1536, Quiroga was appointed the first bishop of the newly established diocese of Michoacán. He was nominated by the president of the Second Audiencia, bishop of Santo Domingo, Sebastián Ramírez Fuenleal, after the first candidate Fray Luis de Fuensalida had declined the honor. The emperor and the pope approved the nomination and in 1537 the appointment was made official; in 1538 he took office. He remained in Michoacán as pastor and protector of the Indians for most of the remainder of his life.

As bishop, he transferred the seat of the bishopric from Tzintzuntzán to Pátzcuaro. In Pátzcuaro he founded the cathedral and the Seminary of San Nicolas. He worked to gather the Indians in large towns near Lake Pátzcuaro in the center of Purépecha territory, recently ravaged by Beltrán de Guzmán. Using Thomas More's Utopia as a model, here the Indians were to be taught religion, crafts and the fundamentals of self-government. Each town was to become the center of an industry. Each person worked six hours a day and contributed on an equal basis to the common welfare. He gradually realized the necessity of restricting the scope of his plans, which he had hoped to apply throughout the colony, to the smaller area over which he had jurisdiction, partially because his personal funds were not unlimited.

Quiroga's efforts were very successful, and he was said to be greatly beloved by the members of his flock. He was known to them as Tata Vasco (Father Vasco).

Charles V had prohibited the enslavement of conquered subjects, but in 1534 he revoked that prohibition, at least insofar as to allow slavery of natives captured in a "just war." When Quiroga became aware of this, he wrote to Charles his celebrated Información en derecho (1535), in which he strongly condemned the encomenderos, saying that they did not accept the natives as men, but only as beasts.

In 1545 Quiroga left for Spain to attend the Council of Trent, but his ship was damaged and he was forced to return to New Spain. He left again in 1547 and did attend some sessions of the council. He took several Indians with him and presented them at Court. While in Spain he was frequently called upon by the emperor and the Council of the Indies to give advice on colonial questions.

He returned to New Spain in 1554. On his stopover in Santo Domingo, he obtained banana seedlings which he introduced into Michoacán. In 1555 he participated in the First Mexican Provincial Council.

He died in his 90s in mid-March 1565. Tradition has it that he was then on a pastoral visit in Uruapan, but sources support that it was rather in the City of Pátzcuaro. He bequeathed his hospitals to the care and protection of the rector of the college of San Nicolás. His body is interred in the basilica of Pátzcuaro.

== Last will ==
The testament of Vasco de Quiroga is dated to January 24, 1565—two months before his death. Here Quiroga laid out his will for the future functioning of the institutions he had established, among them the Colegio de San Nicolas. The will established that the descendants of the Indians of Pátzcuaro who had participated in the building of the Colegio were to receive free education there. He also made provisions for the future expenditure of profits from his Pueblo Hospitals: some will be invested in monthly Mass in commemoration of his parents, and others will be used for wages for the guardians of the Pueblos and the rectors and friars of the Colegio. His 626 books are bequeathed to the Colegio de San Nicolas. He also stated that all of the slaves in his possession were to be freed upon his death.

== Legacy ==
The skills he implanted among Purépecha of the Pátzcuaro region have been passed down to their descendants, who are today considered among the most skilled craftspersons in Mexico. Tata Vasco trained his pupils in a variety of disciplines. His method of specialization by community continues to this day: Paracho produces guitars, Tzintzuntzán pottery, Santa Clara copper products and Nurío woven woolens.

There is a university named for him in Morelia, Michoacán. Miguel Bernal Jiménez wrote an opera, Tata Vasco, commemorating his fourth centenary. It premiered in Pátzcuaro in February, 1941.

He is credited as the founder of the city of Irapuato, Mexico.

== Writings ==
- "Información en derecho del licenciado Quiroga sobre algunas provisiones del Real Consejo de las Indias." Edited by Paulino Castañeda Delgado. Madrid: Ediciones José Porrúa Turanzas, 1974.
- "Ordenanzas de Santa Fe de Vasco de Quiroga" / introducción, paleografía y notas por J. Benedict Warren Morelia, México : Fimax, 1999
- "Testamento del Obispo Vasco de Quiroga" / introducción, paleografía y notas por J. Benedict Warren Morelia, Mexico : Fimax, 1997
