= Alonso de Zuazo =

Governor of New Spain
- In office October 12, 1524 – May 23, 1525 Serving with Alonso de Estrada & Rodrigo de Albornoz (– 29 December 1524); Gonzalo de Salazar & Pedro Almíndez Chirino (– 17 February 1525); Gonzalo de Salazar, Pedro Almíndez Chirino, Alonso de Estrada, & Rodrigo de Albornoz (– 20 April 1525); Gonzalo de Salazar & Pedro Almíndez Chirino (– 23 May 1525)
- Preceded by: Hernán Cortés
- Succeeded by: Gonzalo de Salazar; Pedro Almíndez Chirino

Governor of Santo Domingo
- In office 1524–1528

Governor of Santo Domingo
- In office 1531–1533

Personal details
- Born: 1466 Segovia or Olmedo, Spain
- Died: March 1539 (aged 72–73) Santo Domingo

Alonso de Zuazo (also spelled Suazo) (1466 – March 1539) was a Spanish lawyer and colonial judge and governor in New Spain and in Santo Domingo. He served in New Spain during the period of Hernán Cortés's government and before the appointment of the first viceroy. He was a member of all of the various triumvirates that governed the colony between October 12, 1524 and May 23, 1525, in the absence of Cortés.

== Before assuming authority in New Spain ==
He was a native of Segovia, Spain (according to Bartolomé de Las Casas) or of Olmedo, Spain (according to Francisco Calcagno). He graduated from the University of Salamanca, where he was said to have studied twenty years.

He first arrived in Santo Domingo in 1517, sent there by Cardinal Jiménez de Cisneros to assist the friars of the Order of Jerome in the resolution of political problems in the Indies.

In Santo Domingo, Zuazo wrote to Spanish King Charles I (Holy Roman Emperor Charles V) and William de Croÿ, Charles's chamberlain, to inform them of the hidden costs of slavery in the New World (January 22, 1518). At the same time, he recommended the importation of black slaves, even specifying the age at which they should be imported (15 to 20 years), and that they should marry. They were to replace Indigenous slaves, and he anticipated that they would bring in much gold.

From Santo Domingo, Diego Columbus sent Zuazo to Cuba, as a juez de residencia (judge in a grievance case) in the case of Diego Velázquez de Cuéllar, governor of Cuba (1521–22).

When Charles V granted Hernán Cortés the titles of governor and captain general of New Spain in 1522, he also appointed five officials to oversee Cortés's government. These were Alonso de Estrada as treasurer; Gonzalo de Salazar as factor or tax collector, Rodrigo de Albornoz as auditor, Pedro Almíndez Chirino as inspector, and Lic. Zuazo as justicia mayor or assessor. They arrived in New Spain in 1524 and formed the Tribunal de Cuentas (tribunal of accounts). This was the first office of public finance established in New Spain.

== As a governor of New Spain ==
In 1524 Governor and Captain General Cortés left Mexico City for Honduras to march against Cristóbal de Olid. He left the government in charge of Estrada, Albornoz and Zuazo. The transfer of power occurred October 12, 1524. This triumvirate shared power with the ayuntamiento (city government). The three governors soon quarreled. They nearly came to arms over the appointment of a bailiff.

These three governed for about two and one half months, until December 29, 1524. On that date, with the agreement of the ayuntamiento, Estrada and Albornoz were replaced by Salazar and Almíndez. Zuazo remained in the government. When Cortés had left Mexico City, Salazar and Almíndez had accompanied him as far as Coatzacoalcos. They used this opportunity to convince the conqueror that they should be included in the government. Cortés sent them back with two decrees. The first decree directed that they join the already-formed government of Estrada, Albornoz and Zuazo as its fourth and fifth members, provided that the two groups could reconcile their differences. The second decree directed that Salazar and Almíndez replace Estrada and Albornoz, and continue governing with Zuazo.

When Salazar and Almíndez arrived back in the capital, they suppressed the first of these decrees, and made known only the second one, thus taking over the government. However, they made the mistake of admitting the deception to some friends. This resulted in a scandal, and on February 17, 1525, Estrada and Albornoz were readmitted to the government, which now included all five men mentioned by Cortés. In order of importance, these were Salazar (factor), Almíndez (inspector), Estrada (treasurer), Albornoz (auditor) and Zuazo (justicia mayor).

The expanded governing council was the work of Zuazo, acting as an arbitrator based on the first decree of Cortés. The two factions, however, were not really reconciled. Estrada and Albornoz objected to the arrangement. On April 20, 1525, Salazar and Almíndez proclaimed that no officials were to recognize the authority of Estrada and Albornoz, on pain of 100 lashes and confiscation of property. This proclamation was signed by Zuazo, Cervantes, de la Torre, Sotomayor, Rodrigo de Paz (a relative of and steward for Cortés, and a member of the ayuntamiento), and the clerk Pérez.

Believing that Cortés had perished (or at least claiming to believe it), Salazar and Almíndez then ousted Zuazo on May 23, 1525, and began a tyrannical and criminal government. They began confiscating the property of Cortés and the conquistadors who had accompanied him.

Estrada and Albornoz left Mexico City for Medellín, but before they had traveled eight leagues, Almíndez sent armed men after them and took them prisoner. Albornoz was imprisoned in a fortress, in irons. Salazar then turned his attention to Rodrigo de Paz. Paz was tortured to force him to reveal the location of Cortés's treasure. Zuazo was in touch with Cortés, and communicated the situation to him.

== As governor of Santo Domingo ==
Zuazo served as governor of Santo Domingo, on the island of Hispaniola two times — from 1524 to 1528 and again from 1531 to 1533.

He died in Santo Domingo in March 1539, still in office as oidor. (One source says 1527, but this is likely an error.)
