= San Cristóbal de la Barranca =

- Municipality and town
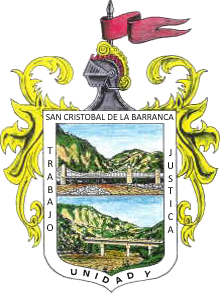
- Coat of arms

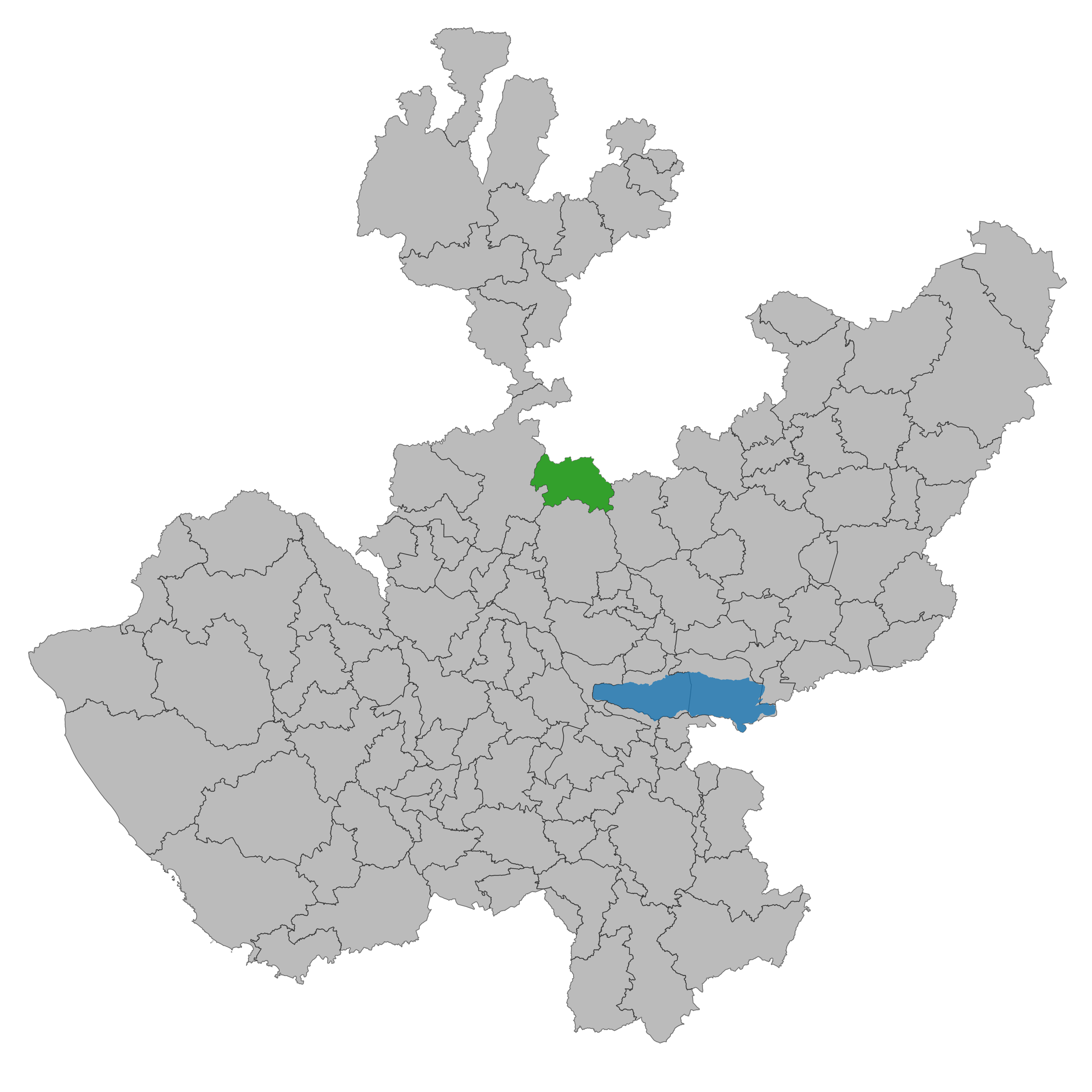
- Location of the municipality in Jalisco

- Location in Mexico
- Coordinates: 20°57′N 103°10′W
- Country: Mexico
- State: Jalisco

Area
  - Total: 523 km^{2} (202 sq mi)
  - Town: 0.27 km^{2} (0.10 sq mi)

Population (2020 census)
  - Total: 2,924
  - Density: 5.59/km^{2} (14.5/sq mi)
  - Town: 843
  - Town density: 3,100/km^{2} (8,100/sq mi)
- Time zone: UTC-6 (Central Standard Time)
- Website: http://sancristobaldelabarrancajalisco.com/

San Cristóbal de la Barranca is a town and municipality, in Jalisco in central-western Mexico. The municipality covers an area of 523 km^{2}.

As of 2020, the municipality had a total population of 2,924.

== Geography ==
=== Limits ===
San Cristóbal de la Barranca is bounded on the north by the state of Zacatecas; on the south by the municipality of Zapopan; on the east by the municipality of Ixtlahuacán del Río; and on the west by the municipality of Tequila.

=== Hydrography ===
The hydrological resources of the municipality are the Santiago, Juchipila, Cuixtla, Mezquital del Oro and Patitos rivers; and the streams of Mojoneras, Cuates, Agua Prieta, Fresno, La Trinidad, Saucillo, Terrero, Carrizalillo, Las Pilas, Guayabo, El Limón and Cántaros.

There are also hot springs and geysers nearby, at the Parque Ecológico Los Hervores on the Rio Patitos between San Cristóbal de la Barranca and Teúl.

== History ==
Before the arrival of the Spaniards, the region of San Cristóbal de la Barranca was inhabited by native tribes allied with Goaxicar, the chief of Xochitepec. In 1530, Cristóbal de Oñate, a Spanish captain in the army of Nuño de Guzmán, arrived here to serve as acting governor. In 1538, during the administration of Diego Pérez de la Torre, governor of Nueva Galicia, the native population revolted against Spanish rule. The governor personally organized the suppression of the insurgents, but his forces were defeated and he was killed when he fell from his horse. In 1540, the inhabitants participated in the Mixton War.

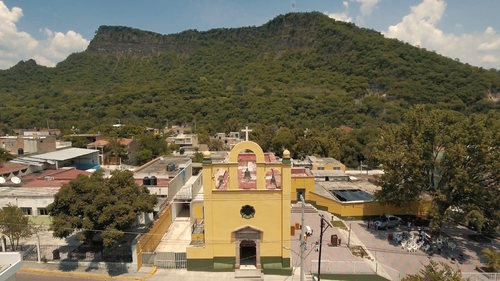
San Cristobal de la Barranco temple

From the second half of the sixteenth century to the first decades of the nineteenth century, San Cristóbal de la Barranca had a corregimiento character. In his Description of New Galicia, Domingo Lázaro de Arregui refers to San Cristóbal de la Barranca in the following terms: "Under the jurisdiction of Tlacotlán, 3 leagues more or less from Guadalajara, to the north, near the road of those who go to Zacatecas and the other band of the river, is the town of San Cristóbal, in the same canyon where the river runs, which is a very deep canyon, and is the reason they call it 'de la Barranca'. It is the seat of this district and has many villages under its jurisdiction: Tecsistlán, Cópala, San Esteban, Ixcatlán and San Juan ...; these towns are of but few people ... The Indians of this jurisdiction take honey from maguey. There are very few people in this band; They are the doctrine of clergymen of the Ocotlan party. The others are administered by friars of San Francisco from the convent of Xuchipila".

These writings refer to the year 1621, the date on which the aforementioned work was carried out.

In 1825 it had a town hall and belonged to the Zapopan department of 1st canton of Guadalajara; It was integrated to this canton from this year until the suppression of that form of political-territorial organization.

In 1838 San Cristobal obtained the status of town; and in 1895 with the same category included 13 police stations.

The current town dates from 1875, the year in which a strong tremor destroyed the previous one. Produced by the volcano "El Ceboruco", at 11:30 p.m. from February 11 of the aforementioned year an underground noise was heard, a trepidatory tremor immediately arose that was repeated five minutes later, leaving the population in ruins. There the town was founded again.

The date of its beginning status as a municipality is not known, although the decree of 1 May 1886, which indicates the Territorial and Political Division of the State of Jalisco, already mentions it as such.
