= Naco (Honduras) =

Archaeological site in Honduras

Naco is a prehispanic archaelogical site located in the Quimistán municipality of the Santa Bárbara Department in northwestern Honduras. It was inhabited during the late postclassic period. The modern town of the same name near the Chamelecón River overlaps with the eastern portion of the prehispanic settlement.

The site has an area of 90 hectares, centered on the north bank of the Naco River. There are residential mounds throughout the site, but are most dense in the center which includes multiple large elite residences and a ballcourt. Naco manufactured two distinct groups of ceramics: Santa Bárbara, which includes most everyday implements, is absent from the center and shows links to eastern Guatemala, and Cortés, which is only found in the center and shows links to postclassic highland Maya centers like Qʼumarkaj, as well as to Cihuatan and Managua.

Naco was an important part of regional trade networks stretching to the Mexican state of Tabasco, the Yucatán Peninsula, highland Guatemala, and interior Honduras. It imported goods like obsidian (at least partially from eastern Guatemala), jade, gold, cacao and feathers. Maya nobles from Xicalango, Chetumal and elsewhere resided in Naco in order to oversee commercial exchanges. Archaeological studies suggest that trade may have expanded here following the arrival of a new population, possibly from Tabasco, circa 1250 AD. According to Francisco de Montejo, Naco had a population of about 10,000, and according to Hernán Cortés, Naco (not including surrounding settlements) had over 2,000 houses. Spanish accounts seem to imply that Naco was the political capital of a region that included Quimistán, Choloma and Sula, but this is not certain.

The ethnolinguistic identity of the site is debated, but it is agreed that Naco lay near the eastern border of Maya civilization. Some researchers suggest that the commoners were Chʼolan-speakers while the ruling elite were Nahuas/Pipil who spoke Nawat, or that the ruling elite received Nahua influences. It is also possible that Naco and other nearby settlements contained minority Tolupan quarters (barrios or calpulli). The possible Nahua presence is evidenced by the fact that both La Malinche and the Aztec allies of Cortés spoke to inhabitants of Naco without additional interpreters. Furthermore, Spanish scribe Diego Cavallero indicated in 1525 that the people of Naco had come from the Pacific coast.

The Spanish conquest of Mesoamerica in the early 16th century disrupted regional trade, which caused the decline and abandonment of Naco before Cortés reached it in 1525. However, the conquistadors took advantage of its strategic location to use it as a military base. It may have been the place where Cristóbal de Olid died, when Francisco de las Casas and Gil González Dávila (rival conquistadors he had captured) rebelled. Olid fled, but his rivals found and publicly beheaded him in the plaza of Naco. An account of this event is apparently preserved in modern local oral tradition. From 1536 onward, San Pedro Sula eclipsed Naco in importance, and by 1586, the population had declined to only 10.
