= Alonso de Ávalos Saavedra =

Captain of the Province of Ávalos

Captain of the Province of Ávalos (in New Spain)
- Hidalgo
- In office 1523–1575
- Preceded by: Office created
- Succeeded by: ?

Mayor of Sayula

Personal details
- Born: Alonso de Ávalos Saavedra circa 1495 Medellín, Spain
- Died: 1575 Amatitlán, Sayula, Province of Ávalos, New Spain
- Spouse(s): Francisca de Estrada y Gutiérrez-Flórez, m. circa 1530
- Parent(s): Pedro López de Saavedra, Isabel Rangel y Ávalos
- Occupation: Encomendero, explorer, captain
- Nickname: El Viejo (The Old Man)

Alonso de Ávalos Saavedra (Medellín, Badajoz, Extremadura, Spain, c. 1495 – Amatitlán, Sayula, province of Ávalos, New Spain, 1575) was a Castilian encomendero, explorer, conquistador, founder, captain, and mayor of Sayula.

== Biography ==
In 1521, during the times the House of Trastámara ruled over Spain and its possessions, he organized an expedition to conquer the territory that today constitutes southern Jalisco, where he arrived in 1523, conquered Tzaulan (today, Sayula), "Place where flies abound", and established the capital city of the province of Ávalos there. He was a cousin of Hernán Cortés.

The Province of Ávalos extended southwest of Lake Chapala, its capital was Sayula, and was part of the Viceroyalty of New Spain, unlike most of the current state of Jalisco, which along with Aguascalientes, Nayarit, Zacatecas and areas of San Luis Potosí and Sinaloa, constituted the Nueva Galicia.

He was a brother of Francisco de Saavedra Sandoval. Around 1530, Alonso de Ávalos married Francisca de Estrada y Gutiérrez-Flórez, daughter of Alonso de Estrada and Marina Gutiérrez-Flórez.

== See also ==
- Hernán Cortés
- Nuño de Guzmán
