= Sebastián Ramírez de Fuenleal =

Spanish bishop and colonial administrator

- Born: c. 1490; Villaescusa de Haro, Cuenca, Spain
- Died: 22 January 1547; Valladolid, Spain
- Education: University of Valladolid
- Occupations: Bishop, judge, bureaucrat

President of the Real Audiencia of Mexico
- In office 10 January 1531 – 16 April 1535
- Monarch: Charles I
- Preceded by: Nuño de Guzmán of the first Audiencia
- Succeeded by: Antonio de Mendoza, Viceroy of New Spain

President of the Real Audiencia of Santo Domingo
- In office 1528–1531

Bishop of Santo Domingo
- In office 1528–1531

Signature
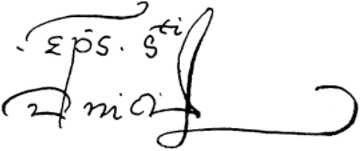

Sebastián Ramírez de Fuenleal (c. 1490 – January 22, 1547) was bishop of Santo Domingo and president of the Real Audiencia of Santo Domingo from 1528 to 1531. He was also president of the second Real Audiencia of Mexico from January 10, 1531, to April 16, 1535. Later he was a member of the Council of the Indies.

== Early life ==
Ramírez de Fuenleal was born in Cuenca, to a family of the hidalgo class. He entered the University of Valladolid at the age of 16, where he received a degree in canon law. In 1520 he became inquisitor of Seville. He was later a member of the Royal Chancery of Granada.

== Bishop of Santo Domingo ==
He was named bishop of Santo Domingo and president of its audiencia, occupying these positions from 1528 to 1531. In Hispaniola he punished mistreatment of the Indians, reorganized the treasury, and faced the rebellion of Enriquillo of the Bahoruco. He built schools, established villages and constructed public works. He paid particular attention to mining, and to the rights of the Indians.

At this time the African slave trade to Hispaniola and Cuba was just beginning, in order to supply labor for the mines and for sugar production. Ramírez did not oppose this slave trade, which was considered necessary at the time. He did oppose monopolies in the slave trade that led to inflated prices.

== President of the Audiencia of Mexico ==
The Real Audiencia of Mexico, a high court, was the highest governing authority in New Spain until the establishment of the viceroyalty of New Spain in 1535. The second Audiencia was named in a royal decree dated January 12, 1530, to supplant the disastrous first Audiencia of Nuño de Guzmán. It included Ramírez as president and Juan de Salmerón, Alonso de Maldonado, Francisco Ceinos and Vasco de Quiroga as oidores (judges). These individuals had been nominated by the bishop of Badajoz, who was also president of the Chancery of Valladolid. In contrast to the members of the first Audiencia, all of these men were honest, honorable and capable. All held the academic degree of licenciado (licentiate).

The nominated oidores were located in various parts of Spain at the time; Ramírez was in Santo Domingo. The king directed that whoever among them arrived first in New Spain should begin immediately to govern.

Conquistador Hernán Cortés was returning to New Spain from Spain at about this time. He had just successfully defended his previous actions before the king, and was newly created Marqués del Valle de Oaxaca and reappointed captain general of the colony. He stopped in Santo Domingo on his way, to become acquainted with Ramírez. Cortés continued on to Mexico, arriving at Veracruz on July 15, 1530.

Ramírez and Quiroga arrived in Mexico City in early October. They took time to find lodgings and rest before they taking over the government. They began to exercise government functions on January 10, 1531. Ramírez carried with him a letter of strong reprimand for Mexico City Bishop Juan de Zumárraga and instructions to begin juicios de residencia against the members of the First Audiencia (Nuño Beltrán de Guzmán, Juan Ortiz de Matienzo and Diego Delgadillo), as well as Cortés and Diego Hernández de Proaño. These investigations took place in due time.

The Second Audiencia improved the road from Veracruz to Mexico City, and along the way founded the city of Puebla de los Angeles as a resting-place for travelers (April 16, 1531). It imported horses and cattle from Spain, took steps to import a printing press, founded the Colegio de Santa Cruz de Tlatelolco for higher learning for young indigenous men to prepare them to be ordained to the priesthood, renewed exploration, and continued work on the cathedral of Mexico City.

Ramírez was enthusiastic about the abilities of the Indians and as Bishop of Santo Domingo urged the Franciscans to teach alphabetic literacy and grammar to the Indians in New Spain, which was initiated by Fray Arnaldo de Basaccio, who later taught at the Colegio de Santa Cruz de Tlatelolco after its establishment. Ramírez was encouraged by this initial step of teaching "the natives in the common language of Mexico" (i.e., Nahuatl), going on to say that "the natives are showing such intelligence and capacity that they are a great deal better at it than the Spaniards. Without any doubt whatever, within two years there will be fifty Indians who will know grammar and teach it. I am watching the project closely because of the great good that will result from it."

Ramírez was among those who encouraged the Franciscan missionaries in Mexico to investigate and document the pre-Columbian cultures of the Aztec Empire. He was a defender of the human rights of the Indigenous population. He proposed the substitution of payment in kind and encomiendas to replace the payment of tributes then imposed on the Indians. He ordered the construction of an aqueduct to supply Mexico City. He pacified the country and organized the laws, paving the way for the arrival of the first viceroy, Don Antonio de Mendoza, in 1535.

The year 1532 was a tumultuous one in New Spain. For one thing, the crown brought the institution of slavery under regulation. The enslavement of Indians was prohibited. Also, the Audiencia brought back verdicts on the juicios de residencia of Cortés, the oidores of the First Audiencia, and others. Cortés and Bishop Zumárraga were acquitted; Ortiz de Matienzo and Delgadillo were convicted, but not sentenced. On April 25, 1532, Emperor Charles V signed a degree raising Antequera (now the city of Oaxaca) to the rank of a city (ciudad).

Meantime the calumnies spread by the enemies of Bishop Zumárraga and the partisans of the first Audiencia had shaken the confidence of the Spanish Court. Zumárraga was ordered to return to Spain to defend himself before the Council of the Indies. He set sail in May 1532. Zumárraga, however, had little difficulty vindicating his good name, and was formally consecrated bishop at Valladolid on April 27, 1533. He returned to New Spain in October 1534 while Ramírez was still president of the Audiencia.

== Later career ==
On August 25, 1535, news was received in Mexico City of the expected arrival of Don Antonio de Mendoza, the first viceroy of New Spain. Mendoza took over governmental functions from the Audiencia on November 14, 1535, the day of his arrival. Ramírez, who was ill, returned to Spain in 1537 to recover his health. He was successively bishop of Tuy (1538), León (1539) and Cuenca (1542). From 1540 he was president of the Chancery of Valladolid and a member of the Council of the Indies, the body that oversaw the overseas empire. He had some involvement in the New Laws of 1542 that limited the encomienda, serving as editor.

He died on January 22, 1547, in Valladolid, Spain. At the time of his death he was president of the Chancery of Valladolid and bishop of Cuenca. He was interred in the Dominican convent of La Santa Cruz, in the town of Villaescusa de Haro, where he had been born.

== See also ==
- List of Viceroys of New Spain

== External links and additional sources ==
- Cheney, David M. "Archdiocese of Santo Domingo". Catholic-Hierarchy.org. (for Chronology of Bishops) ^{[self-published]}
- Chow, Gabriel. "Metropolitan Archdiocese of Santo Domingo". GCatholic.org. (for Chronology of Bishops) ^{[self-published]}
- Cheney, David M. "Diocese of Tui-Vigo". Catholic-Hierarchy.org. (for Chronology of Bishops) ^{[self-published]}
- Chow, Gabriel. "Diocese of Tui-Vigo (Spain)". GCatholic.org. (for Chronology of Bishops) ^{[self-published]}
- (in Spanish) Short biography on MSN Encarta

Catholic Church titles
| Preceded by Luis de Figueroa | Bishop of Santo Domingo; 1528–1538 | Succeeded by Alfonso de Fuenmayor |
| Preceded by Diego de Avellaneda | Bishop of Tui; 1538–1539 | Succeeded by Miguel Muñoz (bishop) |
| Preceded by Fernando Valdés | Bishop of León; 1539–1542 | Succeeded by Esteban Almeida |
| Preceded by Alessandro Cesarini | Bishop of Cuenca; 1542–1547 | Succeeded by Miguel Muñoz (bishop) |
