= Obedezco pero no cumplo =

Phrase that was used in Spanish America

"Obedezco pero no cumplo" (English: I obey but I do not comply) is a phrase that was used in Spanish America throughout much of the colonial period to describe the attitude of local colonial officials towards the rule of the Spanish Crown. In the Spanish system, the King was represented in the new world directly by a Viceroy, with further powers delegated to regional bureaucrats. These bureaucrats maintained significant autonomy, occasionally resulting in this response to an official royal decree in situations where they believed it to be inappropriate or unjust.

- Don Antonio de Mendoza's (first viceroy of New Spain) reply to the King of Spain when he didn't enact the new laws requested by the king due to the possibility of a rebellion in the silver mines.
- The Marquis de Varinas wrote that the corregidores' "sole concern is to find means of paying off his large debts and to make a profit from his employment."
- After relating how Cortés was recalled by Velazquez and obeyed the summons, although he did not think it fit to comply with it, as the phrase was in those times in South America (When an order came from Spain that was impossible to execute, the Viceroy, after putting the letter to his forehead just as the Arabs do to-day with and important letter, wrote on it "I obey, but do not comply {Obedezco pero no cumplo}, and the incident was closed."
