= Miguel Muñoz (bishop) =

Roman Catholic Prelate

Most Reverend Miguel Muñoz
- Bishop of Cuenca
- Church: Catholic Church
- Diocese: Diocese of Cuenca
- In office: 1547–1553
- Predecessor: Sebastián Ramírez de Fuenleal
- Successor: Pedro Castro Lemos

Personal details
- Died: 13 September 1553 Cuenca, Spain

Miguel Muñoz (died 1553) was a Roman Catholic prelate who served as Bishop of Cuenca (1547–1553) and Bishop of Tui (1540–1547).

== Biography ==
On 28 January 1540, Miguel Muñoz was appointed during the papacy of Pope Paul III as Bishop of Tui. On 12 April 1547, he was appointed during the papacy of Pope Paul III as Bishop of Cuenca. He served as Bishop of Cuenca until his death on 13 September 1553.

== External links and additional sources ==
- Cheney, David M. "Diocese of Tui-Vigo". Catholic-Hierarchy.org. (for Chronology of Bishops) ^{[self-published]}
- Chow, Gabriel. "Diocese of Tui-Vigo (Spain)". GCatholic.org. (for Chronology of Bishops) ^{[self-published]}
- Cheney, David M. "Diocese of Cuenca". Catholic-Hierarchy.org. (for Chronology of Bishops) ^{[self-published]}
- Chow, Gabriel. "Diocese of Cuenca (Spain)". GCatholic.org. (for Chronology of Bishops) ^{[self-published]}

Catholic Church titles
Preceded by Sebastián Ramírez de Fuenleal	Bishop of Tui; 1540–1547	Succeeded by Juan de San Millán
Preceded by Sebastián Ramírez de Fuenleal	Bishop of Cuenca; 1547–1553	Succeeded by Pedro Castro Lemos
