= Francisco de la Cueva =

Spanish dramatist, philologist, and lawyer

Francisco de la Cueva y Silva
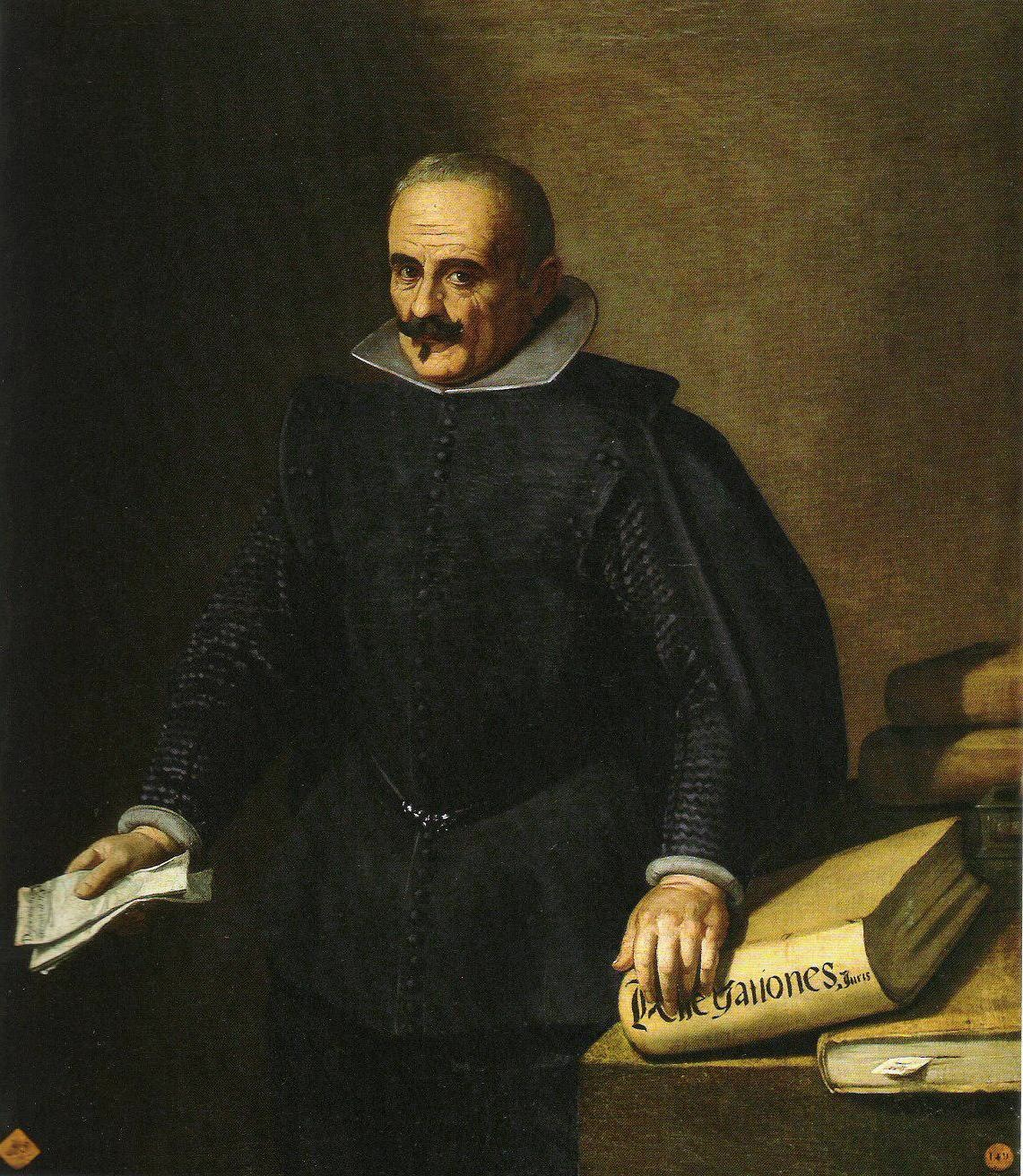
- Francisco de la Cueva (1625) by Juan van der Hamen.
- Born: 1550; Medina del Campo
- Died: 1621

Francisco de la Cueva y Silva (Born Medina del Campo, 1550 - died Madrid, 1621), dramatist, philologist and Spanish lawyer of the Golden Age, he was also the uncle of the playwright Leonor de la Cueva y Silva.
