= Rodrigo de Albornoz =

Governor of New Spain

Governor of New Spain
- In office 12 October 1524 – 29 December 1524 Serving with Alonso de Estrada and Alonso de Zuazo
- Preceded by: Hernán Cortés
- Succeeded by: Gonzalo de Salazar; Pedro Almíndez Chirino; Alonso de Zuazo
- In office 17 February 1525 – 20 April 1525 Serving with Gonzalo de Salazar, Pedro Almíndez Chirino, Alonso de Estrada, & Alonso de Zuazo
- Preceded by: Gonzalo de Salazar; Pedro Almíndez Chirino; Alonso de Zuazo
- Succeeded by: Gonzalo de Salazar; Pedro Almíndez Chirino; Alonso de Zuazo
- In office 29 January 1526 – 24 June 1526 Serving with Alonso de Estrada
- Preceded by: Gonzalo de Salazar; Pedro Almíndez Chirino
- Succeeded by: Hernán Cortés

Personal details
- Occupation: Accountant, bureaucrat

Rodrigo de Albornoz was an auditor and colonial official in New Spain during the period of Hernán Cortés's government, and before the appointment of the first viceroy. He was a member of the triumvirates that governed the colony for several short periods between 1524 and 1528, in the absence of Cortés.

== Before assuming authority in New Spain ==
Albornoz may have first arrived in Mexico in 1519, with the expedition of Pánfilo de Narváez, sent to enforce royal control over Hernán Cortés and the first conquistadors. He was secretary to Emperor Charles V when the latter appointed him contador (accountant or auditor) of New Spain, on October 15, 1522.

When Spanish King Charles I (Holy Roman Emperor Charles V) granted Hernán Cortés the titles of governor and captain general of New Spain in 1522, he also appointed five officials to oversee Cortés's government. These were Alonso de Estrada as treasurer; Gonzalo de Salazar as factor or tax collector, Albornoz as auditor, Pedro Almíndez Chirino as inspector, and Lic. Alonso de Zuazo as justicia mayor or assessor. They arrived in New Spain in 1524 and formed the Tribunal de Cuentas (tribunal of accounts). This was the first office of public finance established in New Spain. Cristóbal de Oñate, Albornoz's assistant, arrived with him.

== First period in government ==
In 1524 Governor and Captain General Cortés left Mexico City for Honduras to march against Cristóbal de Olid. He had intended that Albornoz accompany him on the expedition, but because of the illness of the latter, he remained in Mexico City. Cortés left the government in charge of Estrada, Albornoz and Zuazo. The transfer of power occurred October 12, 1524. This triumvirate shared power with the ayuntamiento (city government). The ayuntamiento was composed of partisans of Cortés; Estrada and Albornoz were his enemies. However, since these men held independent royal appointments, Cortés had little choice about whom to leave in charge.

The three governors soon quarreled. They nearly came to arms over the appointment of a bailiff.

They governed for about two and one half months, until December 29, 1524. On that date, with the agreement of the ayuntamiento, Estrada and Albornoz were replaced by Salazar and Almíndez. Zuazo remained in the government. When Cortés had left Mexico City, Salazar and Almíndez had accompanied him as far as Coatzacoalcos. They used this opportunity to convince the conqueror that they should be included in the government. Cortés sent them back with two decrees. The first decree directed that they join the already-formed government of Estrada, Albornoz and Zuazo as its fourth and fifth members, provided that the two groups could reconcile their differences. The second decree directed that Salazar and Almíndez replace Estrada and Albornoz, and continue governing with Zuazo.

When Salazar and Almíndez arrived back in the capital, they suppressed the first of these decrees, and made known only the second one, thus taking over the government.

== Second period in government ==
However, they made the mistake of admitting the deception to some friends. This resulted in a scandal, and on February 17, 1525, Estrada and Albornoz were readmitted to the government, which now included all five men mentioned by Cortés. In order of importance, these were Salazar (factor), Almíndez (inspector), Estrada (treasurer), Albornoz (auditor) and Zuazo (justicia mayor).

The expanded governing council was the work of Zuazo, acting as an arbitrator based on the first decree of Cortés. The two factions, however, were not really reconciled. Estrada and Albornoz objected to the arrangement. On April 20, 1525, Salazar and Almíndez proclaimed that no officials were to recognize the authority of Estrada and Albornoz, on pain of 100 lashes and confiscation of property. This proclamation was signed by Zuazo, Cervantes, de la Torre, Sotomayor, Rodrigo de Paz (a relative of and steward for Cortés, and a member of the ayuntamiento), and the clerk Pérez.

Salazar and Almíndez soon ousted Zuazo, and began a tyrannical and criminal government.

Estrada and Albornoz left Mexico City for Medellín, but before they had traveled eight leagues, Almíndez sent armed men after them and took them prisoner. Albornoz was imprisoned in a fortress, in irons. Salazar then turned his attention to Rodrigo de Paz. Paz was tortured to force him to reveal the location of Cortés's treasure.

== Third period in government ==
In early 1526 a messenger (Martín de Orantes or Dorantes) from Cortés arrived in Mexico City. His instructions were to replace Salazar and Almíndez in the governing triumvirate with Francisco de las Casas and Pedro de Alvarado. In the absence or incapacity of Las Casas and Alvarado, Estrada and Albornoz were named as replacements. Orantes entered the city in secret and made contact with members of the opposition.

At daybreak on January 28, 1526, Orantes and other opponents of Salazar and Almíndez left the convent where they were staying, marched along the streets shouting "Viva Cortés", arrested Salazar, and succeeded in getting the ayuntamiento to execute the orders of Cortés. Estrada and Albornoz rejoined the government, because Las Casas and Alvarado were absent. Almíndez was arrested later in Tlaxcala, and brought back to Mexico City. This time Estrada and Albornoz governed from January 29, 1526, to June 24, 1526, or just short of six months. Cortés returned and took up the government again (very briefly) on June 25, 1526. Salazar and Almíndez did not return to the government again. Neither did Albornoz, who soon left to return to Spain.

== His report to the emperor ==
Albornoz sent a letter of report to Emperor Charles V, dated December 15, 1525. The letter included a number of observations and recommendations.

- He denounced the enslavement of the Indigenous: "[I]t causes havoc in the land, and the people who may be converted [to Christianity] will be lost if it is not remedied soon... [I]t is a great matter of conscience." (The Spanish Crown prohibited or severely restricted enslavement of the Indians in 1523, 1526, 1528, 1530, 1534, 1542 (Leyes Nuevas), 1543, 1548, 1550, 1553, 1556, 1568, etc.). Albornoz did not, however, recommend the complete abolition of slavery, and in fact personally held a license to import 150 black slaves.
- He accused Cortés of killing many Indigenous.
- He reported on the state of agriculture, business, the Church and the administration in the colony.
- He gave strong support to the Christianization of the Indigenous, claiming that a single convert among them was worth 50 missionaries.
- He reported the periodic appearance of "distant traders" in dugout canoes who came to exchange "excellent things" for local goods in the port of Zacatula, located at the mouth of the Río Balsas in western Mexico. (This river forms the boundary between the present-day Mexican states of Michoacán and Guerrero.) These merchants sometimes remained in the area for five or six months, until good weather and calm seas permitted a safe return to their southern homeland. The origin of these traders is not known. There is speculation that they arrived from the Inca domains in South America.
- He proposed the enactment of sumptuary laws, and proposed moving the capital to a location more easily defensible (but without mentioning the advantage of moving somewhere not subject to nearly annual flooding).

== Other activities in New Spain ==
About the year 1529, he and Pedro Moreno organized sugar plantations and mills at Zempoala, near Veracruz. It was for this project that he needed the black slaves.

He strongly advised the king to replace Cortés in the government of New Spain. He recommended that no ship leave Seville for Veracruz without transporting some varieties of useful plants to the Indies.

His house, on the corner of 16 de Septiembre and 5 de Febrero Streets in Mexico City, was a monumental building in an eclectic style. It was converted into the Gran Hotel of Mexico City.
