= Diego Pérez de la Torre =

- Born: 1482; Almendralejo, Extremadura, Spain
- Died: 1538 (aged 55–56); Tonalá, Nueva Galicia (Present-day Jalisco, Mexico).
- Occupations: Conquistador, attorney, general of the Spanish armies and Governor of Nueva Galicia

licenciado Diego Pérez de la Torre, born in Almendralejo, Spain (c. 1482 – 1538), was a Spanish conquistador, colonial administrator, royal attorney for the Court of Castile and second Governor of the Kingdom of Nueva Galicia, following the removal of Nuño de Guzmán.

== Governorship and Death ==
Diego Pérez de la Torre was appointed captain general and second governor of the Kingdom of Nueva Galicia (present-day Jalisco, Mexico) in 1536. He arrived the following year at Compostela, where Cristobal de Oñate had been acting as governor for a short time since Nuño de Guzmán's departure. Pérez de la Torre's policy towards the indigenous people was radically different from that of Nuño de Guzmán, and although it had a beneficial effect on the kingdom, it was too late to atone for past outrages, or to evade the storm of general revolt that was gathering among the indigenous tribes. The governor, however, was spared the humiliation of failure. While engaged in a campaign against rebellious tribes, and after winning a hard-fought battle, he was mortally wounded after falling from his horse early in 1538. He was carried back to Tonalá, where his wife and children awaited his return. He lay dying in his bed for a few days before summoning the priest and guardian of the parish church of St. Francis, Fr. Antonio de Segovia. The priest heard the confession of the honorable Diego Pérez de la Torre and administered the last rites of the Catholic Church. After receiving the holy sacraments, shortly before his death, he tried to put the government back in order by bringing in the other government officials, including, the clerk Diego Hurtado who would draw up and witness the documents and Captain Cristóbal de Oñate, whom he would appoint as his successor. The dying Diego Pérez de la Torre began the appointment of Oñate in this manner: "In the name of Almighty God and of Mary, the Most Serene Queen of Angels and with her divine favor, and in the name of the Emperor Charles V, King of Castile. I the licenciado Diego Pérez de la Torre, who is present governor of the kingdom of Nueva Galicia, by authority that I have, and in conformity with the Justice and military officials and other captains of this kingdom and Village of Guadalajara, I appoint as Governor after my death and days, Captain Cristóbal de Oñate, a person who has three times served said government, with righteousness of service... and I give him power which I have from His Majesty for the exercise of that government." After his pronouncement, he embraced Oñate, and with many tears gave him all the documents and provisions of the king, and then Diego Pérez de la Torre spoke with great respect and love of all the blessings he had received from God, and he told Oñate to always remember God and to faithfully serve the king. Then he asked Oñate to look after his family and especially his two daughters, who were poor and unmarried. And the captain Cristóbal de Oñate promised to obey him in everything and follow these orders and instructions, which he did faithfully fulfil. And to the assembled military and colonial officials and other noble people gathered at the home of Diego Pérez de la Torre he told them to respect Captain Oñate as a person who had always faithfully served God and king and then he apologized to anyone if he ever did anything to offend them; and having disposed of all the things of his soul, he died in the year of Our Lord, 1538. He was 56. His body was buried in the convent of St. Francis of Tetlán, which was the first to be founded in this province, about a league from where Guadalajara is now. When the new convent was founded in the city of Guadalajara, the bones of the honorable don Diego Pérez de la Torre were transferred with great reverence to new convent.

Oñate again became acting governor; but before the end of the year the viceroy appointed Francisco Vazquez de Coronado to succeed Diego Pérez de la Torre. The new ruler left Oñate still in command as lieutenant-governor, and himself made a tour of his province, subsequently engaging in an expedition to the far north. An attempt was made to continue Pérez de la Torre's policy toward the natives, and for a few years the general outbreak was deferred.

== Family ==
Don Diego Pérez de la Torre was born in Almendralejo, Spain in 1482. His family were most likely hidalgos. Diego Pérez de la Torre was married to doña Catalina Mejía. They had at least four known children: the priest, fray Diego de la Torre, Melchor Pérez, Catalina de la Torre and María Álvarez de la Torre who was married to Captain Hernán Flores, conquistador of Nueva Galicia and Alférez Mayor of the Royal Armies in the conquest and pacification of Nueva Galicia.
