= Luis de la Torre =

Spanish conquistador

Governor of New Spain
- In office 2 March 1527 – 8 December 1528 Serving with Alonso de Estrada (– 8 December 1528) and Gonzalo de Salazar (– 22 August 1527)
- Preceded by: Marcos de Aguilar
- Succeeded by: Nuño Beltrán de Guzmán of the first Royal Audiencia of Mexico

Personal details
- Occupation: Bureaucrat

Luis de la Torre was one of the Spanish conquistadors who governed New Spain while Hernán Cortés was absent from the capital.

== History ==
There was much infighting during this period (1524–28). Nine men were involved in the government, not including Cortés himself, who made a very brief return in 1526. They usually formed a governing council of three, never more than five, and occasionally only one or two. This interval began with Cortés's expedition to Honduras and ended with the arrival of the first Audiencia Real.

Not much is known about la Torre. He was in the government of the Viceroyalty of New Spain from March 2, 1527, to December 8, 1528, or about 1 year and 9 months.

Alonso de Estrada was also in the government for this period, and for the early part (until August 22, 1527), so was Gonzalo de Sandoval. La Torre and Estrada were cousins.

On the latter date, a royal decree was received in Mexico City, ratifying the transfer of powers granted by Luis Ponce de León to Marcos de Aguilar, but Aguilar had died on March 1. Before he died, Aguilar had named Estrada governor, and this decree from Spain solidified Estrada's position. Since Cortés was suspected of poisoning both Luis Ponce de León and Aguilar, he was not in a position to challenge Alonso de Estrada and Luis de la Torre.

A person named Luis de la Torre accompanied Christopher Columbus to the New World on one of his voyages, and is credited with being the co-discoverer (among Europeans) of tobacco. However, that may have been the uncle of this man.

== See also ==
- 1520s in New Spain
