= Alonso de Estrada =

Governor of New Spain

Alonso Duque de Estrada y Fernández de Aragón

Governor of New Spain
- In office 2 March 1527 – 8 December 1528 Serving with Luis de la Torre (– 8 December 1528) and Gonzalo de Sandoval (– 22 August 1527)
- Preceded by: Marcos de Aguilar
- Succeeded by: Nuño Beltrán de Guzmán of the first Royal Audiencia of Mexico
- In office 29 January 1526 – 24 June 1526 Serving with Rodrigo de Albornoz
- Preceded by: Gonzalo de Salazar; Pedro Almíndez Chirino
- Succeeded by: Hernán Cortés
- In office 12 October 1524 – 29 December 1524 Serving with Rodrigo de Albornoz and Alonso de Zuazo
- Preceded by: Hernán Cortés
- Succeeded by: Gonzalo de Salazar; Pedro Almíndez Chirino; Alonso de Zuazo

Personal details
- Born: Alonso Duque de Estrada y Fernández de Aragón c. 1470 Ciudad Real, Castile
- Died: 16 February 1530 Ignacio de la Llave, Veracruz
- Spouse: Marina de la Caballería (m. 1508)
- Occupation: Commander, bureaucrat

Alonso Duque de Estrada (c. 1470, Ciudad Real, Castile – 16 February 1530, Veracruz) was a colonial official in New Spain during the period of Hernán Cortés' government, and before the appointment of the first viceroy. He was a member of the triumvirates that governed the colony for several short periods between 1524 and 1528, in the absence of Cortés.

== Origins and early career ==
Don Alonso Duque de Estrada y Fernández de Aragón is the first-born natural son of King Ferdinand II of Aragon by his part-crypto-Jewish mistress María Luisa Duque de Estrada y López de Ayala before he wed Isabel I of Castile and León.

He was taken in and recognized as the son of the Catholic King due to a long-standing relationship with María Luisa de Estrada, daughter of Don Fernando Duque de Estrada Manrique de Lara y Guzman and Aldonza López de Ayala. Although this has allegedly been refuted by the 1585 limpieza de sangre of his great-grandson, Gobernador Jorge de Alvarado y Villafañé considering the phenomenon of laundering lineages to avoid further doubt as to any claim of nobility.

He was well educated and a formidable military commander. He fought in the wars in Flanders, and afterwards, as an admiral, in the campaigns in Málaga and Sicily. Returning to Madrid, he fought in the Castilian War of the Communities, opposing the rebels against Emperor Charles V. For this, Charles rewarded him with the position of corregidor of Cáceres, and later named him treasurer of New Spain. In letters, Alonso de Estrada was sometimes referred to as "el magnífico señor el thesorero Alonso de Estrada, gobernador de esta Nueva España por sus majestades. His loyalist marrano wife Marina Gutiérrez de la Caballería y Flores de Guevara eventually joined him in his efforts, in 1523.

== Royal treasurer of New Spain ==
He arrived to the New Spain in 1523, appointed treasurer of the colony by the Council of the Indies, on the authority of Charles V. His mission was to participate in the government of Cortés and to protect the interests of the Crown. Marcos de Aguilar and Luis Ponce de León (governor of New Spain) (colonial official) were also sent by the Crown to act as judges in the juicio de residencia of Cortés, but Ponce de León died of indigestion contracted at his welcoming banquet. He was rumored to have been poisoned by Hernan Cortés.

== First period in government ==
In 1524 Governor and Captain General Cortés left Mexico City for Honduras. He left the government in charge of Estrada, Rodrigo de Albornoz and Alonso de Zuazo. Zuazo (also spelt Suazo) held the additional office of Justicia-Mayor. The transfer of power occurred October 12, 1524. This triumvirate shared power with the ayuntamiento (city government). The ayuntamiento was composed of partisans of Cortés; Estrada and Albornoz were (or soon would be) his enemies. At one point Estrada issued orders to prevent the reentry of Cortés into Mexico City.

The three men governed for about two and one-half months, until December 29, 1524. On that date, with the agreement of the ayuntamiento, two of them were replaced by Gonzalo de Salazar and Pedro Almíndez Chirino. Alonso de Zuazo remained. This was on Cortés's instructions, brought back from Coatzacoalcos by Salazar and Almíndez, in order to end disagreements between Albornoz and Estrada. The change was thought to have been brought about by the intrigues of Salazar.

== Second period in government ==
Estrada returned to the government from February 17, 1525, to April 20, 1525. It now contained five members—Salazar, Almíndez, Estrada, Albornoz and Zuazo. On the latter date, Salazar and Almíndez proclaimed that no one was to recognize the authority of Estrada and Albornoz, on pain of 100 lashes and confiscation of property. This proclamation was signed by Zuazo, Cervantes, de la Torre, Sotomayor, Rodrigo de Paz (a member of the ayuntamiento), and the clerk Pérez. Estrada and Albornoz left Mexico City for Medellín, but before they had traveled eight leagues, Almíndez sent armed men after them and took them prisoner.

== Third period in government ==
In early 1526 a messenger (Martín de Orantes or Dorantes) from Cortés arrived in Mexico City. His instructions were to replace Gonzalo de Salazar and Pedro Almíndez Chirino in the governing triumvirate with Francisco de las Casas and Pedro de Alvarado. In the absence or incapacity of Las Casas and Alvarado, Estrada and Albornoz were named as replacements. Orantes entered the city in secret and made contact with members of the opposition.

At daybreak on January 28, 1526, Orantes and other opponents of Salazar and Almíndez left the convent where they were staying, marched along the streets shouting "Viva Cortés", arrested Salazar, and succeeded in getting the ayuntamiento to execute the orders of Cortés. Estrada and Albornoz rejoined the government, because Las Casas and Alvarado were absent. Almíndez was arrested later in Tlaxcala, and brought back to Mexico City. Estrada and Albornoz governed from January 29, 1526, to June 24, 1526, or just short of six months. Cortés returned and took up the government again (very briefly) on June 25, 1526.

== Fourth period in government ==
Estrada governed a fourth time from March 2, 1527, to December 8, 1528, with Gonzalo de Sandoval and Luis de la Torre, for about 21 months. (Sandoval was part of the government only until August 22, 1527). On August 22, a royal decree was received in Mexico City, ratifying the transfer of powers granted by Luis Ponce de León to Marcos de Aguilar, but Aguilar had died on March 1. Aguilar had named Estrada governor, and this decree solidified his position. Since Cortés was suspected of poisoning Ponce de León and Aguilar, he was not in a position to challenge Estrada.

== Death and succession ==
Estrada died in Mexico City in the period 1533 to 1537. An act of the Mexico City government dated September 22, 1533, refers to him as alive, and a letter from the viceroy to the king dated December 10, 1537, mentions him as deceased.

Alonso married Marina Gutiérrez de la Caballería, a woman from a prominent Jewish converso family of royal treasurers from Aragon, Spain. Their children included:

- Fray Juan de Estrada, Benedictine monk and consultant of the Inquisition.
- Luis Alfonso de Estrada, lord of Picón, alderman of Ciudad Real, administrator of the household of King Philip II, and noble mayor of the "Holy Brotherhood".
- Luisa de Estrada, who married Captain Jorge de Alvarado, conquistador of Tenochtitlán, and brother of Pedro de Alvarado.
- Marina de Estrada, who married Luis de Saavedra Guzmán, "encomendero" of Tilaltongo, a son of the Counts of Castellar, and descendant of the Dukes of Medina Sidonia.
- Ana de Estrada, who married Juan Alonso de Sousa, treasurer of the New Spain after Alonso de Estrada, alderman of Mexico City, a son of Lope de Sousa de Portugal, governor of the Canary Islands, and Inés de Cabrera y Aguayo.
- Francisca de Estrada, who married Alonso de Ávalos Saavedra, conquistador of Nueva Galicia, a son of Diego López de Saavedra and María Verdugo.
- Beatriz de Estrada, who married Francisco Vázquez de Coronado, first governor and captain general of the Kingdom of Nueva Galicia. This marriage is the origin of the marquesses of Villamayor de las Ibernias.

== See also ==
- List of Viceroys of New Spain
