= Nuño de Guzmán =

Spanish conquistador and colonial administrator

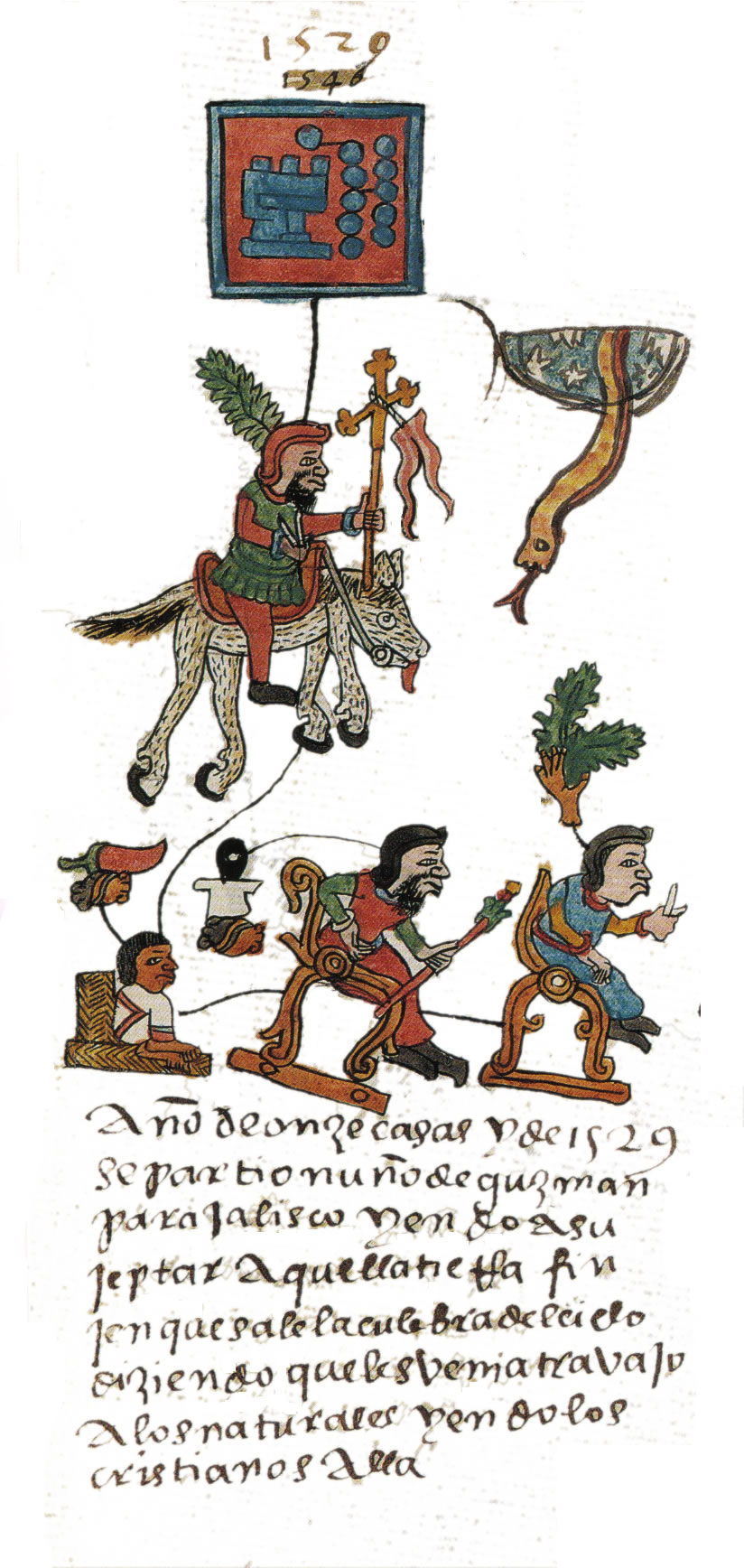
- Nuño Beltrán de Guzmán as depicted in the Codex Telleriano-Remensis

President of the Real Audiencia of Mexico
- In office 9 December 1528 – 9 January 1531
- Preceded by: Alonso de Estrada & Luis de la Torre as Governor of New Spain
- Succeeded by: Sebastián Ramírez de Fuenleal of the second Audiencia

Governor of Pánuco
- In office May 1527 – 1533

Governor of Nueva Galicia
- In office 1529–1534

Personal details
- Born: 1490 Guadalajara, Castile
- Died: 1558 (aged 67–68) Valladolid
- Parent(s): Hernán Beltrán de Guzmán and Doña Magdalena de Guzmán
- Occupation: Conquistador, colonial administrator

Nuño Beltrán de Guzmán (c. 1490 – 1558) was a Spanish conquistador and colonial administrator in New Spain. He was the governor of the province of Pánuco from 1525 to 1533 and of Nueva Galicia from 1529 to 1534, and president of the first Royal Audiencia of Mexico – the high court that governed New Spain – from 1528 to 1530. He founded several cities in Northwestern Mexico, including Guadalajara.

Originally a bodyguard of Charles I of Spain, he was sent to Mexico to counterbalance the influence of the leader of the Spanish conquest of the Aztec Empire, Hernán Cortés, since the King worried he was becoming too powerful. As Governor of Pánuco, Guzmán cracked down hard on the supporters of Cortés, stripping him and his supporters of property and rights. He conducted numerous expeditions of conquest into the northwestern areas of Mexico, enslaving thousands of Indians and shipping them to the Caribbean colonies. In the resulting power struggles where he also made himself an enemy of important churchmen, Guzmán came out the loser.

In 1537, he was arrested for treason, abuse of power and mistreatment of the indigenous inhabitants of his territories, and he was sent to Spain in shackles. He was eventually released, dying in poverty in 1558.

His subsequent reputation, in scholarship and popular discourse, has been that of a cruel, violent and irrational tyrant. His legacy has partly been colored by the fact that history was written largely by his political opponents such as Hernán Cortés, Juan de Zumárraga and Vasco de Quiroga.

== Early life ==
Nuño Beltrán de Guzmán was born ca. 1485 in Guadalajara, Spain, to an old noble family. His father was Hernán Beltrán de Guzmán, a wealthy merchant and a High Constable in the Spanish Inquisition; his mother was Doña Magdalena de Guzmán. The Guzmán family supported Prince Charles in the Revolt of the Comuneros and achieved gratitude of the later Emperor. Nuño Beltrán de Guzmán received some experience in law, but never finished a degree. For a period he and his younger brother served as one of 100 royal bodyguards of Carlos V, and he accompanied the Emperor on a trip to Flanders in 1522, and undertook sensitive diplomatic missions, including one dealing with the Bishop of Cuenca (Spain).

== Governorship of Pánuco ==
In 1525 the Spanish crown appointed him governor of the autonomous territory of Pánuco on the Gulf Coast in what is now northeast Mexico, arriving to take up the appointment in May 1527. He traveled with Luís Ponce de Leon and arrived in Hispaniola in 1526, but here he fell sick and did not arrive in Mexico until May 1527, immediately assuming his post. Cortés had already extended his reach into Pánuco, so that Guzmán's appointment was a direct challenge. His appointment was opposed by the Pro-Cortés faction of the struggle for power in early colonial Mexico, who viewed him as an outsider with no military experience. But he had the support of the Council of Indies and the Spanish Crown who saw him as a counterbalance to the figure of Cortés whose aspirations to power worried the King of Spain. Guzmán's appointment gave heart to Spanish conquerors who had not received what they considered sufficient rewards from Cortés's distribution of encomiendas and to Spanish settlers who had not participated in the conquest but saw their paths to position and wealth blocked by the Cortés faction.

Guzmán's rule as a governor of Pánuco was stern against Spanish rivals and brutal against the Indians. He cracked down harshly on Cortés's supporters in Pánuco, accusing some of them of disloyalty to the Crown by backing Cortés's claim to the title of viceroy. Some were stripped of their property; others were tried and executed. He also incorporated territory from adjacent provinces into the province of Pánuco. These actions brought New Spain on the verge of a civil war between Guzmán and supporters of Cortés' led by Governor of New Spain Alonso de Estrada, when Estrada sent an expedition to reclaim the lands expropriated by Guzmán. During the court case against Cortés in 1529, Guzmán accused Cortés himself of being a traitor and a rebel. Bishop Juan de Zumárraga, who had traveled with Guzmán to Hispaniola, in turn accused Guzmán of being allied with the governor of Cuba, Diego Velázquez and having been a sworn enemy of Cortés even before setting foot in New Spain.

As governor Guzmán instituted a system of Indian slave trade in Pánuco. During a raid along Río de Las Palmas in 1528 he allowed every horseman to take 20 Indian slaves and each footman 15. In 1529 he gave out individual slaving permissions amounting to more than 1000 slaves. Initially Guzmán did not allow Spaniards to sell slaves for export except in exchange for livestock, but later he gave more than 1500 slave licenses (each permitting the taking of between 15 and 50 slaves) in an eight-month period. The slaving operation in Pánuco expanded when Guzmán became President of the Royal Audiencia of Mexico and he had Indian slaves smuggled into Pánuco and shipped on to the Caribbean. Indian slaves were branded on the face. Taking Indian slaves was not explicitly outlawed in the period before 1528. Beginning in 1528, Indian slaving operations came under increased royal control but were not prohibited. The regulations of September 19, 1528, required slave owners to present proof of the legality of the taking of any slaves before branding. In 1529 the Crown began an investigation into the slaving enterprises of Guzmán.

In spite of his lack of success as governor, in 1529 he was appointed President of the First Audiencia, which the Council of the Indies and the Crown instated to check the ventures of industrious private individuals, such as Cortés, in New Spain.

== As President of the Real Audiencia ==
In the years following the conquest of Central Mexico by Hernán Cortés, New Spain had been governed by a military government, generally with the objectives of maximizing personal economic gains by the Spanish conquistadors. Hoping to establish a more orderly government, to reduce the authority of Cortés, and secure the authority of the Spanish crown in the New World, on December 13, 1527 the metropolitan government of Charles V in Burgos named the Real Audiencia de México to take over the government of the colony. This Audiencia consisted of a president and four oidores (judges). Nuño Beltrán de Guzmán was named president. His oidores were Juan Ortiz de Matienzo, Diego Delgadillo, Diego Maldonado and Alonso de Parada; these two last fell sick during the voyage to New Spain and died shortly after arrival.

At the time Guzmán was serving as governor of Pánuco, so Charles ordered the judges to assemble in Veracruz and from there make a joint entrance into the capital. The four from Spain, however, did not wait for the arrival of Guzmán, and proceeded directly to the capital. They arrived on December 8, 1528, taking over the government on the following day. They were given a splendid reception by the city government. Guzmán arrived a few days after the others.

The first bishop of Mexico, Juan de Zumárraga, had arrived in the capital only a few days before the oidores.

The instructions given to the Audiencia included a recommendation for good treatment of the indigenous people and a directive that the investigation into the conduct of Cortés and his associates Pedro de Alvarado, Alonso de Estrada, Rodrigo de Albornoz, Gonzalo de Salazar and Pedro Almíndez Chirino be concluded within 90 days. Most of these associates had participated in the government in the proceeding few years while Cortés was in Honduras, with a lot of in-fighting among themselves and injustices to the population, both Spanish and Indigenous.

Cortés himself was now in Spain, where he was defending his conduct and appealing his loss of authority to Charles. Cortés had some success with his appeal, being named Marqués del Valle de Oaxaca and receiving some other honors.

Nevertheless, Guzmán was now in charge in New Spain. Among his official acts was placing plaques bearing the royal coat of arms on the principal buildings of the capital, to stress that sovereignty resided in the king, not in Cortés. He had Pedro de Alvarado arrested for questioning the loyalty of Gonzalo de Salazar. There was already some animosity between Cortés and Guzmán, because the former had been reluctant to recognize the latter as governor of Pánuco. The later events made the two enemies.

The Audiencia also banned direct communication with the court in Spain. This was so effective that Bishop Zumárraga felt the necessity of hiding a letter sealed in wax in a cask, to be smuggled to the Spanish authorities by a confederate sailor.

In 1530, upon Hernán Cortés' return to New Spain, Guzmán was removed from the office of President of the Audiencia and instead appointed governor of Nueva Galicia. As governor of Nueva Galicia he continued his politics of violent submission of the Indians of the Gran Chichimeca and came into conflict with church authorities such as Juan de Zumárraga, the Bishop appointed as Protector of the Indians, and Bishop of Michoacán Vasco de Quiroga. He also founded several cities that still exist such as Zacatecas, Querétaro and Guadalajara. In 1531 Zumárraga published a treatise decrying Guzmán's 1529 campaign as unjust. Guzmán, who had by then made many enemies, fell out of favor with the authorities and the Second Audiencia. In 1533 he was removed from the Governorship of Pánuco and in 1534 of that of Nueva Galicia. In 1537 he was charged with treason, jailed and later expelled from New Spain.

== As conqueror of western Mexico ==
In 1529, Guzmán put Juan Ortiz de Matienzo in charge of the Audiencia. Then, gathering a military force of 300 to 400 discontented conquistadors and between 5,000 and 8,000 indigenous Nahua allies, Guzmán set out on December 21, 1529, to the west of Mexico City to conquer lands and peoples who until then had resisted the conquest. Among the officers on this expedition was Pedro Almíndez Chirino.

The campaign started with the torture and execution of the Purépecha cazonci Tangáxuan II, a powerful indigenous ally of the Spanish Crown. Guzmán proceeded to launch a fierce campaign into the Chichimec lands in the province that was to become known as Nueva Galicia, reaching as far as Culiacán. Part of the purpose of the expedition was to find the fabled Cibola, the Seven Cities of Gold.

This expedition has been described as a "genocidal enterprise". Typically, the conquistadors attacked an Indian village, stole the maize and other food, razed and burned the dwellings, and tortured the native leaders to gather information on what riches could be stolen there, or from nearby populations. For the most part, these riches did not exist.

As an example, the Spanish were received peaceably in Tzintzuntzan by Tangáxuan II, the cazonci of the Tarascan state, which largely coincides with the modern state of Michoacán. Tangáxuan gave Guzmán presents of gold and silver and supplied him with soldiers and provisions. Nevertheless, Guzmán had him arrested and tortured, to get him to reveal the location of hidden stores of gold. Presumably there was no more gold, because Tangáxuan did not reveal it under torture. Guzmán had him dragged by a horse and then burned alive on February 14, 1530.

Meanwhile, in Mexico City, the actions of the Audiencia attracted the attention of Juan de Zumárraga, bishop of Mexico, who put it under an ecclesiastical interdiction on March 7, 1530. The immediate cause of the interdiction was a case of violation of sanctuary. The Audiencia had violently taken from the convent of San Francisco a servant of Cortés accused of grave crimes, and two religious, Cristóbal de Angulo and García de Llerena.

Undeterred, Guzmán continued the violent suppression on the peoples of the present-day states of Jalisco, Zacatecas, Nayarit and Sinaloa. In the latter state, he founded the city of San Miguel de Culiacán on September 29, 1531. He returned to Tepic, where he set up his headquarters, sending out new expeditions from there. One of these founded the cities of Santiago de Galicia de Compostela and Purificación. Another traveled as far as the current Mexican state of Sonora. His violent expeditions into Chichimec lands were a main cause of the Mixtón rebellion.

== Foundation of Guadalajara in New Spain ==
In 1531 (probably January), one of Guzmán's captains, Cristóbal de Oñate, founded a small town near Nochistlán to which the name "Guadalajara" was given. Two years later Guzmán visited the city, and at the request of its inhabitants, who were fearful of Indian attacks and lacked sufficient water, he ordered it moved to Tonalá. This occurred on May 24, 1533. Later, after Guzmán had returned to Spain, it was moved again, to a site near Tlacotan (northeast of modern Zapopan). This occurred probably between October 1541 and February of the following year. Later the settlers began to complain to Antonio de Mendoza, then the viceroy of New Spain, about both the repeated relocations and Guzmán's cruelty.

== Kingdom of New Galicia ==
Nuño Beltrán de Guzmán gave the name "Conquista del Espíritu Santo de la Mayor España" to the territories he explored and conquered. However, the queen of Spain, Joanna of Castile, mother of Charles V, did not approve of the name. By a royal decree dated January 25, 1531, she supplied the name Reino de Nueva Galicia (Kingdom of New Galicia).

This territory extended from the Rio Lerma to Sonora, with its capital at Compostela. New Galicia was a separate entity, not under the authority of the Audiencia of Mexico City (but still part of New Spain).

One nineteenth-century chronicler of the Conquest referred to Beltrán de Guzmán as "the detestable governor of Pánuco and perhaps the most depraved man ever to set foot in New Spain."

== Final years in Spain ==
Reports of Guzmán's treatment of the Indigenous had reached Mexico City and Spain, and, at Bishop Zumárraga's request the Crown sent Diego Pérez de la Torre to investigate. Guzmán was arrested in 1536. He was held a prisoner for more than a year and then sent to Spain in fetters. He was released from the Castle of Torrejón prison in 1538. In 1539 he returned to his position as royal contino bodyguard - court records show him on the payroll every year from 1539 to 1561 (in 1561 as "deceased"). In 1552 he wrote up a memorial containing his own version of the events leading to his fall. In his account he justified his execution of the Purépecha Cazonci as being necessary in order to bring a Christian rule of law to the area, and he assured that: "in truth no execution more just has been carried out in all of New Spain, and if I were deserving of any punishment it would be for having doubted some days about whether to carry it out."

In 1558 he wrote his last will which was uncovered in 1973, it shows him as a poverty stricken noble struggling to save his heirs from his debts, having had even to pawn his heirlooms to pay for medicine. In it, he requested some of the property that was confiscated from him to be returned to his heirs, and wages still due to him for his years as Governor and President be paid and turned over to his heirs. With affection he bequeathed most of his belongings to a woman Sabina de Guzmán, who had taken care of him in his illness. He also bequeathed belongings to the Franciscan Order, in spite of the conflicts he had had with its members in New Spain. He probably died in Valladolid in 1558 on October 16 or shortly thereafter.

== Reputation ==
In posteriority and partly in his own time Nuño de Guzmán achieved a reputation as the worst villain of the conquistadors, in the words of his biographer Donald Chipman he has been depicted as the "personification of the Black Legend". His contemporary Bernal Díaz del Castillo described him in the following terms: "... In all the provinces of New Spain there was not another man more foul and evil than [Guzmán] of Pánuco". His biographer Santana describes his personality as characterized by "cruelty of the highest order, ambition without limit, a refined hypocrisy, great immorality, ingratitude without equal, and a fierce hatred for Cortés".
