= Pedro Almíndez Chirino =

Governor of New Spain

Governor of New Spain
- In office 29 December 1524 – 28 January 1526 Serving with Gonzalo de Salazar & Alonso de Zuazo (– 17 February 1525); Gonzalo de Salazar, Alonso de Estrada, Rodrigo de Albornoz, & Alonso de Zuazo (– 20 April 1525); Gonzalo de Salazar & Alonso de Zuazo (– 23 May 1525); Gonzalo de Salazar (– 28 January 1526)
- Preceded by: Alonso de Estrada; Rodrigo de Albornoz; Alonso de Zuazo
- Succeeded by: Alonso de Estrada; Rodrigo de Albornoz

Personal details
- Occupation: Conquistador, bureaucrat

Pedro Almíndez Chirino (or Pedro Almíndez Chirinos or Pedro Alméndez Chirinos) was a conquistador born in Úbeda and member of several councils that governed New Spain while Hernán Cortés was traveling to Honduras, in 1525–26. Almíndez was an ally of Gonzalo de Salazar; the events of this period are recounted in that article.

In 1530 he was sent by Nuño Beltrán de Guzmán to the current Mexican states of Jalisco, Aguascalientes, Zacatecas and Sinaloa to explore the region, search for gold and silver, and subdue the Indians. He passed through the current town of Lagos de Moreno, Jalisco in March 1530 with a force of 50 Spanish soldiers and 500 Purépecha and Tlaxcaltec allies. This encounter was peaceful, but he was accused of a massacre in Mocorito (Sinaloa) in 1531, and in many places of destroying and burning everything he passed. "Mocorito" in the Cahita language signifies the place of the dead. The indigenous people named it for the Indians that Pedro Almíndez Chirino killed.

== See also ==
- People from New Spain
