= Cristóbal de Olid =

Spanish conquistador

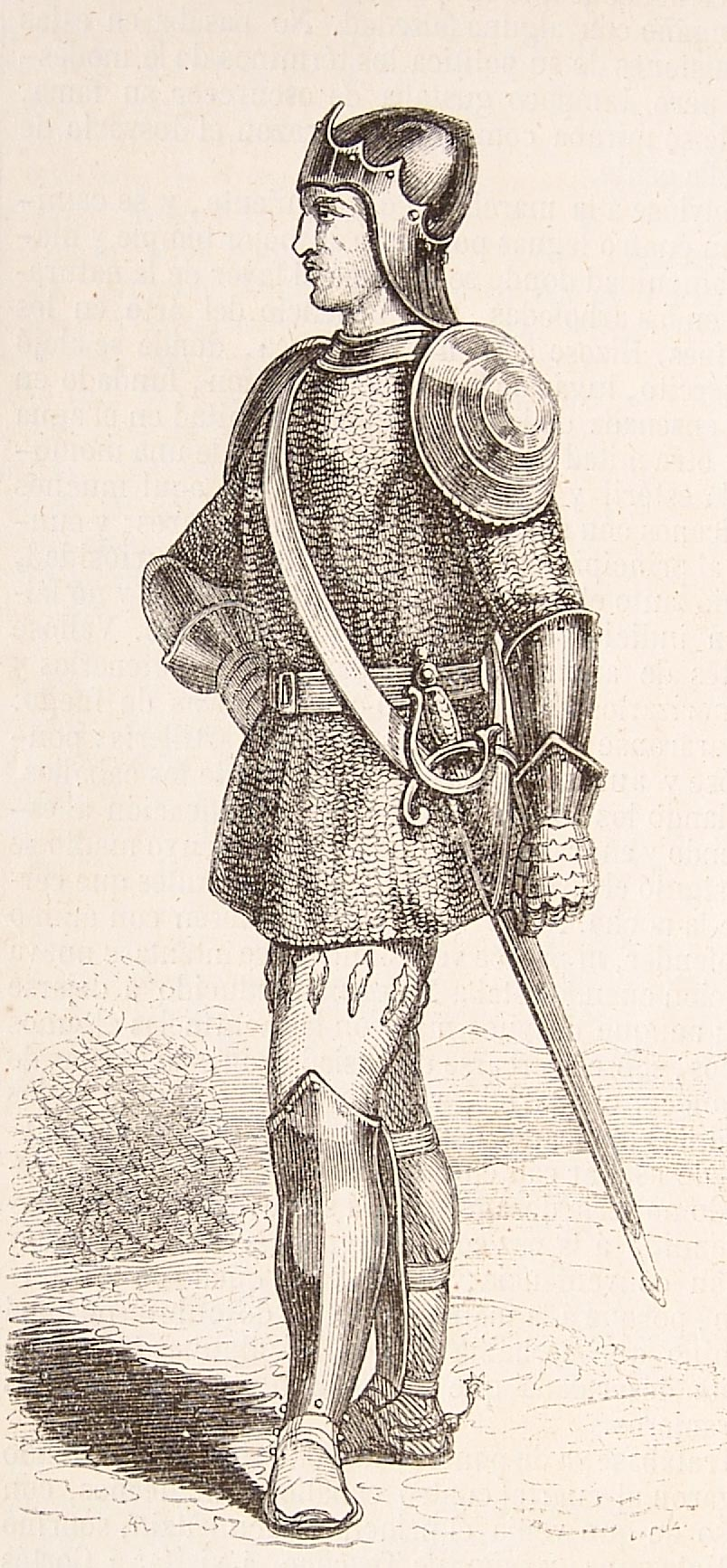
Cristóbal de Olid

Cristóbal de Olid (Spanish: [kɾisˈtoβal de oˈlið]; 1487–1524) was a Spanish adventurer, conquistador and rebel who played a part in the conquest of the Aztec Empire and present-day Honduras.

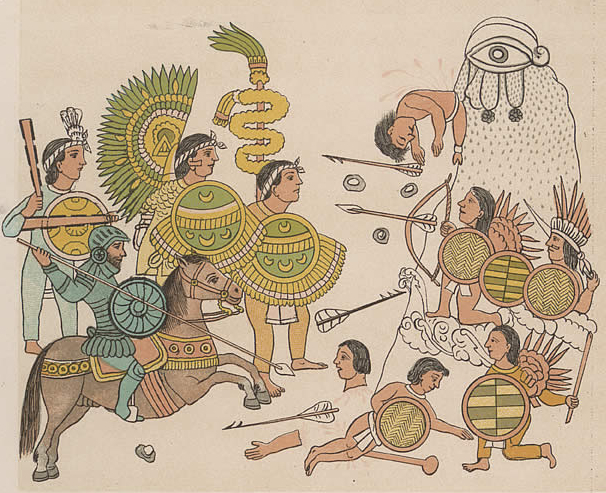
Olid leads the conquest of Jal-ixco (Jalisco), 1522. From Lienzo de Tlaxcala

Born in Baeza, Olid grew up in the household of the governor of Cuba, Diego Velázquez de Cuéllar. In 1518 Velázquez sent Olid to relieve Juan de Grijalva, but en route, a hurricane caused the loss of Olid's anchors, and he returned to Cuba. On 10 January 1519, Olid sailed with Hernán Cortés's fleet, as his quartermaster, and took an active part in the conquest of the Aztec Empire. He fought at the Battle of Otumba on 14 July 1520, and also took part in the campaign against the Purépechas.

During the Siege of Tenochtitlan, Cristóbal was one of Cortés' key captains, playing a critical role in the capture of Xochimilco. Cristobal was the Texcoco camp commander during the trial of Antonio de Villafana, for his plot to assassinate Cortés. Cristobal commanded one of four forces under Cortés, and acted as quartermaster. Olid helped save Cortés at one point, when he was seized by the Aztecs in one of the causeway battles.

Cortés sent Olid to Michoacan after he had married a Portuguese lady.

In 1522, Olid led Spanish soldiers with Tlaxcalan allies in the conquests of Jalisco and Colima in West Mexico.

In 1523, Cortés made Olid the leader of an expedition to conquer Honduras, but while resupplying in Havana, Olid (at a suggestion by Velázquez) declared his independence from New Spain and set out to conquer Honduras for himself. Landing east of Puerto Caballos, he founded the settlement of Triunfo de la Cruz. Many of Olid's supporters moved to Naco, where there was good agricultural land and gold. When Cortés learnt of Olid's rebellion, he sent Francisco de Las Casas against Olid with two warships. Even though both these ships were destroyed in a storm and many of his soldiers defected to Olid, Las Casas defeated Olid in battle and captured him.

Accounts of how Olid died vary; Bernal Díaz del Castillo asserts in his Verdadera Historia de la Conquista de Nueva España that Las Casas had him beheaded at Naco, while Antonio de Herrera y Tordesillas wrote that Olid's soldiers rose against and then murdered him.

== See also ==
- Gonzalo de Sandoval
- Pedro de Alvarado
