= Antonio de Mendoza =

1st Viceroy of New Spain, (r. 1535–50); 3rd Viceroy of Peru (r. 1551–52)

The Most Excellent Antonio de Mendoza KOS
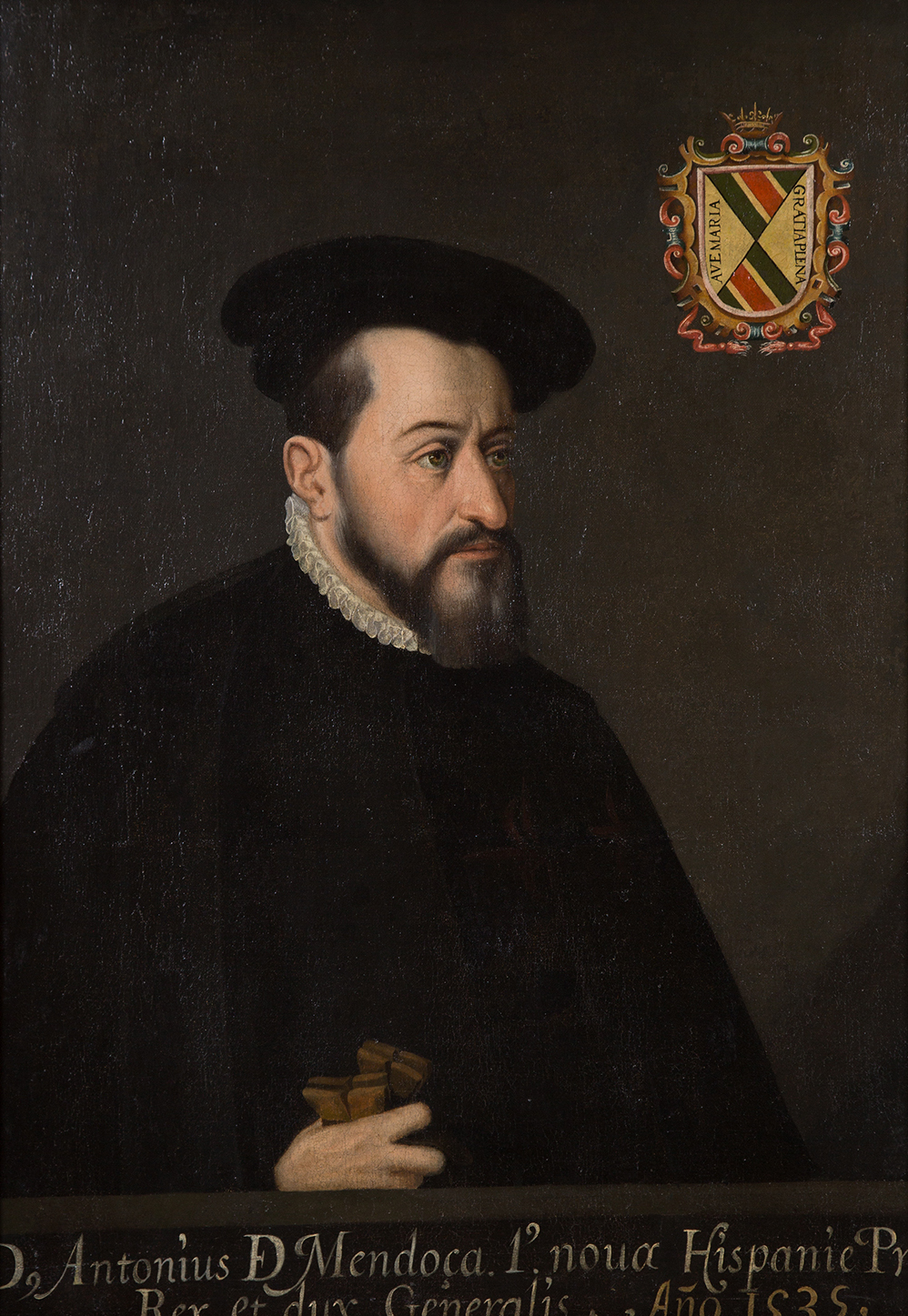

1st Viceroy of New Spain
- In office 14 November 1535 – 25 November 1550
- Monarch: Charles I of Spain
- Preceded by: Sebastián Ramírez de Fuenleal (as Governor of New Spain)
- Succeeded by: Luis de Velasco

2nd Viceroy of Peru
- In office 23 September 1551 – 21 July 1552
- Monarch: Charles I of Spain
- Preceded by: Pedro de la Gasca
- Succeeded by: Melchor Bravo de Saravia

Personal details
- Born: Antonio de Mendoza y Pacheco c. 1495 Alcalá la Real, Kingdom of Jaén, Crown of Castile
- Died: 21 July 1552 (aged 56–57) Lima, Kingdom of Peru, Crown of Castile

Antonio de Mendoza (/mɛnˈdoʊzə/; Spanish: [anˈtonjo ðe menˈdoθa]; 1495 – 21 July 1552) was a Spanish colonial administrator who was the first viceroy of New Spain, serving from 14 November 1535 to 25 November 1550, and the second viceroy of Peru, from 23 September 1551, until his death on 21 July 1552.

Mendoza was born in Alcalá la Real (Jaén, Spain), the son of the 2nd Count of Tendilla Íñigo López de Mendoza y Quiñones, and Francisca Pacheco. He was married to María Ana de Trujillo de Mendoza.

== Early life ==
Antonio de Mendoza y Pacheco was a member of the House of Mendoza, one of the leading noble families of Castile. He was the second son of Íñigo López de Mendoza y Quiñones, 2nd Count of Tendilla and 1st Marquess of Mondéjar, and his second wife, Francisca Pacheco Portocarrero.

Mendoza's siblings included Luis Hurtado de Mendoza, who succeeded their father as Count of Tendilla and Marquess of Mondéjar; Diego Hurtado de Mendoza, a diplomat and writer; Bernardino de Mendoza, a military commander and diplomat; and María Pacheco, who married Juan de Padilla and later became one of the leaders of the Revolt of the Comuneros in Toledo.

Mendoza was a Knight of Santiago and held the Encomienda of Socuéllamos. He also served as a member of the municipal government of Granada and represented Granada at the Cortes of Valladolid in 1518.

During the Revolt of the Comuneros (1520–1521), Mendoza supported the Crown and took part in royalist military operations in the Kingdom of Granada, including campaigns around Huéscar and Baza.

Mendoza subsequently entered the diplomatic service of Charles V. In 1526 he was sent to the court of Ferdinand of Habsburg in Hungary. In 1527 he represented Charles V at the Diet of Buda during the struggle over the Hungarian succession and was present at Ferdinand's coronation at Székesfehérvár. Mendoza subsequently travelled to Italy and Germany and was present at Charles V's imperial coronation in Bologna in 1530. In 1532 he joined Charles V's forces during the campaign against Suleiman the Magnificent and the Ottoman army in Central Europe.

Mendoza was selected in 1529 to become the first Viceroy of New Spain, although he did not take up the office until 1535.

== Viceroy of New Spain ==
On 17 April 1535, in Barcelona, Spain the royal commissions named Mendoza the Viceroy of New Spain. Because Mendoza came from an old and influential family, he immediately gained respect as a member of nobility. Additionally, he was placed in the inner circle of the Empress and was well known in the court. He governed for 15 years which was longer than any subsequent viceroy. On his arrival in New Spain, he found a recently conquered territory beset with Indigenous unrest and rivalry among the Spanish conquerors and Spanish settlers. Throughout his time as a viceroy he would stand in place of the king for all branches of the government. Furthermore, Mendoza was the highest colonial official in both of the Americas making him very influential. His difficult assignment was to govern in the king's name without making an enemy of Hernán Cortés. Cortés himself had expected to be made the permanent ruling crown official of New Spain, since he had led the Spanish conquest of the Aztec Empire. The Emperor Charles V (King Charles I of Spain) and the Council of the Indies judged Cortés too independent of crown authority to be made viceroy and had created a high court (audiencia) in New Spain in 1528, appointing Nuño de Guzmán, a rival of Cortés as its president to counter Cortés's power. In 1530 the crown granted Cortés the title of the Marquis of the Valley of Oaxaca with multiple encomiendas. With the arrival of Viceroy Mendoza in 1535, Cortés pursued his own economic interests from his palace in Cuernavaca.

Although the Spanish had occupied and expanded explorations, conquest, and settlement in the Caribbean, it was not until the conquest of central Mexico that the crown appointed a viceroy (vice king), who would be the king's living image in Mexico and envisioned to effectively assert royal authority in the Kingdom of New Spain. To further cement his authority and establish a solid society he established marital alliances with powerful settlers committed to the development of New Spain, such as Marina de la Caballería. Mendoza's status as a noble and his family's loyalty to the Spanish crown made him a suitable candidate for appointment.

Don Antonio and Bishop Juan de Zumárraga were key in the formation of two institutions of Mexico: the Colegio de Santa Cruz at Tlatelolco (1536), where the sons of Aztec nobles studied Latin, rhetoric, philosophy and music, and the Royal and Pontifical University of Mexico (1552), modeled on the University of Salamanca, which trained young men for the Catholic Church. These institutions were the first and second universities respectively to be established in the mainland of the Americas. In 1536 he began the minting of silver and copper coins, known as macuquinas. Also under his instructions, the first printing press in the New World was brought to Mexico in 1539, by printer Juan Pablos (Giovanni Paoli). The first book printed in Mexico: La Escala Espiritual de San Juan Clímaco. On 18 May 1541 don Antonio founded the city of Valladolid (now Morelia, Michoacán).

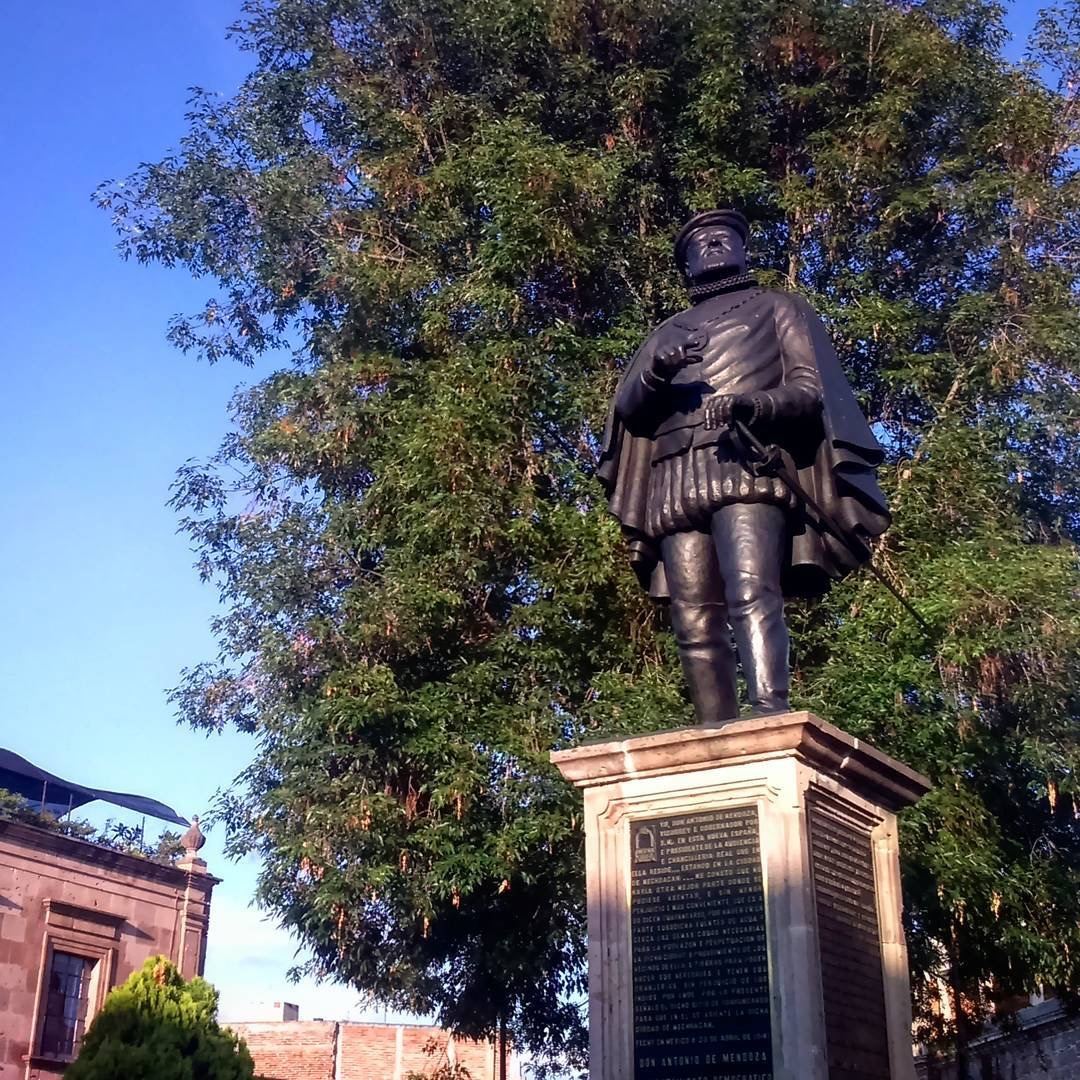
Monument to Viceroy Mendoza in Morelia, Mexico; featuring a bronze transcription of the city's founding decree.

When the Spanish crown issued the New Laws that put restrictions on the grants of elite conquerors awarded grants of labor encomenderos, the viceroy prudently refrained from implementing the most draconian aspects of the edicts, which no longer permitted an encomendero family holding the grant in perpetuity. In Peru, the implementation of the New Laws resulted in outright rebellion and the assassination of the viceroy. In reaction to the crisis caused by the New Laws, Mendoza introduced the policy of obedezco pero no cumplo ("I obey but do not comply"), which means "I respect the authority of the crown, but in my judgment I do not implement particular legislation." He tried to not implement the New Laws, and therefore stabilized the region.

In 1542 an insurrection of the Indians, called the Mixtón Rebellion threatened to push the Spaniards out of northwestern Mexico, bringing the area under indigenous control. The Viceroy himself had to take the field and bring all disposable manpower. The rebellion was quashed and the surviving Indians were harshly punished. By the viceroy's order men, women and children were seized and executed, some by cannon fire, some torn apart by dogs, and others stabbed. In 1548 he suppressed an uprising of the Zapotecs.

As viceroy, Mendoza commissioned the expedition of Francisco Vásquez de Coronado to explore and establish settlements in the northern lands of New Spain in 1540–42, the expedition of Juan Rodríguez Cabrillo to explore the western coastline of Alta California in 1542–43, and the expedition of Ruy López de Villalobos to the Philippines in 1542–43. The Codex Mendoza created by the order of Mendoza, and subsequently named for him.

During his term of office, Mendoza is credited with consolidating the sovereignty of the Crown throughout the Spanish conquests in New Spain and limiting the power and ambition of the first conquistadors. Many of the political and economic policies he established endured throughout the entire colonial period. He promoted the construction of hospitals and schools and encouraged improvements in agriculture, ranching and mining. His administration did much to bring stability and peace to New Spain.

He was succeeded as viceroy of New Spain by Don Luís de Velasco. It is reported that his advice to his successor was: "Do little and do that slowly."

== Viceroy of Peru ==
On 4 July 1549 in Brussels, Emperor Charles V named Mendoza viceroy of Peru. He traveled overland from Mexico to Panama, and then by boat to Peru. He arrived and took up his new office on 25 November 1550. However, he soon became ill, and died in 1552. His tomb is in the Cathedral of Lima, along with that of the Spanish conqueror of Peru, Francisco Pizarro.

Cape Mendocino in Humboldt County, California was named in his honor in 1565. From the cape, Mendocino County, the town of Mendocino, and Mendocino National Forest were named in the 19th and 20th centuries.

== Notes ==
Government offices
| Preceded by Newly Established | Viceroy of New Spain; 1535–1549 | Succeeded by Luís de Velasco |
| Preceded by Pedro de la Gasca | Viceroy of Peru; 1550–1551 | Succeeded by Melchor Bravo de Saravia |
