= Gonzalo de Salazar =

Governor of New Spain

Governor of New Spain
- In office 29 December 1524 – 28 January 1526 Serving with Pedro Almíndez Chirino & Alonso de Zuazo (– 17 February 1525); Pedro Almíndez Chirino, Alonso de Estrada, Rodrigo de Albornoz, & Alonso de Zuazo (– 20 April 1525); Pedro Almíndez Chirino & Alonso de Zuazo (– 23 May 1525); Pedro Almíndez Chirino (– 28 January 1526)
- Preceded by: Alonso de Estrada; Rodrigo de Albornoz; Alonso de Zuazo
- Succeeded by: Alonso de Estrada; Rodrigo de Albornoz

Personal details
- Born: Granada, Castile
- Died: c. 1564 New Spain
- Spouse: Catarina (aka Catalina) de la Cadena Maluenda
- Children: Catalina de Salazar de la Cadena
- Occupation: Bureaucrat

Gonzalo de Salazar (Granada, Castile – c. 1564, New Spain) was an aristocrat, and leader of several councils that governed New Spain while Hernán Cortés was traveling to Honduras, in 1525−26.

== Early life ==
Though born into a family which was originally Jewish, Gonzalo was the first child baptized to the Christian faith in Granada after its reconquest from the Moors. Consequently, he was granted titles, special privileges, and at an early age, appointed royal page to the Catholic Monarchs at court in Granada, despite his otherwise New Christian pedigree. He fought in the Castilian War of the Communities, opposing the rebels against Emperor Charles V. For this, Charles rewarded him with the position of factor (tax collector), and Captain General (see below) of New Spain from 29 December 1524, until 29 January 1526.

Prior to the appointment of a Viceroy in New Spain, Gonzalo had worked, alongside Pedro Almíndez Chirino, Alonso de Estrada (who preceded him, and succeeded him—they were on bad terms), and others, and endured power struggles and controversy. Gonzalo's father, Doctor Guadalupe de Salazar, a Sephardic Jewish converso to Catholicism, was royal physician, to the Catholic monarchs, and one of 16 regidores (administrators) of Granada during the struggle to oust the Moors.

Gonzalo, his wife Catalina, and her brother Antonio de La Cadena Maluenda (treasurer of New Spain), left Spain in 1524, and arrived in Mexico City in 1525. A powerful member of the ruling class in the New World, Gonzalo, became an encomendero (holder of an encomienda) of Tajimaroa (Michoacán), and held lands, and titles elsewhere.

His daughter Catalina de Salazar de la Cadena first married Ruy de Mendoza, of the famous Mendoza clan, and subsequently wed Cristóbal de Oñate. Their son, Juan de Oñate, established San Juan de Los Caballeros near present-day Santa Fe, New Mexico in 1598. Gonzalo's son Juan Velázquez de Salazar, inherited his estates. Gonzalo had a brother named Juan Salazar Velázquez. Gonzalo Salazar's wife, Catarina (aka Catalina) de la Cadena Maluenda, was descended from Mossen Truchas de Calatayud. Originally also a Jewish family surnamed Ha-Levi, they assumed the surname Maluenda after the town where they lived. They had been money lenders to kings, and prominent spice and silk merchants in Europe for hundreds of years. Pedro de Maluenda was commissary for Hernán Cortés; witnessed the destruction of the Aztec Empire, but died of a fever 6 months after the conquest.

The Spanish colonial families were inter-related, of Christian, Sephardic (converso), or Jewish descent. The title "Captain General" precedes the appointment of "Viceroys" by the Spanish kings in the new world.

== Temporary government in the absence of Cortés ==
In 1524 Governor and Captain General Cortés left Mexico City for Honduras. He put the government in charge of Alonso de Estrada, royal treasurer of the colony appointed by Charles, Rodrigo de Albornoz and Licenciado Alonso de Zuazo, with Estrada at the head. The transfer of power occurred October 12, 1524.

When Cortés left Mexico City he was accompanied by Gonzalo de Salazar and Pedro Almíndez Chirino as far as Coatzacoalcos. Salazar and Almíndez used this opportunity to convince the conqueror that they should be included in the government. Cortés sent them back with two decrees. The first decree directed that they join the already-formed government of Estrada, Albornoz and Zuazo as its fourth and fifth members, provided that the two groups could reconcile their differences. The second decree directed that Salazar and Almíndez replace Estrada and Albornoz.

== Government of Salazar and Almíndez ==
When Salazar and Almíndez arrived back in the capital, they suppressed the first of these decrees, and made known only the second one, thus taking over the government. This took place on December 29, 1524. However, they made the mistake of admitting the deception to some friends. This resulted in a scandal, and on February 17, 1525, Estrada and Albornoz were admitted to the government, which now included all five men mentioned by Cortés. In order of importance, these were Salazar (tax collector), Almíndez (inspector), Estrada (treasurer), Albornoz (accountant) and Zuazo (justicia mayor).

The expanded governing council was the work of Zuazo, acting as an arbitrator based on the first decree received from Cortés. The two factions, however, were not really reconciled. Estrada and Albornoz objected to the arrangement. On April 20, 1525, Salazar and Almíndez proclaimed that no officials were to recognize the authority of Estrada and Albornoz, on pain of 100 lashes and confiscation of property. This proclamation was signed by Zuazo, Cervantes, de la Torre, Sotomayor, Rodrigo de Paz (a member of the ayuntamiento, or city government), and the clerk Pérez. Estrada and Albornoz left Mexico City to seek out Cortés and present their case to him.

== Despotism ==
The council continued with three members (Zuazo was still a member) until April 20, 1525. In the middle of the night, Zuazo was arrested in his home and taken under guard to be sent back to Spain. He went as far as Santo Domingo, where he spent the rest of his life, and died in 1527.

Zuazo was a respectable, educated man, a friend of Cortés, and apparently incorruptible. His arrest freed Salazar and Almíndez from all checks on their authority, and they began to govern despotically. They made it known that Cortés (untruthfully) had been killed by Indians. On August 19, 1525, they tried to confiscate his property. They arrested Rodrigo de Paz, whom Cortés had left as majordomo of his property. Paz was tortured to find out the location of Cortés's hidden treasure. He provided some locations, and then was hanged in the plaza.

Salazar sent out agents to extort treasures. When refugees were forced to leave a church, Father Valencia protested the violation of sanctuary by excommunicating Mexico City until the prisoners were restored.

== Overthrow ==
On 28 January 1526, a messenger (Martín de Orantes a.k.a. Dorantes), arrived at the Franciscan monastery in Mexico City to announce the imminent return of Cortés. He carried with him despatches from Cortés ordering the replacement of Salazar and Almíndez in the governing triumvirate, with Francisco de las Casas and Pedro de Alvarado taking command, or in their absence, Estrada & Albornoz.

Estrada & Albornoz arrived that afternoon at the monastery, along with Tapia & Alvarado. Having heard the news, they sent word to their closest supporters to come to the convent, and to come armed. On the night of 28/29 January, Alvarado led the assembled party through the city in moonlight, calling on all of Cortes’ supporters to join them at the monastery.

At daybreak on January 29, 1526, Tapia read out Cortes’ despatches to the gathered crowd. The appointment of Estrada was met with popular acclaim, less so in regards to Albornoz (who had been witnessed leaving Salazar's house before attending the meeting, no doubt to warn him of what was afoot).

A crowd of about 500 strong, led by Tapia & Alvarado, accompanied Estrada & Albornoz to Salazar's house, which was by now protected by cannon & 200 men, to demand his resignation. Salazar at first tried to brazen it out, but after he fired off a cannon shot that failed to disperse the crowd, his house was stormed.

Salazar was quickly arrested and dragged in chains through the streets to be caged on public display in the Zocalo. Almíndez was taken from the unfinished Franciscan monastery in Tlaxcala where he had claimed sanctuary (unsuccessfully, since the monastery was still a building site) and brought back to the city to suffer the same fate. Salazar was not released till at least Easter, but Almíndez was not long after returned to the monastery.

With De Las Casas and Alvarado absent, Estrada and Albornoz governed from January 29 to June 24, 1526. Cortés himself returned on June 19, but did not resume office, due to the arrival on June 25 of Luis Ponce de Léon, the governor newly sent over from Spain.

== Afterwards ==
Salazar and Almíndez escaped the fate of many of their enemies because of their royal connections. Salazar escaped execution due to his status. In June a new administration was formed.

Despite the court intrigue, and plots, Salazar returned to the Spanish court, was reappointed, and returned to New Spain in 1540. He completed his position as factor in New Spain without issue. Salazar behaved as if nothing had happened. Dubbed "el gordo" behind his back, he was overly courteous and courtly. A sinister persona, he left politics thereafter, and lived comfortably until his death probably in 1564.

== See also ==
- List of Viceroys of New Spain
