= Francisco de las Casas =

- Born: 1461; Trujillo, Spain
- Died: 1536 (aged 74–75); Spain
- Spouse: María de Aguilar
- Children: Gonzalo de las Casas
- Relatives: Hernán Cortés (cousin by marriage)
- Military career
- Allegiance: Crown of Castile
- Branch: Spanish colonial forces
- Rank: Captain
- Commands: Expedition to Honduras (1524)
- Conflicts: Conquest of Mexico, Honduras campaign
- Other work: Alcalde Mayor of Mexico City (1524), Governor of Honduras (briefly, 1525)

Francisco de las Casas y Saavedra (1461–1536) was a Spanish conquistador in what is now Mexico and Honduras.

Francisco de las Casas was born in Trujillo, Spain. By 1513 las Casas was married to Maria de Aguilar, and they maintained a house in Trujillo, where she sold a block of land in Trujillo that she owned. They had a son, Gonzalo. Cortés refers to Francisco de las Casas as "mi primo" (Spanish for 'my cousin') in his fifth letter to the Spanish Crown. Maria is also Cortés' cousin.

== In the service of Hernán Cortés ==
In October 1522, King Carlos wrote, appointing Hernan Cortés as governor of New Spain. Francisco de las Casas, along with Rodrigo de Paz brought this news from Spain to Mexico, by way of Cuba, where they stopped to notify Cortés's political enemy Diego Velázquez de Cuéllar. They arrived in Mexico City in 1523 and their news was a cause for celebration. Cortés rewarded Francisco de las Casas by appointing him a Captain, and giving him the town of Yanhuitlan in encomienda. Francisco was elected Alcalde Mayor of Mexico City in 1524.

== The colony of Honduras ==
In January 1524, Cortés directed captain Cristóbal de Olid to establish a colony for him in Honduras. Olid sailed with a force of several ships and over 400 soldiers and colonists. He sailed first to Cuba, to pick up supplies Cortés had arranged for him, where Governor Velázquez convinced him to go and claim the colony he was to found as his own. Olid sailed from Cuba to the coast of Honduras, coming ashore at Triunfo de la Cruz where he initially settled and declared himself governor.

Hernán Cortés, however, in 1524, got word of Olid's insurrection and sent his cousin, Francisco de las Casas, along with several ships to Honduras to remove Olid and claim the area for Cortés. Las Casas, however, lost most of his fleet in a series of storms along the coast of Belize and Honduras. His ships limped into the bay at Trujillo, where Olid had established his headquarters.

When Las Casas arrived at Olid's headquarters, a large part of Olid's army was inland, dealing with another threat from a party of Spaniards under Gil González Dávila. Nevertheless, Olid decided to launch an attack with two caravels. Las Casas returned fire and sent boarding parties which captured Olid's ships. Under the circumstances, Olid proposed a truce to which Las Casas agreed, and he did not land his forces. During the night, a fierce storm destroyed his fleet and about a third of his men were lost. The remainder were taken prisoner after two days of exposure and without food. After being forced to swear loyalty to Olid, they were released. However, Las Casas was kept a prisoner, soon to be joined by González, who had been captured by Olid's inland force.

The Spanish record two different stories about what happened next. In one version, Olid's men rebel and swear allegiance to las Casas, and Olid is tried and beheaded in Trujillo. In another version, Olid escapes and hides in Naco, where las Casas finds him, and kills him in a knife fight.

In the meantime, Cortés had marched overland from Mexico to Honduras, arriving in 1525. Cortés ordered the founding of two cities, Nuestra Señora de la Navidad, near modern Puerto Cortés, and Trujillo, and named Francisco de las Casas Governor. However, both las Casas and Cortés sailed back to Mexico before the end of 1525, where Francisco was arrested and sent back to Spain as a prisoner by Estrada and Alboronoz. Francisco returned to Mexico in 1527, and returned again to Spain with Cortés in 1528.

== Settling down and growing old ==
In Yanhuitlan, Cortés is credited with giving Maria de Aguilar, Francisco's wife, the mulberry seeds for starting the silk industry for which Yanhuitlan became famous in the colonial period. In 1567, Francisco hired the painter Andres de Concha to paint the images on the retablo in the church at Yanhuitlan, Oaxaca, his encomienda.
