= List of development ministers of Spain =

This is a list of ministers of development of Spain, also known as ministers of public works and, more recently, as ministers of transport.

== Introduction ==
Before 1847, it was the minister of the interior (at that time known as minister of the governance), the Cabinet-member responsible for everything regarding public works, hydric resources, trade, education, culture and agriculture, among others. In 1847, a new government department was established to assumed all these competences, the Ministry of Trade, Public Instruction and Public Works.

This department was renamed as Ministry of Development in 1851 and has been the origin of many other departments, as many of its responsibilities have been established as independent departments. Currently, the ministry focuses on the regulation of transport and transport infrastructure, and is known as the "Ministry of Transport".

== List of ministers ==
Name	Start	End	Duration	Party	Government		Ref.
The Marquess of Molins (1812–1889)	28 January 1847	28 March 1847	59 days	Moderate	The Marquess of Casa Irujo	Isabella II (1833–1868)	
Nicomedes Pastor Díaz y Corbelle (1811–1863)	28 March 1847	31 August 1847	156 days	Moderate	Joaquín Francisco Pacheco	Isabella II (1833–1868)	
The Marquess of Guad-el-Jelú (1808–1886)	31 August 1847	3 November 1847	64 days	Moderate	Florencio García Goyena	Isabella II (1833–1868)	
The Marquess of Guad-el-Jelú (1808–1886)	31 August 1847	3 November 1847	64 days	Moderate	The Duke of Valencia	Isabella II (1833–1868)	
The Count of San Luis (1820–1871) acting minister	3 November 1847	10 November 1847	7 days	Moderate	The Duke of Valencia	Isabella II (1833–1868)	
Juan Bravo Murillo (1803–1873)	10 November 1847	31 August 1848	77 days	Moderate	The Duke of Valencia	Isabella II (1833–1868)	
Manuel Seijas Lozano (Note: Acting until the absences of the Minister: Juan Bravo Murillo, Minister of Finance (31 August – 13 September 1849).) (1800–1868)	31 August 1848	19 August 1849	353 days	Moderate	The Duke of Valencia	Isabella II (1833–1868)	
Trinidad Balboa (1789–1853) acting minister	19 October 1849	20 October 1849	1 day	Moderate	The Count of Clonard	Isabella II (1833–1868)	
Manuel Seijas Lozano (1800–1868)	20 October 1849	29 November 1850	1 year, 40 days	Moderate	The Duke of Valencia	Isabella II (1833–1868)	
Saturnino Calderón Collantes (1799–1864)	29 November 1850	14 January 1851	46 days	Moderate	The Duke of Valencia	Isabella II (1833–1868)	
Santiago Fernández Negrete (1799–1869)	14 January 1851	5 April 1851	81 days	Moderate	Juan Bravo Murillo	Isabella II (1833–1868)	
Fermín de Arteta Sesma (1796–1880)	5 April 1851	20 October 1851	198 days	Moderate	Juan Bravo Murillo	Isabella II (1833–1868)	
Mariano Miguel de Reynoso (Note: Acting until the absences of the Minister: Manuel Bertrán de Lis y Ribes, Minister of State (26 April – 7 May 1852).) (1799–1863)	20 October 1851	15 November 1852	1 year, 26 days	Moderate	Juan Bravo Murillo	Isabella II (1833–1868)	
Manuel Bertrán de Lis y Ribes (1806–1869)	15 November 1852	14 December 1852	29 days	Moderate	Juan Bravo Murillo	Isabella II (1833–1868)	
The Count of Marisol (1794–1863) acting minister	14 December 1852	19 February 1853	67 days	Moderate	The Count of Alcoy	Isabella II (1833–1868)	
Antonio de Benavides y Fernández de Navarrete (1807–1884) acting minister	19 February 1853	14 April 1853	54 days	Moderate	The Count of Alcoy	Isabella II (1833–1868)	
Pablo Govantes (1785–1865) acting minister	14 April 1853	21 June 1853	68 days	Moderate	Francisco de Lersundi y Hormaechea	Isabella II (1833–1868)	
Claudio Moyano (1809–1890)	21 June 1853	1 August 1853	41 days	Moderate	Francisco de Lersundi y Hormaechea	Isabella II (1833–1868)	
Agustín Esteban Collantes (1815–1876)	1 August 1853	17 July 1854	350 days	Moderate	Francisco de Lersundi y Hormaechea	Isabella II (1833–1868)	
Agustín Esteban Collantes (1815–1876)	1 August 1853	17 July 1854	350 days	Moderate	The Count of San Luis	Isabella II (1833–1868)	
Miguel de Roda (1808–1864)	18 July 1854	30 July 1854	12 days	Moderate	The Duke of Rivas	Isabella II (1833–1868)	
Miguel de Roda (1808–1864)	18 July 1854	30 July 1854	12 days	Moderate	The Prince of Vergara	Isabella II (1833–1868)	
Francisco de Luján y Miguel-Romero (Note: Acting during the absences of the Minister: José Félix Allende-Salazar Mazarredo, Minister of the Navy (30 July – 5 August 1854).) (1798–1867)	30 July 1854	6 June 1855	311 days	Progressive	The Prince of Vergara	Isabella II (1833–1868)	
Manuel Alonso Martínez (1827–1891)	6 June 1855	15 January 1856	223 days	Progressive	The Prince of Vergara	Isabella II (1833–1868)	
Francisco de Luján y Miguel-Romero (Note: Acting during the absences of the Minister: Patricio de la Escosura, Minister of the Governance (23 April – 16 May 1856).) (1798–1867)	15 January 1856	14 July 1856	181 days	Progressive	The Prince of Vergara	Isabella II (1833–1868)	
The Marquess of the Laguna (1792–1864)	14 July 1856	12 October 1856	90 days	Liberal Unionist	The Duke of Tetuán	Isabella II (1833–1868)	
Claudio Moyano (1809–1890)	12 October 1856	15 October 1857	1 year, 3 days	Moderate	The Duke of Valencia	Isabella II (1833–1868)	
Eugenio de Ochoa (1815–1872) acting minister	15 October 1857	25 October 1857	10 days	Moderate	The Marquess of Nervión	Isabella II (1833–1868)	
Pedro Salaverría (1821–1896)	25 October 1857	14 January 1858	81 days	Independent	The Marquess of Nervión	Isabella II (1833–1868)	
Ventura Díaz Astillero de los Ríos (1808–1864) acting minister	14 January 1858	15 January 1858	1 day	Moderate	Francisco Javier de Istúriz	Isabella II (1833–1868)	
The Count of Guenduláin (1799–1882)	15 January 1858	30 June 1858	166 days	Moderate	Francisco Javier de Istúriz	Isabella II (1833–1868)	
The Marquess of Corvera (1807–1894)	30 June 1858	21 November 1861	3 years, 144 days	Liberal Unionist	The Duke of Tetuán	Isabella II (1833–1868)	
José Posada Herrera (1814–1885) acting minister	21 November 1861	18 December 1861	27 days	Liberal Unionist	The Duke of Tetuán	Isabella II (1833–1868)	
The Marquess of Vega de Armijo (1824–1908)	18 December 1861	17 January 1863	1 year, 30 days	Liberal Unionist	The Duke of Tetuán	Isabella II (1833–1868)	
Francisco de Luján y Miguel-Romero (1798–1867)	17 January 1863	2 March 1863	44 days	Liberal Unionist	The Duke of Tetuán	Isabella II (1833–1868)	
Manuel Moreno López (1815–1868)	3 March 1863	4 August 1863	154 days	Moderate	The Marquess of Miraflores	Isabella II (1833–1868)	
Manuel Alonso Martínez (1827–1891)	4 August 1863	17 January 1864	166 days	Liberal Unionist	The Marquess of Miraflores	Isabella II (1833–1868)	
Claudio Moyano (1809–1890)	17 January 1864	1 March 1864	44 days	Moderate	Lorenzo Arrazola	Isabella II (1833–1868)	
Augusto Ulloa y Castañón (1823–1879)	1 March 1864	16 September 1864	199 days	Liberal Unionist	Alejandro Mon y Menéndez	Isabella II (1833–1868)	
Antonio Alcalá Galiano (1789–1865)	16 September 1864	16 April 1865	212 days	Moderate	The Duke of Valencia	Isabella II (1833–1868)	
The Marquess of Orovio (1817–1883)	16 April 1865	21 June 1865	66 days	Moderate	The Duke of Valencia	Isabella II (1833–1868)	
The Marquess of Vega de Armijo (1824–1908)	21 June 1865	10 July 1866	1 year, 19 days	Liberal Unionist	The Duke of Tetuán	Isabella II (1833–1868)	
The Marquess of Orovio (1817–1883)	10 July 1866	23 April 1868	1 year, 288 days	Moderate	The Duke of Valencia†	Isabella II (1833–1868)	
Severo Catalina del Amo (Note: Acting during the absences of the Minister: Manuel Orovio Echagüe, Marquess of Orovio, Minister of Finance (2 August – 3 September 1868).) (1832–1871)	23 April 1868	20 September 1868	150 days	Moderate	Luis González Bravo	Isabella II (1833–1868)	
Severo Catalina del Amo (1832–1871)	23 April 1868	20 September 1868	150 days	Moderate	The Marquess of Havana	Isabella II (1833–1868)	
Juan Cavero y Llera (?–1883) acting minister	20 September 1868	8 October 1868	18 days	Moderate	The Marquess of Havana	Isabella II (1833–1868)	
Manuel Ruiz Zorrilla (1833–1895)	8 October 1868	13 July 1869	278 days	Progressive	The Duke of the Tower	The Duke of the Tower (regent) (1869–1871)	
Manuel Ruiz Zorrilla (1833–1895)	8 October 1868	13 July 1869	278 days	Progressive	The Marquess of Castillejos	The Duke of the Tower (regent) (1869–1871)	
José Echegaray (1832–1916)	13 July 1869	4 January 1871	1 year, 175 days	Progressive	The Marquess of Castillejos	The Duke of the Tower (regent) (1869–1871)	
José Echegaray (1832–1916)	13 July 1869	4 January 1871	1 year, 175 days	Progressive	Juan Bautista Topete	The Duke of the Tower (regent) (1869–1871)	
Manuel Ruiz Zorrilla (Note: Acting during the absences of the Minister: Práxedes Mateo Sagasta, Minister of the Governance (23 May – 25 June 1871).) (1833–1895)	4 January 1871	24 July 1871	201 days	Progressive	The Duke of the Tower	Amadeo I (1871–1873)	
Manuel Ruiz Zorrilla (1833–1895)	4 January 1871	24 July 1871	201 days	Radical-Democrat	The Duke of the Tower	Amadeo I (1871–1873)	
Santiago Diego-Madrazo (1816–1890)	24 July 1871	5 October 1871	73 days	Progressive	Manuel Ruiz Zorrilla	Amadeo I (1871–1873)	
Telesforo Montejo Robledo (1818–1896)	5 October 1871	21 December 1871	77 days	Constitutionalist	The Marquess of San Rafael	Amadeo I (1871–1873)	
Alejandro Groizard y Gómez de la Serna (1830–1919)	21 December 1871	20 February 1872	61 days	Constitutionalist	Práxedes Mateo Sagasta	Amadeo I (1871–1873)	
Francisco Romero Robledo (1838–1906)	20 February 1872	26 May 1872	96 days	Constitutionalist	Práxedes Mateo Sagasta	Amadeo I (1871–1873)	
Víctor Balaguer i Cirera (1824–1901)	26 May 1872	13 June 1872	18 days	Constitutionalist	The Duke of the Tower	Amadeo I (1871–1873)	
José Echegaray (1832–1916)	13 June 1872	19 December 1872	189 days	Radical-Democrat	Manuel Ruiz Zorrilla	Amadeo I (1871–1873)	
Manuel Becerra Bermúdez (1820–1896)	19 December 1872	24 February 1873	67 days	Radical-Democrat	Manuel Ruiz Zorrilla	Amadeo I (1871–1873)	
Manuel Becerra Bermúdez (1820–1896)	19 December 1872	24 February 1873	67 days	Radical-Democrat	Estanislao Figueras	List of presidents of the First Republic	
Eduardo Chao Fernández (1822–1887)	24 February 1873	11 June 1873	107 days	Federal Republican	Estanislao Figueras	List of presidents of the First Republic	
Eduardo Benot (1822–1907)	11 June 1873	28 June 1873	17 days	Federal Republican	Francisco Pi y Margall	List of presidents of the First Republic	
Ramón Pérez Costales (1832–1911)	28 June 1873	18 July 1873	20 days	Federal Republican	Francisco Pi y Margall	List of presidents of the First Republic	
José Fernando González (1836–1915)	19 July 1873	8 September 1873	51 days	Federal Republican	Nicolás Salmerón	List of presidents of the First Republic	
Joaquín Gil Berges (1834–1920)	8 September 1873	3 January 1874	117 days	Federal Republican	Emilio Castelar	List of presidents of the First Republic	
Víctor Balaguer i Cirera (1824–1901) acting minister	3 January 1874	4 January 1874	1 day	Constitutionalist	The Duke of the Tower	List of presidents of the First Republic	
Tomás Mosquera García (1823–1890)	4 January 1874	13 May 1874	129 days	Radical-Democrat	The Duke of the Tower	List of presidents of the First Republic	
Eduardo Alonso Colmenares (1820–1888)	13 May 1874	31 December 1874	113 days	Constitutionalist	The Marquess of Sierra Bullones	List of presidents of the First Republic	
Carlos Navarro Rodrigo (1820–1888)	3 September 1874	31 December 1874	119 days	Constitutionalist	Práxedes Mateo Sagasta	List of presidents of the First Republic	
The Marquess of Orovio (Note: Acting during the absences of the Minister: Alejandro de Castro y Casal, Minister of State (18 January – 4 February 1875).) (1817–1883)	31 December 1874	12 September 1875	255 days	Conservative	Antonio Cánovas del Castillo	Alfonso XII (1874–1885)	
Cristóbal Martín de Herrera (1831–1878)	12 September 1875	2 December 1875	81 days	Conservative	Joaquín Jovellar y Soler	Alfonso XII (1874–1885)	
The Count of Toreno (Note: Acting during the absences of the Minister: Salvador Albacete y Albert, Minister of Overseas (27 July – 31 August 1879).) (1840–1890)	2 December 1875	9 December 1879	4 years, 7 days	Conservative	Antonio Cánovas del Castillo	Alfonso XII (1874–1885)	
The Count of Toreno (1840–1890)	2 December 1875	9 December 1879	4 years, 7 days	Conservative	Arsenio Martínez Campos	Alfonso XII (1874–1885)	
The Duke of Mandas and Villanueva (1832–1918)	9 December 1879	8 February 1881	1 year, 61 days	Conservative	Antonio Cánovas del Castillo	Alfonso XII (1874–1885)	
José Luis Albareda y Sezde (1828–1897)	8 February 1881	9 January 1883	1 year, 335 days	Liberal	Práxedes Mateo Sagasta	Alfonso XII (1874–1885)	
Germán Gamazo (1840–1901)	9 January 1883	13 October 1883	277 days	Liberal	Práxedes Mateo Sagasta	Alfonso XII (1874–1885)	
The Duke of Abrantes (1841–1898)	13 October 1883	18 January 1884	97 days	Liberal	José Posada Herrera	Alfonso XII (1874–1885)	
Alejandro Pidal y Mon (1846–1913)	18 January 1884	27 November 1885	1 year, 313 days	Conservative	Antonio Cánovas del Castillo	Alfonso XII (1874–1885)	
Eugenio Montero Ríos (1832–1914)	27 November 1885	10 October 1886	317 days	Liberal	Práxedes Mateo Sagasta	Alfonso XIII (1886–1931)	
Carlos Navarro Rodrigo (1833–1903)	10 October 1886	14 June 1888	1 year, 248 days	Liberal	Práxedes Mateo Sagasta	Alfonso XIII (1886–1931)	
José Canalejas y Méndez (1854–1912)	14 June 1888	11 December 1888	180 days	Liberal	Práxedes Mateo Sagasta	Alfonso XIII (1886–1931)	
The Duke of Bivona (1838–1898)	11 December 1888	21 January 1890	1 year, 41 days	Liberal	Práxedes Mateo Sagasta	Alfonso XIII (1886–1931)	
The Duke of Veragua (1837–1910)	21 January 1890	5 July 1890	165 days	Liberal	Práxedes Mateo Sagasta	Alfonso XIII (1886–1931)	
Santos Isasa y Valseca (1822–1907)	5 July 1890	23 November 1891	1 year, 141 days	Conservative	Antonio Cánovas del Castillo	Alfonso XIII (1886–1931)	
Aureliano Linares Rivas (1841–1903)	23 November 1891	11 December 1892	1 year, 18 days	Conservative	Antonio Cánovas del Castillo	Alfonso XIII (1886–1931)	
Segismundo Moret (1838–1913)	11 December 1892	12 March 1894	1 year, 91 days	Liberal	Práxedes Mateo Sagasta	Alfonso XIII (1886–1931)	
Alejandro Groizard y Gómez de la Serna (Note: Acting during the absences of the Minister: Benigno Quiroga y López Ballesteros, Director-General for Public Works (8 August – 5 September 1894).) (1830–1919)	12 March 1894	4 November 1894	237 days	Liberal	Práxedes Mateo Sagasta	Alfonso XIII (1886–1931)	
Joaquín López Puigcerver (1841–1906)	4 November 1894	23 March 1895	139 days	Liberal	Práxedes Mateo Sagasta	Alfonso XIII (1886–1931)	
Alberto Bosch y Fustegueras (1848–1900)	23 March 1895	14 December 1895	266 days	Conservative	Antonio Cánovas del Castillo†	Alfonso XIII (1886–1931)	
Aureliano Linares Rivas (1841–1903)	14 December 1895	4 October 1897	1 year, 294 days	Conservative	Antonio Cánovas del Castillo†	Alfonso XIII (1886–1931)	
Aureliano Linares Rivas (1841–1903)	14 December 1895	4 October 1897	1 year, 294 days	Conservative	Marcelo Azcárraga	Alfonso XIII (1886–1931)	
The Duke of Bivona (1838–1898)	4 October 1897	18 May 1898	226 days	Liberal	Práxedes Mateo Sagasta	Alfonso XIII (1886–1931)	
Germán Gamazo (1840–1901)	18 May 1898	22 October 1898	157 days	Liberal	Práxedes Mateo Sagasta	Alfonso XIII (1886–1931)	
Práxedes Mateo Sagasta (1825–1903) acting minister	22 October 1898	10 February 1899	111 days	Liberal	Práxedes Mateo Sagasta	Alfonso XIII (1886–1931)	
Vicente Romero Girón (1835–1900)	10 February 1899	4 March 1899	22 days	Liberal	Práxedes Mateo Sagasta	Alfonso XIII (1886–1931)	
The Marquess of Pidal (1842–1913)	4 March 1899	18 April 1900	1 year, 45 days	Conservative	Francisco Silvela	Alfonso XIII (1886–1931)	
Rafael Gasset (1866–1927)	18 April 1900	23 October 1900	79 days	Conservative	Francisco Silvela	Alfonso XIII (1886–1931)	
Joaquín Sánchez de Toca (1852–1942)	23 October 1900	6 March 1901	243 days	Conservative	Marcelo Azcárraga	Alfonso XIII (1886–1931)	
Miguel Villanueva y Gómez (1852–1931)	6 March 1901	19 March 1902	1 year, 13 days	Liberal	Práxedes Mateo Sagasta	Alfonso XIII (1886–1931)	
José Canalejas y Méndez (1854–1912)	19 March 1902	31 May 1902	73 days	Liberal	Práxedes Mateo Sagasta	Alfonso XIII (1886–1931)	
Félix Suárez Inclán (1854–1939)	31 May 1902	15 November 1902	168 days	Liberal	Práxedes Mateo Sagasta	Alfonso XIII (1886–1931)	
Amós Salvador Rodrigáñez (1845–1922)	15 November 1902	6 December 1902	21 days	Liberal	Práxedes Mateo Sagasta	Alfonso XIII (1886–1931)	
The Marquess of Vadillo (1848–1919)	6 December 1902	20 July 1903	226 days	Conservative	Francisco Silvela	Alfonso XIII (1886–1931)	
Rafael Gasset (1866–1927)	20 July 1903	5 December 1903	138 days	Conservative	The Marquess of Pozo Rubio	Alfonso XIII (1886–1931)	
Manuel Allendesalazar (1856–1923)	5 December 1903	5 December 1904	1 year, 0 days	Conservative	Antonio Maura	Alfonso XIII (1886–1931)	
The Marquess of Figueroa (1861–1932)	5 December 1904	16 December 1904	11 days	Conservative	Antonio Maura	Alfonso XIII (1886–1931)	
José de Cárdenas Uriarte (1846–1907)	16 December 1904	27 January 1905	42 days	Conservative	Marcelo Azcárraga	Alfonso XIII (1886–1931)	
The Marquess of Vadillo (1848–1919)	27 January 1905	23 June 1905	147 days	Conservative	The Marquess of Pozo Rubio	Alfonso XIII (1886–1931)	
The Count of Romanones (Note: Acting during absence of the Minister: Federico Requejo y Avedillo, Director-General for Public Works (15 – 23 July 1905).) (1863–1950)	23 June 1905	1 December 1905	161 days	Liberal	Eugenio Montero Ríos	Alfonso XIII (1886–1931)	
Rafael Gasset (Note: Acting during absence of the Minister: Julio Burell Cuéllar, Director-General for Public Works (14–18 January 1906 and 13–17 February 1906).) (1866–1927)	1 December 1905	6 July 1906	217 days	Liberal	Segismundo Moret	Alfonso XIII (1886–1931)	
The Marquess of Alhucemas (Note: Acting during absence of the Minister: Juan Fernández Latorre, Director-General for Public Works (20 July – 18 August 1906).) (1859–1938)	6 July 1906	30 November 1906	147 days	Liberal	José López Domínguez	Alfonso XIII (1886–1931)	
Rafael Gasset (1866–1927)	30 November 1906	4 December 1906	4 days	Liberal	Segismundo Moret	Alfonso XIII (1886–1931)	
Francisco de Federico y Martínez (1846–1910)	4 December 1906	25 January 1907	52 days	Liberal	The Marquess of Vega de Armijo	Alfonso XIII (1886–1931)	
Augusto González Besada (Note: Acting during absence of the Minister: Rafael Andrade Navarrete, Director-General for Public Works (5 August – 7 September 1907 and 27 July – 16 September 1908).) (1865–1919)	25 January 1907	14 September 1908	1 year, 233 days	Conservative	Antonio Maura	Alfonso XIII (1886–1931)	
José Sánchez-Guerra y Martínez (1859–1935)	14 September 1908	21 October 1909	1 year, 37 days	Conservative	Antonio Maura	Alfonso XIII (1886–1931)	
Rafael Gasset (Note: Acting during absence of the Minister: Julio Burell Cuéllar, Director-General for Public Works (3–14 January 1910).) (1866–1927)	21 October 1909	9 February 1910	111 days	Liberal	Segismundo Moret	Alfonso XIII (1886–1931)	
Fermín Calbetón y Blanchón (Note: Acting during absence of the Minister: Javier Gómez de la Serna y Laguna, Director-General for Public Works (23–28 June 1910) and Tesifonte Gallego García, Director-General for Agriculture, Industry and Trade (13–15 July 1910 and 19–28 August 1910).) (1853–1919)	9 February 1910	2 January 1911	327 days	Liberal	José Canalejas y Méndez†	Alfonso XIII (1886–1931)	
Rafael Gasset (1866–1927)	2 January 1911	12 March 1912	1 year, 70 days	Liberal	José Canalejas y Méndez†	Alfonso XIII (1886–1931)	
Miguel Villanueva y Gómez (1852–1931)	12 March 1912	24 May 1913	1 year, 73 days	Liberal	José Canalejas y Méndez†	Alfonso XIII (1886–1931)	
Miguel Villanueva y Gómez (1852–1931)	12 March 1912	24 May 1913	1 year, 73 days	Liberal	The Marquess of Alhucemas (Note: He acted as acting prime minister after the assassination of José Canalejas on 12 November 1912)	Alfonso XIII (1886–1931)	
Miguel Villanueva y Gómez (1852–1931)	12 March 1912	24 May 1913	1 year, 73 days	Liberal	The Count of Romanones	Alfonso XIII (1886–1931)	
Rafael Gasset (1866–1927)	24 May 1913	27 October 1913	156 days	Liberal	The Count of Romanones	Alfonso XIII (1886–1931)	
Francisco Javier Ugarte Pagés (Note: Acting during absence of the Minister: Abilio Calderón y Rojo, Director-General for Public Works (20–29 April 1914).) (1852–1919)	27 October 1913	25 October 1915	1 year, 363 days	Conservative	Eduardo Dato	Alfonso XIII (1886–1931)	
Luis Espada Guntín (1858–1937)	25 October 1915	9 December 1915	45 days	Conservative	Eduardo Dato	Alfonso XIII (1886–1931)	
Amós Salvador Rodrigáñez (1845–1922)	9 December 1915	30 April 1916	143 days	Liberal	The Count of Romanones	Alfonso XIII (1886–1931)	
Miguel Villanueva y Gómez (1852–1931)	30 April 1916	19 April 1917	354 days	Liberal	The Count of Romanones	Alfonso XIII (1886–1931)	
The Duke of Almodóvar del Valle (Note: Acting during absence of the Minister: Estanislao D'Angelo y Muñoz, Director-General for Public Works (14–19 May 1917).) (1872–1931)	19 April 1917	11 June 1917	53 days	Liberal	The Marquess of Alhucemas	Alfonso XIII (1886–1931)	
The Viscount of Eza (1873–1945)	11 June 1917	3 November 1917	145 days	Conservative	Eduardo Dato	Alfonso XIII (1886–1931)	
Niceto Alcalá-Zamora (Note: Acting during absence of the Minister: Vicente Cantos Figuerola, Director-General for Trade, Industry and Labour (24 January – 2 February 1918; 23–31 July 1918; 6–11 September 1918; and 24 September – 1 October 1918).) (1877–1949)	3 November 1917	22 March 1918	139 days	Liberal Democrat	The Marquess of Alhucemas	Alfonso XIII (1886–1931)	
Francesc Cambó (1876–1947)	22 March 1918	9 November 1918	232 days	Conservative	Antonio Maura	Alfonso XIII (1886–1931)	
The Marquess of Alhucemas (1859–1938) acting minister	9 November 1918	5 December 1918	26 days	Liberal Democrat	The Marquess of Alhucemas	Alfonso XIII (1886–1931)	
The Marquess of Cortina (1860–1932)	5 December 1918	15 April 1919	131 days	Liberal	The Count of Romanones	Alfonso XIII (1886–1931)	
Ángel Ossorio y Gallardo (1873–1946)	15 April 1919	20 July 1919	96 days	Conservative	Antonio Maura	Alfonso XIII (1886–1931)	
Abilio Calderón Rojo (1867–1939)	20 July 1919	12 December 1919	145 days	Conservative	Joaquín Sánchez de Toca	Alfonso XIII (1886–1931)	
The Count of Gimeno (1852–1936)	12 December 1919	14 February 1920	64 days	Conservative	Manuel Allendesalazar	Alfonso XIII (1886–1931)	
Manuel Allendesalazar (1856–1923) acting minister	14 February 1920	17 February 1920	3 days	Conservative	Manuel Allendesalazar	Alfonso XIII (1886–1931)	
Emilio Ortuño Berte (1862–1936)	17 February 1920	1 September 1920	197 days	Conservative	Manuel Allendesalazar	Alfonso XIII (1886–1931)	
Emilio Ortuño Berte (1862–1936)	17 February 1920	1 September 1920	197 days	Conservative	Eduardo Dato†	Alfonso XIII (1886–1931)	
Luis Espada Guntín (1858–1937)	1 September 1920	13 March 1921	193 days	Conservative	Eduardo Dato†	Alfonso XIII (1886–1931)	
Luis Espada Guntín (1858–1937)	1 September 1920	13 March 1921	193 days	Conservative	The Count of Bugallal (Note: He acted acting prime minister after the assassination of Eduardo Dato from March 8 to March 13, 1921)	Alfonso XIII (1886–1931)	
Juan de la Cierva y Peñafiel (1864–1938)	13 March 1921	14 August 1921	154 days	Conservative	Manuel Allendesalazar	Alfonso XIII (1886–1931)	
José Maestre Pérez (1866–1933)	14 August 1921	8 March 1922	206 days	Conservative	Antonio Maura	Alfonso XIII (1886–1931)	
Manuel Argüelles Argüelles (Note: Acting during absence of the Minister: Luis Rodríguez de Viguri, Under-Secretary and Director-General for Mines, Metallurgy and Naval Industries (29 July – 21 August 1922).) (1875–1945)	8 March 1922	4 December 1922	271 days	Conservative	José Sánchez-Guerra y Martínez	Alfonso XIII (1886–1931)	
Luis Rodríguez de Viguri (1881–1945)	4 December 1922	7 December 1922	3 days	Conservative	José Sánchez-Guerra y Martínez	Alfonso XIII (1886–1931)	
Rafael Gasset (Note: Acting during absence of the Minister: José Nicoláu y Sabater, Director-General for Public Works (27–31 March 1923 and 16–29 August 1923).) (1866–1927)	7 December 1922	3 September 1923	270 days	Liberal	The Marquess of Alhucemas	Alfonso XIII (1886–1931)	
Manuel Portela Valladares (Note: Acting during absence of the Minister: Isidoro Rodrigáñez Sánchez-Guerra, Director-General for Agriculture and Forestry (12–15 September 1923).) (1867–1952)	3 September 1923	15 September 1923	12 days	Liberal	The Marquess of Alhucemas	Alfonso XIII (1886–1931)	
José Vicente Arche (Note: Ordinary discharge of duties.) acting minister	15 September 1923	21 December 1923	97 days	Independent	The Marquess of Estella	Alfonso XIII (1886–1931)	
Pedro Vives (1858–1938) acting minister	21 December 1923	3 December 1925	66 days	Military	The Marquess of Estella	Alfonso XIII (1886–1931)	
The Count of Guadalhorce (1876–1952)	3 December 1925	30 January 1930	4 years, 58 days	Patriotic Unionist	The Marquess of Estella	Alfonso XIII (1886–1931)	
Leopoldo Matos y Massieu (Note: Acting during absence of the Minister: José Martínez Acacio, Director-General for Public Works (12–21 April 1930).) (1878–1936)	30 January 1930	25 November 1930	299 days	Conservative	The Count of Xauen	Alfonso XIII (1886–1931)	
José Estrada y Estrada (Note: Acting during absence of the Minister: Antonio Taboada Tundidor, Director-General for Public Works (30 December 1930 – 3 January 1931).) (1874–1936)	25 November 1930	18 February 1931	85 days	Conservative	The Count of Xauen	Alfonso XIII (1886–1931)	
Juan de la Cierva y Peñafiel (1864–1938)	18 February 1931	14 April 1931	55 days	Conservative	Juan Bautista Aznar-Cabañas	Alfonso XIII (1886–1931)	
Álvaro de Albornoz (Note: During the absence of the Minister: Félix Gordón Ordás, Under-Secretary and Director-General for Mines and Fuels (23–27 May 1931 and 8–13 July 1931) and José Salmerón García, Director-General for Public Works (11–15 September 1931 and 26–29 September 1931).) (1879–1954)	14 April 1931	16 December 1931	246 days	Radical Socialist Republican	Niceto Alcalá-Zamora	Niceto Alcalá-Zamora (1931–1936)	
Álvaro de Albornoz (1879–1954)	14 April 1931	16 December 1931	246 days	Radical Socialist Republican	Manuel Azaña	Niceto Alcalá-Zamora (1931–1936)	
Indalecio Prieto (Note: During the absence of the Minister: Niceto Alcalá-Zamora, Prime Minister (26–28 June 1931)) (1883–1962)	16 December 1931	12 September 1933	1 year, 270 days	Socialist	Manuel Azaña	Niceto Alcalá-Zamora (1931–1936)	
Rafael Guerra del Río (Note: During the absence of the Minister: Félix Gordón Ordás, Minister of Industry and Trade (25 October – 7 November 1933) and Cirilo del Río Rodríguez, Minister of Agriculture (19 July – 2 August 1934).) (1885–1955)	12 September 1933	4 October 1934	1 year, 22 days	Radical Republican	Alejandro Lerroux	Niceto Alcalá-Zamora (1931–1936)	
Rafael Guerra del Río (1885–1955)	12 September 1933	4 October 1934	1 year, 22 days	Radical Republican	Diego Martínez Barrio	Niceto Alcalá-Zamora (1931–1936)	
Rafael Guerra del Río (1885–1955)	12 September 1933	4 October 1934	1 year, 22 days	Radical Republican	Alejandro Lerroux	Niceto Alcalá-Zamora (1931–1936)	
Rafael Guerra del Río (1885–1955)	12 September 1933	4 October 1934	1 year, 22 days	Radical Republican	Ricardo Samper	Niceto Alcalá-Zamora (1931–1936)	
José María Cid Ruiz-Zorrilla (1882–1956)	4 October 1934	3 April 1935	181 days	Agrarian	Alejandro Lerroux	Niceto Alcalá-Zamora (1931–1936)	
Rafael Guerra del Río (1885–1955)	3 April 1935	6 May 1935	33 days	Radical Republican	Alejandro Lerroux	Niceto Alcalá-Zamora (1931–1936)	
Manuel Marraco Ramón (1870–1956)	6 May 1935	25 September 1935	142 days	Radical Republican	Alejandro Lerroux	Niceto Alcalá-Zamora (1931–1936)	
Luis Lucia Lucia (1888–1943)	25 September 1935	14 December 1935	80 days	CEDA	Joaquín Chapaprieta	Niceto Alcalá-Zamora (1931–1936)	
Cirilo del Río Rodríguez (1892–1957)	14 December 1935	19 February 1936	67 days	Liberal Republican Right	Manuel Portela Valladares	Niceto Alcalá-Zamora (1931–1936)	
Santiago Casares Quiroga (1884–1950)	19 February 1936	13 May 1936	84 days	Republican Left	Manuel Azaña	Niceto Alcalá-Zamora (1931–1936)	
Santiago Casares Quiroga (1884–1950)	19 February 1936	13 May 1936	84 days	Republican Left	Augusto Barcia Trelles (Note: Acting prime minister from 10 to 13 May 1936)	Manuel Azaña (1936–1939)	
Antonio Velao (1884–1959)	13 May 1936	19 July 1936	67 days	Republican Left	Santiago Casares Quiroga	Manuel Azaña (1936–1939)	
Antonio Lara Zárate (1881–1956)	19 July 1936	19 July 1936	0 days	Republican Unionist	Diego Martínez Barrio	Manuel Azaña (1936–1939)	
Antonio Velao (1884–1959)	21 July 1936	4 September 1936	45 days	Republican Left	José Giral	Manuel Azaña (1936–1939)	
Vicente Uribe (1902–1961) acting minister	4 September 1936	15 September 1936	11 days	Communist	Francisco Largo Caballero	Manuel Azaña (1936–1939)	
Julio Just Gimeno (1894–1976)	15 September 1936	17 May 1937	244 days	Republican Left	Francisco Largo Caballero	Manuel Azaña (1936–1939)	
Bernardo Giner de los Ríos (1888–1970)	17 May 1937	5 April 1938	323 days	Republican Unionist	Juan Negrín	Manuel Azaña (1936–1939)	
Antonio Velao (1884–1959)	5 April 1938	5 March 1939	334 days	Republican Left	Juan Negrín	Manuel Azaña (1936–1939)	
Eduardo Val (1906–1992)	5 March 1939	31 March 1939	26 days	Independent (CNT)	National Defence Council	José Miaja (1939)	
Mauro Serret y Mirete (Note: Serving under the title of "Chairman of the Public Works and Communications Commission".) (1872–1945)	5 October 1936	31 January 1938	1 year, 118 days	Independent	Junta Técnica del Estado	Francisco Franco (1939–1975)	
Alfonso Peña Boeuf (1888–1966)	31 January 1938	20 July 1945	7 years, 170 days	National Movement	Franco I	Francisco Franco (1939–1975)	
Alfonso Peña Boeuf (1888–1966)	31 January 1938	20 July 1945	7 years, 170 days	National Movement	Franco II	Francisco Franco (1939–1975)	
The Count of San Pedro (1885–1954)	20 July 1945	19 July 1951	5 years, 364 days	National Movement	Franco III	Francisco Franco (1939–1975)	
The Marquess of Covarrubias de Leyva (1886–1964)	19 July 1951	25 February 1957	5 years, 221 days	National Movement	Franco IV	Francisco Franco (1939–1975)	
Jorge Vigón (1893–1978)	25 February 1957	7 July 1965	8 years, 132 days	National Movement	Franco V	Francisco Franco (1939–1975)	
Jorge Vigón (1893–1978)	25 February 1957	7 July 1965	8 years, 132 days	National Movement	Franco VI	Francisco Franco (1939–1975)	
Federico Silva Muñoz (1923–1997)	7 July 1965	13 April 1970	4 years, 280 days	National Movement	Franco VII	Francisco Franco (1939–1975)	
Federico Silva Muñoz (1923–1997)	7 July 1965	13 April 1970	4 years, 280 days	National Movement	Franco VIII	Francisco Franco (1939–1975)	
Gonzalo Fernández de la Mora (1924–2002)	13 April 1970	3 January 1974	3 years, 265 days	National Movement	Franco VIII	Francisco Franco (1939–1975)	
Gonzalo Fernández de la Mora (1924–2002)	13 April 1970	3 January 1974	3 years, 265 days	National Movement	Luis Carrero Blanco†	Francisco Franco (1939–1975)	
Gonzalo Fernández de la Mora (1924–2002)	13 April 1970	3 January 1974	3 years, 265 days	National Movement	The Duke of Fernández-Miranda (acting)	Francisco Franco (1939–1975)	
Gonzalo Fernández de la Mora (1924–2002)	13 April 1970	3 January 1974	3 years, 265 days	National Movement	The Marquess of Arias Navarro	Francisco Franco (1939–1975)	
Antonio Valdés González-Roldán (1926–2007)	3 January 1974	7 July 1976	2 years, 186 days	National Movement	The Marquess of Arias Navarro	Francisco Franco (1939–1975)	
Antonio Valdés González-Roldán (1926–2007)	3 January 1974	7 July 1976	2 years, 186 days	National Movement	The Marquess of Arias Navarro	Juan Carlos I (1975–2014)	
The Marquess of Ría de Ribadeo (1926–2008)	7 July 1976	23 April 1977	290 days	Centrist	The Duke of Suárez	Juan Carlos I (1975–2014)	
Carlos Pérez de Bricio (1927–2022) acting minister	23 April 1977	10 May 1977	17 days	Spanish Democratic Union	The Duke of Suárez	Juan Carlos I (1975–2014)	
Luis Ortiz González (1932–2006)	10 May 1977	4 July 1977	55 days	Centrist	The Duke of Suárez	Juan Carlos I (1975–2014)	
Joaquín Garrigues Walker (1933–1980)	4 July 1977	5 April 1979	1 year, 275 days	Centrist	The Duke of Suárez	Juan Carlos I (1975–2014)	
Jesús Sancho Rof (born 1940)	5 April 1979	26 February 1981	1 year, 327 days	Centrist	The Duke of Suárez	Juan Carlos I (1975–2014)	
Luis Ortiz González (1932–2006)	26 February 1981	2 December 1982	1 year, 279 days	Centrist	The Marquess of Ría de Ribadeo	Juan Carlos I (1975–2014)	
Julián Campo (born 1938)	2 December 1982	4 July 1985	2 years, 214 days	Socialist	Felipe González	Juan Carlos I (1975–2014)	
Javier Sáenz de Cosculluela (born 1944)	4 July 1985	12 March 1991	5 years, 251 days	Socialist	Felipe González	Juan Carlos I (1975–2014)	
Josep Borrell (born 1947)	13 July 1993	5 May 1996	5 years, 54 days	Socialist	Felipe González	Juan Carlos I (1975–2014)	
Rafael Arias-Salgado (born 1942)	5 May 1996	28 April 2000	3 years, 359 days	Popular	José María Aznar	Juan Carlos I (1975–2014)	
Francisco Álvarez-Cascos (born 1947)	28 April 2000	18 April 2004	3 years, 356 days	Popular	José María Aznar	Juan Carlos I (1975–2014)	
Magdalena Álvarez (born 1952)	18 April 2004	8 April 2009	4 years, 355 days	Socialist	José Luis Rodríguez Zapatero	Juan Carlos I (1975–2014)	
José Blanco López (born 1962)	8 April 2009	22 December 2011	2 years, 258 days	Socialist	José Luis Rodríguez Zapatero	Juan Carlos I (1975–2014)	
Ana Pastor Julián (born 1957)	22 December 2011	19 July 2016	4 years, 210 days	Popular	Mariano Rajoy	Juan Carlos I (1975–2014)	
Ana Pastor Julián (born 1957)	22 December 2011	19 July 2016	4 years, 210 days	Popular	Mariano Rajoy	Felipe VI (2014-present)	
Rafael Catalá (born 1961) acting minister	19 July 2016	4 November 2016	108 days	Popular	Mariano Rajoy	Felipe VI (2014-present)	
Íñigo de la Serna (born 1971)	4 November 2016	7 June 2018	1 year, 215 days	Popular	Mariano Rajoy	Felipe VI (2014-present)	
José Luis Ábalos (born 1959)	7 June 2018	12 July 2021	3 years, 35 days	Socialist	Pedro Sánchez	Felipe VI (2014-present)	
Raquel Sánchez Jiménez (born 1975)	12 July 2021	21 November 2023	2 years, 132 days	Socialist	Pedro Sánchez	Felipe VI (2014-present)	
Óscar Puente (born 1968)	21 November 2023	4 November 2026	2 years, 348 days	Socialist	Pedro Sánchez	Felipe VI (2014-present)	
Carlos Cuerpo (born 1980) acting minister	4 November 2026	Incumbent	9 days	Independent	Pedro Sánchez	Felipe VI (2014-present)	
