= Augusto González Besada =

Spanish lawyer and politician

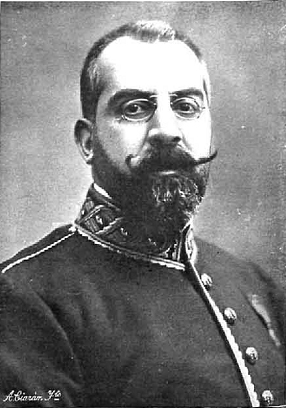
- Photograph by Kaulak

President of the Congress of Deputies
- In office 3 April 1914 – 16 March 1916
- Monarch: Alfonso XIII
- Preceded by: Miguel Villanueva y Gómez
- Succeeded by: Miguel Villanueva y Gómez

Member of the Congress of Deputies
- In office 9 May 1899 – 4 June 1919

Seat J of the Real Academia Española
- In office 7 May 1916 – 4 June 1919
- Preceded by: Juan José Herranz
- Succeeded by: Julio Casares

Minister of Finance of Spain
- In office 22 March – 9 November 1918
- Monarch: Alfonso XIII
- Prime Minister: Antonio Maura
- Preceded by: José de Caralt y Sala
- Succeeded by: Santiago Alba y Bonifaz
- In office 14 September 1908 – 21 October 1909
- Monarch: Alfonso XIII
- Prime Minister: Antonio Maura
- Preceded by: Cayetano Sánchez Bustillo
- Succeeded by: Juan Alvarado y del Saz
- In office 20 July – 5 December 1903
- Monarch: Alfonso XIII
- Regent: Maria Christina of Austria
- Prime Minister: Raimundo Fernández-Villaverde
- Preceded by: Faustino Rodríguez-San Pedro
- Succeeded by: Guillermo de Osma

Minister of Development of Spain
- In office 25 January 1907 – 14 September 1908
- Monarch: Alfonso XIII
- Prime Minister: Antonio Maura
- Preceded by: Francisco de Federico y Martínez
- Succeeded by: José Sánchez-Guerra y Martínez

Minister of Governance of Spain
- In office 27 January – 23 June 1905
- Monarch: Alfonso XIII
- Prime Minister: Raimundo Fernández-Villaverde
- Regent: Maria Christina of Austria
- Prime Minister: Raimundo Fernández-Villaverde
- Preceded by: Francisco Javier González de Castejón
- Succeeded by: Manuel García Prieto

Personal details
- Born: Augusto González Besada y Mein; 24 June 1865 Tuy, Spain
- Died: 4 June 1919 (aged 53) Madrid, Spain
- Party: Conservative Party
- Spouse(s): Carolina Giráldez y Fagúndez, 1st Marchioness of González Besada
- Education: University of Santiago de Compostela
- Profession: Lawyer and politician

Augusto González Besada (June 14, 1865 – June 4, 1919) was a Spanish lawyer and politician who served as President of the Congress of Deputies, Minister of Finance, Minister of the Interior and Minister of Development during the reign of King Alfonso XIII.

== Biography ==
González Besada was member of one of the most powerful families of the Province of Pontevedra. His father, as well as his uncles, were members of the Provincial Deputation of Pontevedra, and one of his uncles, Sabino, was President of the Deputation from 1896 to 1898 and Civil Governor of Pontevedra in two occasions.

After obtaining the bachelor's degree, he entered in the University of Santiago de Compostela where he studied law obtaining the degree in 1885. He started his professional work in the Bar Association of Pontevedra where he obtained a lot of fame and later in Madrid.

Member of the Conservative Party, he was elected MP in 1899 by the constituency of Pontevedra and he was re-elected in the elections of 1901, 1903 and 1905. In the next electoral processes, González Besada was elected by the constituencies of Cádiz in 1907, Almeria in 1910, Alicante in 1914 and Lugo in 1916 and 1919.

In 1902 he was appointed Under Secretary of Finance and he was promoted to Minister of Finance from July 20, 1903, to December 5, 1903, by prime minister Raimundo Fernández Villaverde, being the youngest Finance Minister of the Restoration. He also held this portfolio in two more occasions: between September 14, 1908, and October 21, 1909, and in 1918, both occasions in the cabinets of Antonio Maura.

With Fernández Villaverde again as premier, González Besada was appointed Interior Minister from January 27 to June 23, 1905, and again with Maura, Development Minister from January 25, 1907, to September 14, 1908.

He was one of the spokespersons of the conservative opposition in the Congress of Deputies, an opposition that rejected the Consumables Substitution Act planned by José Canalejas and he announced that when the conservatives return to power, they would block that law, as it happened.

As Minister of Development he focused his forces on improving the Asturian ports of Ribadesella, Villaviciosa y Gijón as well as the repopulation of the rivers of that area but, above all, the Asturian region named him honorary citizen of the region because of his support to the railway project of the region.

He was elected President of the Congress of Deputies for the first time on April 3, 1914. He was elected by 285 votes of the 286 possibles and he was elected as an acting president. The House confirmed his election on April 28, 1914, by unanimity. He was re-elected again on November 11, 1915, for a second term by 255 votes of 257. In December, after the fall of the Cabinet of Eduardo Dato, the King proposed him to form a new government but he rejected it because that proposal was limited to be a temporary prime minister and without the authority to dissolve the Cortes and call for elections. In spite of rejecting the offer, González Besada became a great advisor to the government and the monarch.

In 1915, Maura nominated him as a member of the Spanish Royal Academy and he assumed in May 1916. He was also a member of the Royal Academy of Moral and Political Sciences, and of the Royal Academy of Jurisprudence of which he became president.

On June 4, 1919, three days after the being elected in the general election, González Besada passed away. He would be replaced as MP by his son Carlos González Besada y Giráldez. Two years later, to honor his memory, King Alfonso XIII created the Marquessate of González Besada, in favor of his widow.
