= Álvaro de Figueroa, 1st Count of Romanones =

Spanish diplomat, politician, and writer (1863–1950)

The Count of Romanones
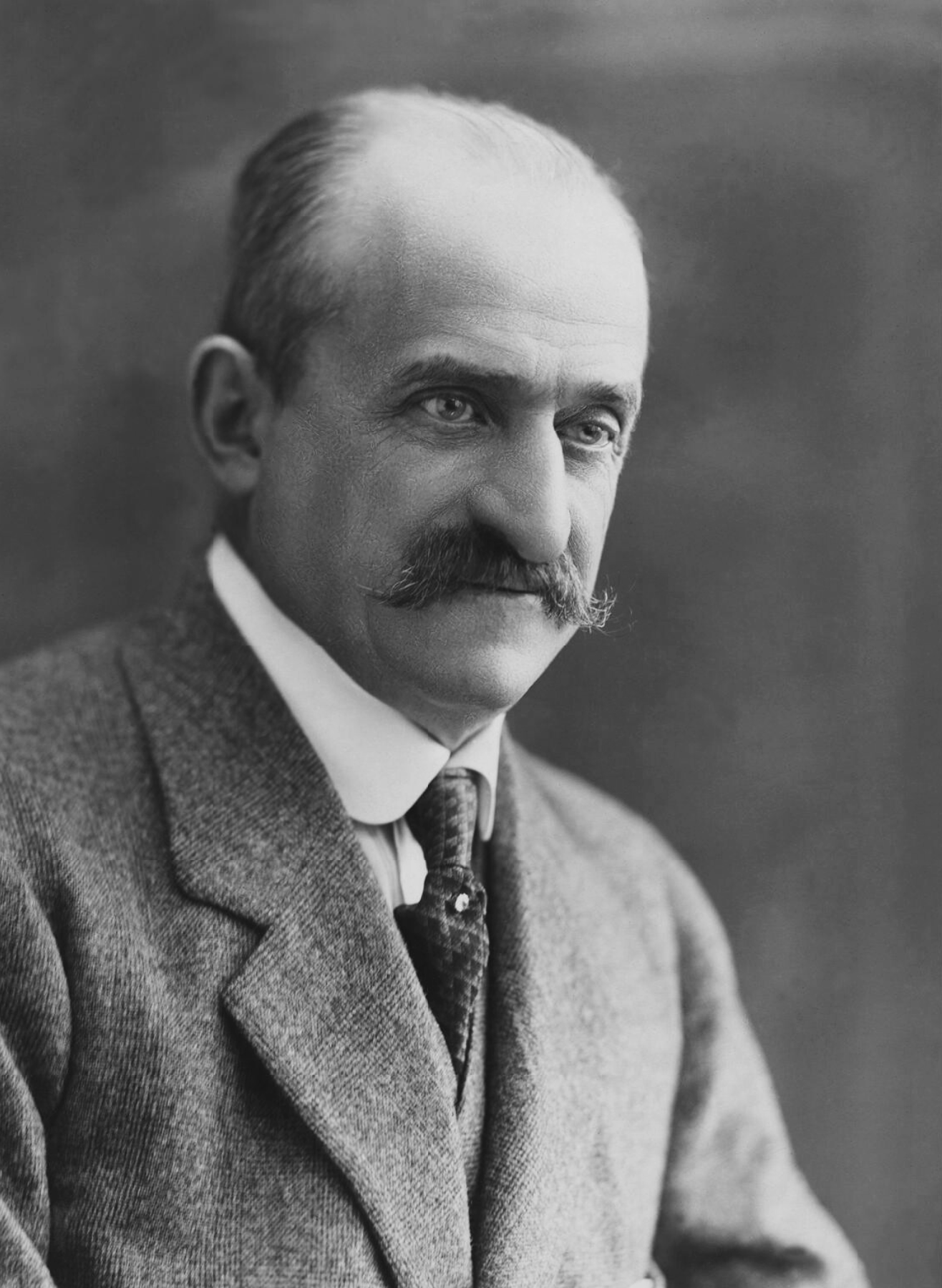
- Portrait by Bassano, 1914

Prime Minister of Spain
- In office 5 December 1918 – 14 April 1919
- Monarch: Alfonso XIII
- Preceded by: Manuel García Prieto
- Succeeded by: Antonio Maura
- In office 9 December 1915 – 19 April 1917
- Monarch: Alfonso XIII
- Preceded by: Eduardo Dato
- Succeeded by: Manuel García Prieto
- In office 14 November 1912 – 27 October 1913
- Monarch: Alfonso XIII
- Preceded by: Manuel García Prieto (Acting)
- Succeeded by: Eduardo Dato

President of the Senate of Spain
- In office 26 May – 13 November 1923
- Monarch: Alfonso XIII
- Preceded by: Joaquín Sánchez de Toca
- Succeeded by: None

President of the Congress of Deputies
- In office 16 June 1910 – 18 November 1912
- Monarch: Alfonso XIII
- Preceded by: Eduardo Dato
- Succeeded by: Segismundo Moret

Mayor of Madrid
- In office 15 March 1894 – 26 March 1895
- Preceded by: Santiago de Angulo Ortiz de Traspeña
- Succeeded by: Nicolás de Peñalver y Zamora
Ministerial offices
Minister of Public Instruction and Fine Arts of Spain
In office 6 March 1901 – 6 December 1902
Monarch	Alfonso XIII
Regent	Maria Christina of Austria
Prime Minister	Práxedes Mateo Sagasta
Preceded by	Antonio García Alix
Succeeded by	Manuel Allendesalazar
In office 9 February – 9 June 1910
Monarch	Alfonso XIII
Prime Minister	José Canalejas y Méndez
Preceded by	Antonio Barroso Castillo
Succeeded by	Julio Burrell y Cuéllar
In office 10 October – 9 November 1918
Monarch	Alfonso XIII
Prime Minister	Antonio Maura
Preceded by	Santiago Alba Bonifaz
Succeeded by	Julio Burrell y Cuéllar
Minister of Agriculture, Industry, Trade and Public Works of Spain
In office 23 June – 1 December 1905
Monarch	Alfonso XIII
Prime Minister	Eugenio Montero Ríos
Preceded by	Francisco Javier González de Castejón y Elío
Succeeded by	Rafael Gasset
Minister of Governance of Spain
In office 1 December 1905 – 19 June 1906
Monarch	Alfonso XIII
Prime Minister	Segismundo Moret
Preceded by	Manuel García Prieto
Succeeded by	Benigno Quiroga y López Ballesteros
In office 4 December 1906 – 25 January 1907
Monarch	Alfonso XIII
Prime Minister	Antonio Aguilar y Correa
Preceded by	Benigno Quiroga y López Ballesteros
Succeeded by	Juan de la Cierva y Peñafiel
Minister of Grace and Justice of Spain
In office 6 July – 30 November 1906
Monarch	Alfonso XIII
Prime Minister	José López Domínguez
Preceded by	José María Celleruelo Poviones
Succeeded by	Antonio Barroso Castillo
In office 24 May – 13 June 1913
Monarch	Alfonso XIII
Prime Minister	Himself
Preceded by	Antonio Barroso Castillo
Succeeded by	Pedro Rodríguez de la Borbolla
In office 22 March – 10 October 1918
Monarch	Alfonso XIII
Prime Minister	Antonio Maura
Preceded by	Joaquín Fernández Prida
Succeeded by	Antonio Maura
In office 7 December 1922 – 26 May 1923
Monarch	Alfonso XIII
Prime Minister	Antonio Maura
Preceded by	Carlos Cañal y Migolla
Succeeded by	Antonio López Muñoz
Minister of State of Spain
Acting
In office 25 February – 30 April 1916
Monarch	Alfonso XIII
Prime Minister	Himself
Preceded by	Miguel Villanueva y Gómez
Succeeded by	Amalio Gimeno
In office 9 November 1918 – 15 April 1919
Monarch	Alfonso XIII
Prime Minister	Manuel García Prieto; Himself
Preceded by	Eduardo Dato
Succeeded by	Manuel González-Hontoria
In office 18 February – 14 April 1931
Monarch	Alfonso XIII
Prime Minister	Juan Bautista Aznar
Preceded by	Jacobo Fitz-James Stuart, 17th Duke of Alba
Succeeded by	Alejandro Lerroux

Personal details
- Born: Álvaro de Figueroa y Torres-Sotomayor; 15 August 1863 Casa de Cisneros, Madrid, Spain
- Died: 11 September 1950 (aged 87) Madrid, Spain
- Party: Liberal Party
- Spouse: Casilda Alonso-Martínez Martín (1888–1950)
- Children: 7
- Parent: Ignacio Figueroa y Mendieta (father)
- Education: Central University; Collegio di Spagna; University of Bologna

Álvaro de Figueroa y Torres, 1st Count of Romanones (9 August 1863 – 11 October 1950) was a Spanish politician and businessman. He served as Prime Minister three times between 1912 and 1918, president of the Senate, president of the Congress of Deputies, Mayor of Madrid and many times as cabinet minister. He belonged to the Liberal Party. Romanones, who built an extensive political network, exerted a tight control on the political life of the province of Guadalajara during much of the Restoration period. He also was a prolific writer, authoring a number of history essays.

== Biography ==
=== Early life ===
Born on 15 August 1863 in the Casa de Cisneros, at the Madrid's Plaza de la Villa, he was son of Ignacio Figueroa y Mendieta (a millionaire who had inherited a fortune from the mining companies of his father) and Ana de Torres y Romo (an aristocrat, daughter of the Marquis of Villamejor). His siblings were Francisca, José, Gonzalo and Rodrigo.

When he was a child, he suffered a barouche accident that broke his right leg and caused a limp for the rest of his life. His disability would come to be mocked on a regular basis in cuplés, jokes and caricatures.

He earned a licentiate degree in Law from the Central University of Madrid in 1884. He moved in February 1885 to the University of Bologna's Collegio di Spagna, where he remained until December 1885, earning a doctorate in jurisprudence by reading a dissertation titled Introduzione allo studio del diritto costituzionale. Despite this, he never practiced law.

=== Politics in Restoration Spain ===
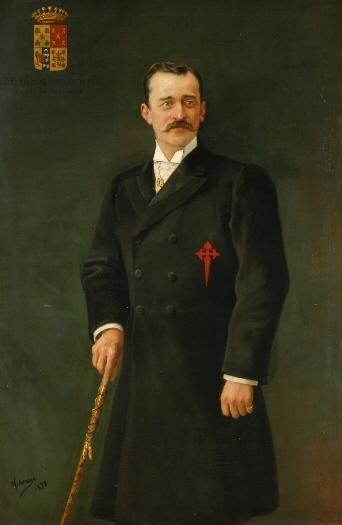
Romanones depicted in his thirties as Mayor of Madrid

In 1888, he became member of the Congress of Deputies in representation of Guadalajara for the first time, elected in a by-election to fill a vacant seat. Short by a few months of turning the 25 years of age needed to become a legislator, he reportedly hid this circumstance. Shortly after, on 21 September 1888, in San Sebastián, Figueroa married the daughter of the Minister of Grace and Justice Manuel Alonso Martínez: Casilda Alonso Martínez, with whom he had seven children: Casilda, Luis, Álvaro, Carlos, José, Eduardo and Agustín. (Note: His grandson, Carlos Figueroa, competed for Spain at the 1956 Summer Olympics.)

He participated in a parliamentary scandal in July 1889, when amid a tense squabble in the legislature, he wielded his walking stick against Felipe Ducazcal, who had reportedly approached the Marquis of Vega de Armijo displaying an aggressive attitude. He was falsely accused by Romero Robledo of "having drawn the rapier he had hidden in his cane".

He was elected Madrid municipal councillor in 1889. After serving as responsible for the districts of Buenavista and Audiencia, as patron of the School of San Ildefonso, and as director of the Services of Abattoirs, Markets and Thoroughfares and Works, Figueroa renounced to the office in 1892.

He delivered an ignominious tirade against the Mayor of Madrid Alberto Bosch y Fustegueras from his parliamentary seat in 1892, so much that the offended called for a duel, which was held on 10 July 1892 in Leganés. The combatants crossed two shots. He also held another duel with the Marquis of Valdeiglesias.

In 1894 he was appointed as Mayor of Madrid. In 1896 he acquired a daily newspaper, El Globo, based in Madrid, appointing Francos Rodríguez as editor and tilting the editorial line from republicanism to liberal monarchism.

He served as Minister of Public Instruction and Fine Arts (1901–1902) in the government of Sagasta. In 1901, he incorporated primary education teachers' salaries (hitherto dependent on the local administrations) in the State budget, securing the teachers economic autonomy and curbing the influence of caciquismo in education. In 1903 he founded a new political newspaper, Diario Universal, replacing El Globo, which had been sold to Emilio Rius y Periquet.

In the Liberal governments of 1905 and 1906 he was Minister of Development (Fomento which included agriculture, industry, commerce and public works), Justice and Interior. He contributed to the rise of José Canalejas to the top of the Liberal Party and, as a reward, he was appointed minister of public instruction in 1909 and later promoted to the presidency of the House of Representatives (Congreso de los Diputados) in 1912.

After the assassination of Canalejas, he became one of the prominent figures in the Liberal Party and he was appointed prime minister (1912–1913). He negotiated with France a treaty on Morocco.

During the First World War he held a pro-French stance, which put him in conflict with the official declaration of neutrality of the government of Eduardo Dato and with the pro-German stance of the conservatives. When he again became prime minister (1915–1917), he changed Spain's foreign policy closer to the Allies and confronting Germany over an incident of Spanish ships being torpedoed by German submarines. Incapable of resolving Spain's social problems and attacked by the pro-German conservative press, he finally resigned.

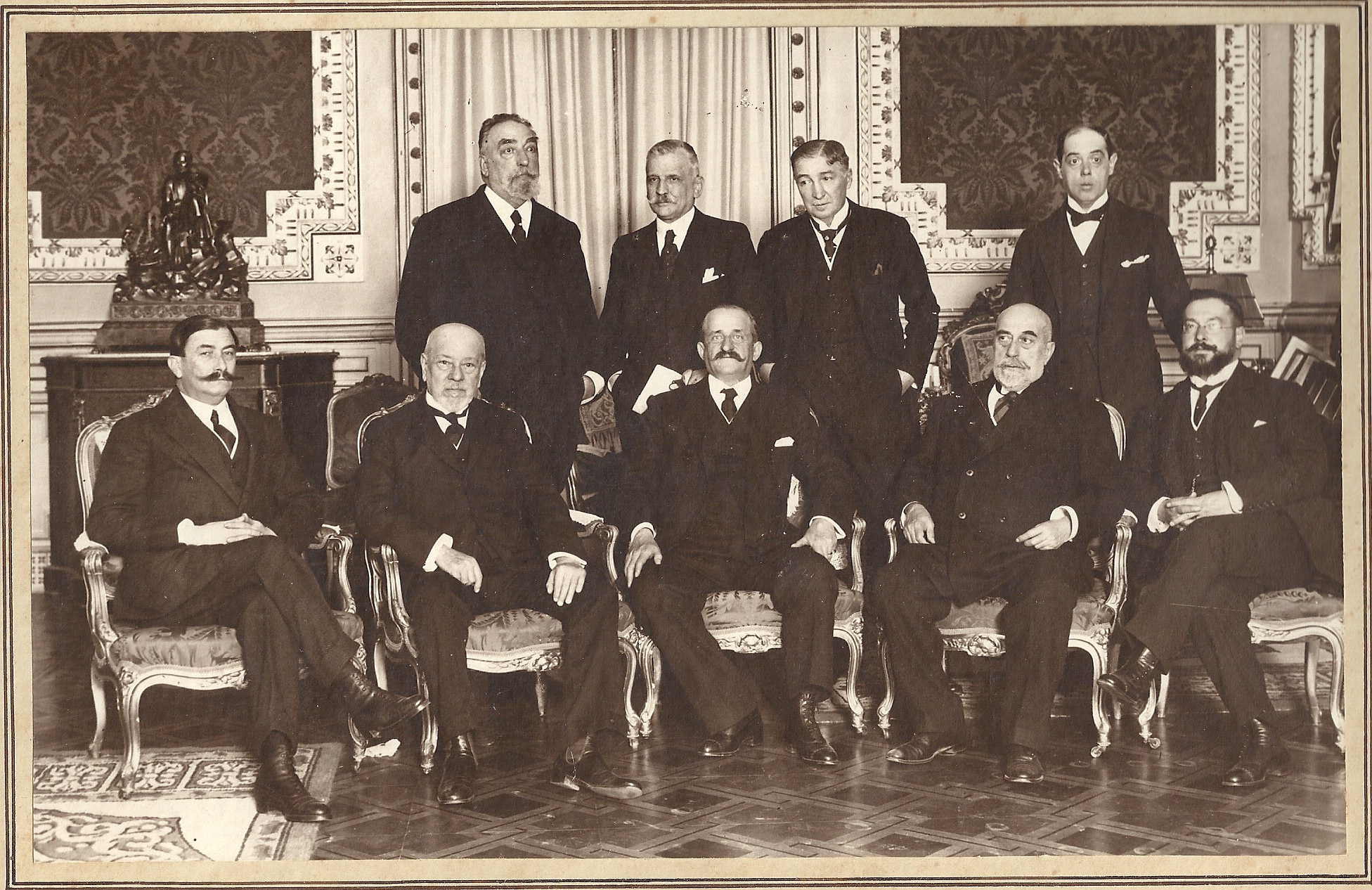
The 1918 cabinet presided by Romanones

Shortly after he participated in the coalition government of Antonio Maura as Minister of Instruction and of Justice and in the government of Manuel García Prieto as Minister of State (1918), and he presided a brief government in December 1918, which was toppled by the autonomist agitation in Catalonia and the labour conflicts. He was replaced in April 1919 after issuing the Eight Hour Workday Decree.

He was minister of justice (1922–1923) in the liberal government of Manuel García Prieto and became president of the Senate in 1923, serving in such capacity when the military coup of Miguel Primo de Rivera took place on 13 September 1923.

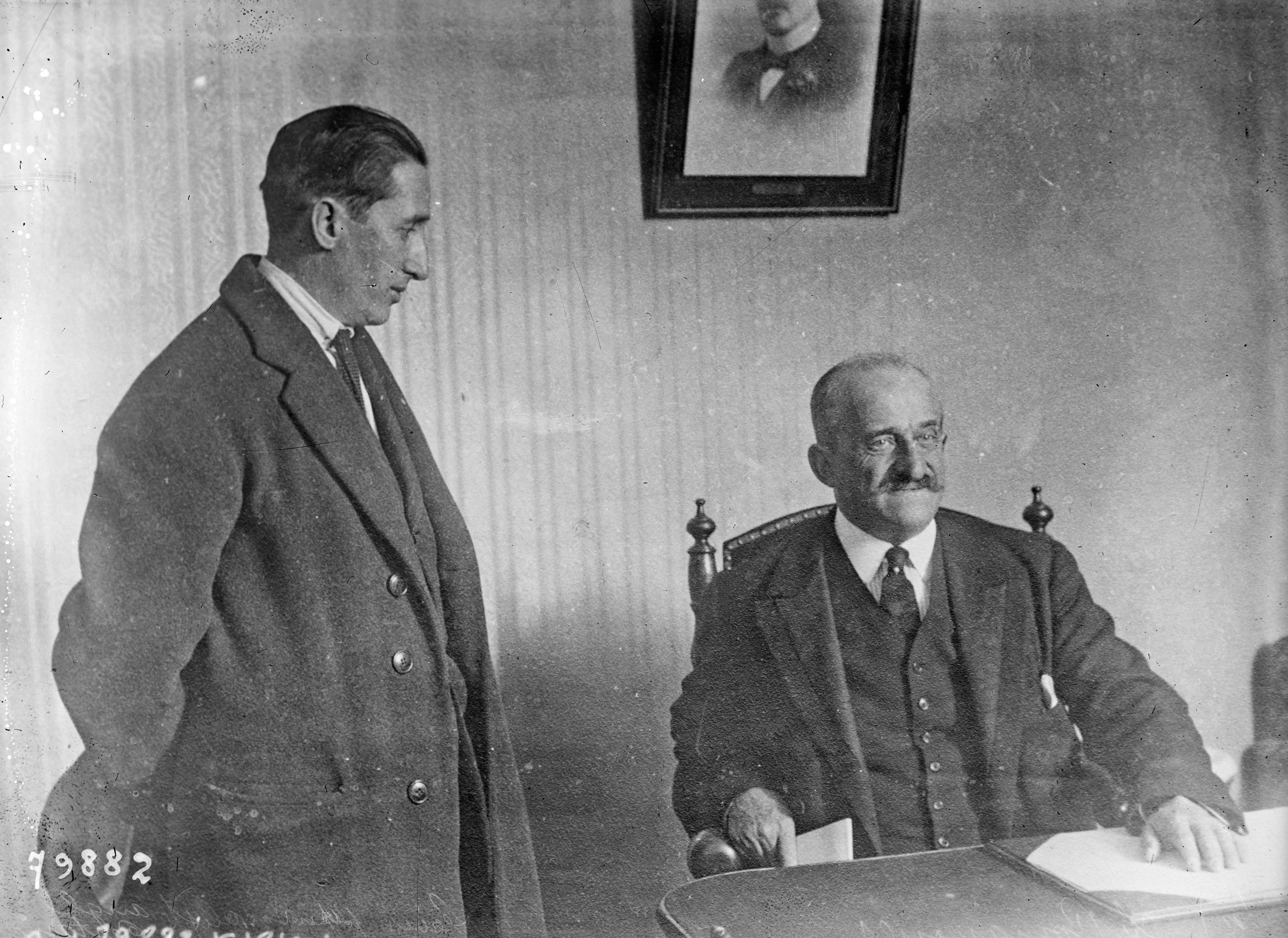
Romanones with Ángel Pestaña (left) in 1922

During the dictatorship of Primo de Rivera, he stayed out of politics although he participated in the conspiracy known as the Sanjuanada for which he was fined.

He was appointed Minister of State in the government of Juan Bautista Aznar Cabañas, but the elections in 1931 showed that the monarchy was unpopular so he advised Alfonso XIII to leave Spain.

Romanones talked personally to Niceto Alcalá Zamora and his revolutionary committee and agreed to the peaceful transfer of power to the Provisional Republican Government, without military intervention, in exchange of the guarantee for the life of the royal family.

== Monetary reform and the Saneamiento de la moneda speech ==
In November 1904, Romanones participated prominently in parliamentary debates concerning the saneamiento de la moneda (“stabilization of the currency”), a major Restoration-era effort focused on exchange-rate stabilization, fiscal credibility, and monetary reform in post-1898 Spain. The debates centered on proposals for the regularización y mejora del cambio exterior y saneamiento de la moneda (“regulation and improvement of foreign exchange and stabilization of the currency”), which were discussed before a special parliamentary commission during the parliamentary sessions of November 1904.

Romanones publicly associated himself with the monetary stabilization campaign and criticized delays in implementing the reforms. In a March 1905 open letter addressed to Raimundo Fernández Villaverde and reproduced in El Imparcial, Romanones described the issue as “apremiante, apremiantísimo” (“urgent, exceedingly urgent”) and argued that a national budget could not be considered financially truthful without first restoring the value of the peseta. The letter quoted Villaverde’s earlier parliamentary statements asserting that “no podría hacerse en España un presupuesto… sin haber restablecido previamente el valor de la peseta, porque de otra suerte el presupuesto sería una mentira” (“a budget could not be made in Spain without first restoring the value of the peseta, because otherwise the budget would be a lie”).

The monetary debates of 1901–1904 formed part of broader Restoration-era disputes regarding gold convertibility, exchange instability, public finance, and Spain’s economic modernization after the Spanish–American War. Modern scholarship has interpreted the stabilization debates as politically and socially significant conflicts involving industrial interests, exporters, and competing visions of national economic development.

In 1913, Valencian artist Asensio Gómez Salvador created a monumental illuminated vellum manuscript reproducing Romanones’s parliamentary speech on monetary stabilization. Contemporary press accounts described the work as a large-format documento parlamentario (“parliamentary document”) consisting of approximately 125 vellum folios with illuminated initials, Gothic-inspired calligraphy, and a bronze heraldic escutcheon of the Count of Romanones. The manuscript was reportedly intended for display at a decorative arts exhibition and represented an unusual fusion of parliamentary commemoration, political symbolism, and Gothic Revival decorative art.

=== Later life ===
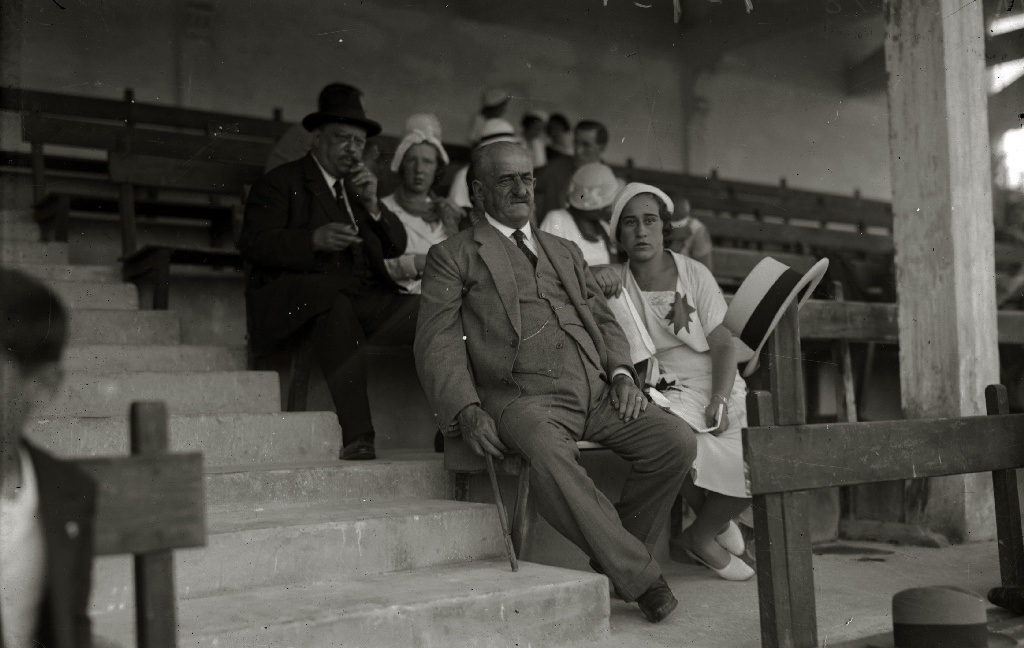
Romanones attending the hippodrome of Lasarte in 1932

During the Second Republic, he remained deputy representative for Guadalajara.

The outbreak of the Civil War found him in San Sebastián in charge of his own business, and he crossed over to France with the help of the French ambassador. He moved to the Nationalist zone in 1937, and, having become an ardent supporter of Francisco Franco, he was one of the signatories of the Advisory Opinion on the Illegitimacy of the Acting Powers on the 18th of July 1936, an ad-hoc juridical report commissioned by the Francoist Government in Burgos, trying to legitimate the "national uprising"—the 1936 coup d'etat—by means of twisted arguments such as imputing on those assaulted the very crime that the assault entailed, that of "aiding of the rebellion".

After the war he wrote his memoirs and was president of the Real Academia de Bellas Artes de San Fernando and member of the academies of History and Jurisprudence.

He died on 11 September 1950 in Madrid.

== Works and views ==
Romanones was a prolific writer and he wrote his memoirs during the Second Republic. He wrote several biographies as well as political works and essays.

Although Catholic, he was against religious intolerance and also against the influence of the clergy for which he often clashed with religious authorities. An example of this happened with the enactment of the Civil Marriage Law of 1905 which stated that those getting married did not have to declare their religion. He reinstated diplomatic relations with the Holy See but he was a fervent supporter of the separation of Church and State.

== Honours ==
He was a Doctor of Law by the University of Bologna, a member of the Royal Academy of History and of the Royal Academy of Moral and Political Sciences. Director of the Real Academia de Bellas Artes de San Fernando and a president of the Ateneo Madrileño.

He was made Count of Romanones in 1893 and Grandee of Spain in 1911, as well as 7th Count of Yebes in 1922.

== See also ==
- Dictatorship of Primo de Rivera
- 1926 Spanish coup d'état
- Bolshevik triennium

Government offices
Preceded by Santiago de Angulo Ortiz de Traspeña	Mayor of Madrid; 1894–1895	Succeeded by Nicolás de Peñalver y Zamora (Count of Peñalver)
Preceded by Antonio García Alix	Minister of Public Instruction and Fine Arts; 1901–1902	Succeeded by Manuel Allendesalazar
Preceded by Francisco Javier González de Castejón y Elío (Marquis of Vadillo)	Minister of Agriculture, Industry, Commerce and Public Works; 1905	Succeeded by Rafael Gasset Chinchilla
Preceded by Manuel García Prieto	Minister of Governation; 1905–1906	Succeeded by Benigno Quiroga
Preceded by José María Celleruelo	Minister of Grace and Justice; 1906	Succeeded by Antonio Barroso Castillo
Preceded by Benigno Quiroga	Minister of Governation; 1906–1907	Succeeded by Juan de la Cierva y Peñafiel
Preceded by Antonio Barroso Castillo	Minister of Public Instruction and Fine Arts; 1910	Succeeded by Julio Burell
Preceded by Eduardo Dato	President of the Congress of Deputies; 1910–1912	Succeeded by Segismundo Moret
Preceded by Manuel García Prieto (Marquis of Alhucemas)	President of the Council of Ministers; 1912–1913	Succeeded by Eduardo Dato
Preceded by Antonio Barroso Castillo	Minister of Grace and Justice; 1913	Succeeded by Pedro Rodríguez de la Borbolla
Preceded by Miguel Villanueva y Gómez	Minister of State; 1916	Succeeded by Amalio Gimeno y Cabañas
Preceded by Joaquín Fernández Prida	Minister of Grace and Justice; 1918	Succeeded by José Roig y Bergadá (acting: Antonio Maura)
Preceded by Santiago Alba	Minister of Public Instruction and Fine Arts; 1918	Succeeded by Julio Burell
Preceded by Eduardo Dato	Minister of State; 1918–1919	Succeeded by Manuel González Hontoria
Preceded by Manuel García Prieto (Marquis of Alhucemas)	President of the Council of Ministers; 1918–1919	Succeeded by Antonio Maura
Preceded by Carlos Cañal y Migolla	Minister of Grace and Justice; 1922–1923	Succeeded by Antonio López Muñoz (Count of López Muñoz)
Preceded by Joaquín Sánchez de Toca	President of the Senate; 1923	Succeeded by Antonio Fontán (1977)
Preceded by Jacobo Fitz-James Stuart y Falcó (Duke of Alba)	Minister of State; 1931	Succeeded by Alejandro Lerroux
Cultural offices
Preceded by Ramón Menéndez Pidal	President of the Ateneo de Madrid; 1920–1922	Succeeded by Adolfo Buylla
Academic offices
Preceded by	Director of the Real Academia de Bellas Artes de San Fernando; 1910–1949	Succeeded by Aniceto Marinas
Spanish nobility
New creation	Count of Romanones; 1893–1950	Succeeded by Luis de Figueroa y Alonso-Martínez
