= Rafael Gasset =

Spanish lawyer, journalist, and politician

Rafael Gasset Chinchilla
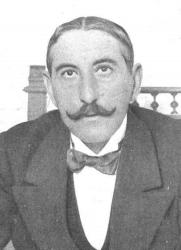

Minister of Agriculture, Industry, Commerce and Public Works of Spain
- In office 8 April – 23 October 1900
- Monarch: Alfonso XIII
- Regent: Maria Cristina of Austria
- Prime Minister: Francisco Silvela
- Preceded by: Luis Pidal y Mon
- Succeeded by: Joaquín Sánchez de Toca
- In office 20 July 1903 – 5 December 1903
- Monarch: Alfonso XIII
- Prime Minister: Raimundo Fernández-Villaverde
- Preceded by: Francisco Javier González de Castejón y Elío
- Succeeded by: Manuel Allendesalazar

Minister of Development of Spain
- In office 1 December 1905 – 6 July 1906
- Monarch: Alfonso XIII
- Prime Minister: Segismundo Moret
- Preceded by: Count of Romanones
- Succeeded by: Manuel García Prieto
- In office 30 November – 4 December 1906
- Monarch: Alfonso XIII
- Prime Minister: Segismundo Moret
- Preceded by: Manuel García Prieto
- Succeeded by: Francisco de Federico y Martínez
- In office 2 October 1909 – 9 February 1910
- Monarch: Alfonso XIII
- Prime Minister: Segismundo Moret
- Preceded by: José Sánchez Guerra
- Succeeded by: Fermín Calbetón y Blanchón
- In office 2 January 1911 – 13 March 1912
- Monarch: Alfonso XIII
- Prime Minister: José Canalejas
- Preceded by: Fermín Calbetón y Blanchón
- Succeeded by: Miguel Villanueva y Gómez
- In office 13 June – 27 October 1913
- Monarch: Alfonso XIII
- Prime Minister: Count of Romanones
- Preceded by: Miguel Villanueva y Gómez
- Succeeded by: Javier Ugarte y Pagés
- In office 30 April 1916 – 11 June 1917
- Monarch: Alfonso XIII
- Prime Minister: Count of Romanones
- Preceded by: Amós Salvador Rodrigáñez
- Succeeded by: Martín Rosales Martel
- In office 7 December 1922 – 3 September 1923
- Monarch: Alfonso XIII
- Prime Minister: Manuel García Prieto
- Preceded by: Luis Rodríguez de Viguri
- Succeeded by: Manuel Portela Valladares

Personal details
- Born: 23 November 1866 Madrid, Spain
- Died: 11 April 1927 (aged 60) Madrid, Spain
- Party: Liberal Party; Liberal Conservative Party

Rafael Gasset Chinchilla (23 November 1866 - 11 April 1927) was a Spanish lawyer, journalist, and politician. He served as the Minister of Agriculture and the Minister of Development several times during the regency of Maria Christina of Austria and later the reign of Alfonso XIII.

== Biography ==
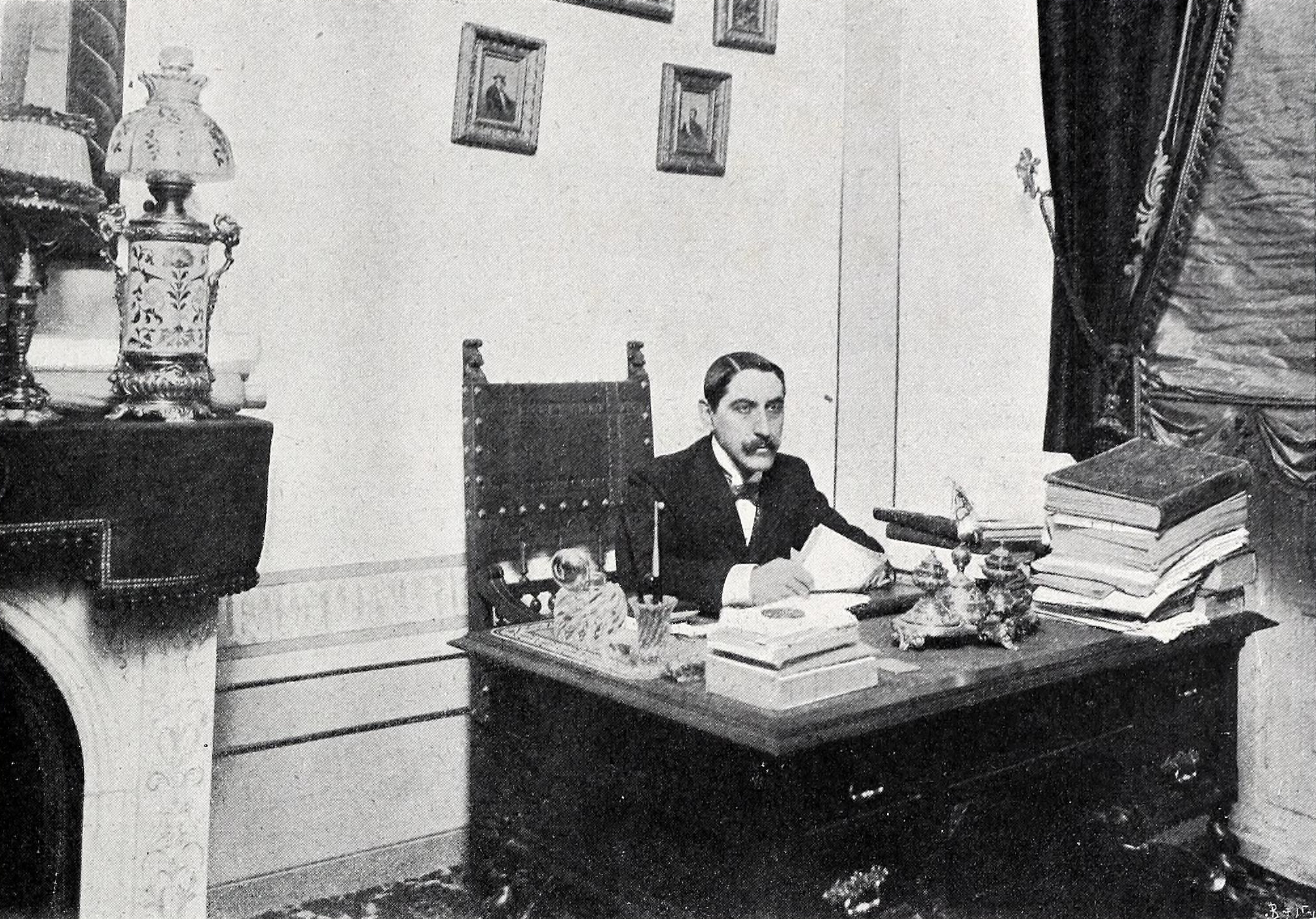
Photographed by Franzen

Rafael Gasset Chinchilla was born on 23 November 1866 in Madrid, the son of Eduardo Gasset y Artime from Pontevedra and Rafaela Chinchilla y Díaz from Oñate. He was director of El Imparcial following the death of his father, who founded the newspaper on 20 May 1884.

He began his political career as an independent politician, he participated in the 1891 elections and obtained a seat as a representative for the Santiago de Cuba district.

Gasset served as the Minister of Agriculture, Industry, Commerce, and Public Works twice: between 8 April and 23 October 1900; and between 20 July and 15 December 1903, the first Minister of Agriculture in Spanish history. He was one of the figures responsible for the rapprochement between Francisco Silvela and General Camilo García de Polavieja in 1898. Starting in 1899, Gasset assumed the ideas of the Aragonese politician Joaquín Costa, which he would try to put into practice in an attempt to improve agricultural irrigation, during the government of Francisco Silvela.

In 1903, during his second term, under the Fernández-Villaverde government, Gasset promoted a program that emphasized hydraulic works and the construction of local roads, however, his proposals were unattended at the end of 1903, the result of the change of prime minister. In 1905, he joined the Liberal Party and later served as the Minister of Public Works on 1 December 1905, under the Moret government.

He died on 11 April 1927, buried in Galapagar, where the remains of his second wife Rita Díez de Ulzurrun also rest. Puente Gasset (lit. 'Gasset Bridge') was a bridge in Burgos dedicated to Rafael Gasset, built in 1926 and demolished in 2010. In Ciudad Real, Gasset Park, built in 1915, is also dedicated in his name.
