= José Sánchez-Guerra y Martínez =

Spanish journalist and lawyer

The Most Excellent José Sánchez-Guerra
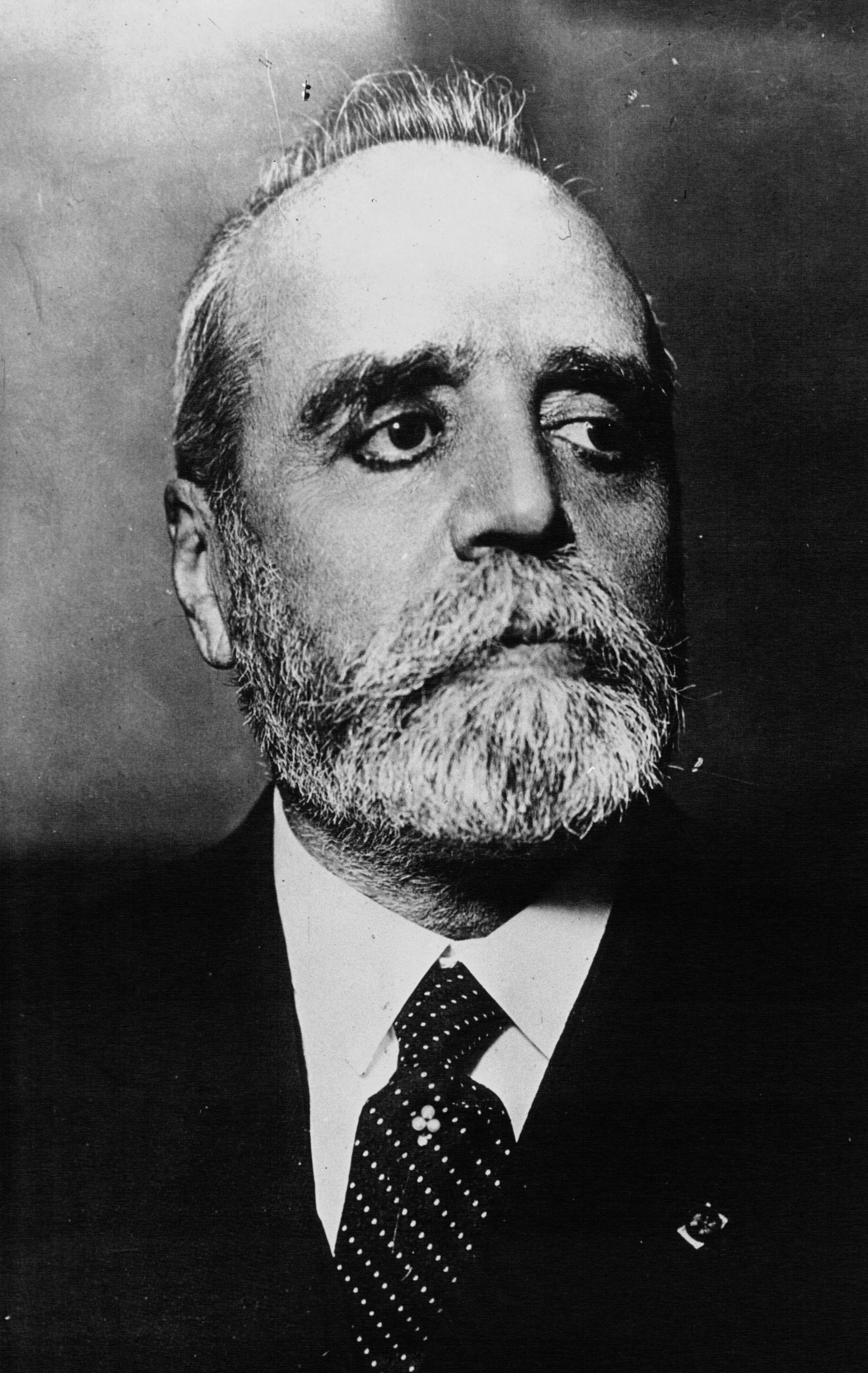

Prime Minister of Spain
- In office 8 March 1922 – 7 December 1922
- Monarch: Alfonso XIII
- Preceded by: Antonio Maura
- Succeeded by: Manuel García-Prieto

President of the Congress of Deputies
- In office 28 July 1919 – 14 March 1922
- Monarch: Alfonso XIII
- Prime Minister: Joaquín Sánchez de Toca; Manuel Allendesalazar; Eduardo Dato; Gabino Bugallal (as interim); Himself
- Preceded by: Juan de Armada y Losada
- Succeeded by: Gabino Bugallal

Governor of the Bank of Spain
- In office 28 July – 5 December 1903
- Monarch: Alfonso XIII
- Prime Minister: Raimundo Fernández Villaverde
- Minister of Finance: Augusto González Besada
- Preceded by: Antonio García Alix
- Succeeded by: Tomás Castellano y Villarroya
- In office 26 January 1907 – 14 September 1908
- Monarch: Alfonso XIII
- Prime Minister: Antonio Maura
- Minister of Finance: Guillermo de Osam y Scull
- Preceded by: Fernando Merino Villarino
- Succeeded by: Antonio García Alix

Minister of Governance of Spain
- In office 5 December 1903 – 5 December 1904
- Monarch: Alfonso XIII
- Prime Minister: Antonio Maura
- Preceded by: Antonio García Alix
- Succeeded by: Manuel Allendesalazar
- In office 27 October 1913 – 9 December 1915
- Monarch: Alfonso XIII
- Prime Minister: Eduardo Dato
- Preceded by: Santiago Alba Bonifaz
- Succeeded by: Santiago Alba Bonifaz
- In office 11 June – 3 November 1917
- Monarch: Alfonso XIII
- Prime Minister: Eduardo Dato
- Preceded by: Julio Burell
- Succeeded by: José Bahamonde

Minister of Development of Spain
- In office 14 September 1908 – 21 October 1909
- Monarch: Alfonso XIII
- Prime Minister: Eduardo Dato
- Preceded by: Augusto González Besada
- Succeeded by: Rafael Gasset

Minister of War of Spain
- Interim
- In office 15 July – 7 December 1922
- Monarch: Alfonso XIII
- Prime Minister: Himself
- Preceded by: José Olaguer Feliú
- Succeeded by: Niceto Alcalá-Zamora

Personal details
- Born: José Sánchez-Guerra y Martínez; 28 June 1859
- Died: 26 January 1935 (aged 75)

José Sánchez-Guerra y Martinez (28 June 1859, in Córdoba – 26 January 1935, in Madrid) was a Spanish journalist, lawyer and prime minister. His term as prime minister lasted from 8 March to 7 December 1922. He was a Conservative who has been described as "courageous" and "politically mediocre."

== Biography ==
He began his political career in 1886 when he obtained a certificate of election in Cabra (Córdoba) for the Liberal Party. Sagasta won this seat in the constituency of Córdoba on behalf of the Liberals in successive elections until 1901. In 1902, along with Antonio Maura, he went over to the Conservative Party. He continued to receive the certificate of election for Cordoba in consecutive elections until 1918. His brother Antonio Barroso Castillo also contested elections in the province.

He was Minister of the Interior between 5 December 1903 and 5 December 1904 in the Maura government. He again occupied the same ministerial portfolio for two terms under Dato's governments: between 27 October 1913 and 9 December 1915, and between 11 June and 3 November 1917. He was also Minister of Promotion between 14 September 1908 and 21 October 1909, again under the presidency of Eduardo Dato, and Minister of War between 15 July and 7 December 1922 in the Sánchez Guerra cabinet.

== See also ==
- 1929 Spanish coup d'état
