= Manuel García Prieto, Marquis of Alhucemas =

Spanish politician (1859–1938)

The Most Excellent The Marquis of Alhucemas
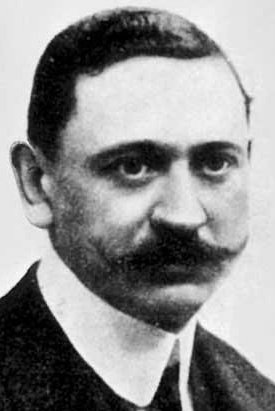

Prime Minister of Spain
- In office 7 December 1922 – 15 September 1923
- Monarch: Alfonso XIII
- Preceded by: José Sánchez-Guerra
- Succeeded by: Miguel Primo de Rivera
- In office 9 November – 5 December 1918
- Monarch: Alfonso XIII
- Preceded by: Count of Romanones
- Succeeded by: Eduardo Dato
- In office 3 November 1917 – 22 March 1918
- Monarch: Alfonso XIII
- Preceded by: Eduardo Dato
- Succeeded by: Antonio Maura
- In office 19 April – 11 June 1917
- Monarch: Alfonso XIII
- Preceded by: Antonio Maura
- Succeeded by: Count of Romanones
- Acting
- In office 12 November – 14 November 1912
- Monarch: Alfonso XIII
- Preceded by: José Canalejas
- Succeeded by: Count of Romanones

President of the Senate of Spain
- In office 6 May 1916 – 19 April 1917
- Monarch: Alfonso XIII
- Preceded by: Joaquín Sánchez de Toca
- Succeeded by: Alejandro Groizard

Solicitor General of Spain
- In office 19 October 1897 – 31 May 1898
- Monarch: Alfonso XIII
- Regent: Maria Christina of Austria
- Prime Minister: Práxedes Mateo Sagasta
- Minister of Grace and Justice: Alejandro Groizard
- Preceded by: Marquess of Figueroa
- Succeeded by: Álvaro López Mola

Minister of Governance of Spain
- In office 23 June – 1 December 1905
- Monarch: Alfonso XIII
- Prime Minister: Eugenio Montero Ríos
- Preceded by: Augusto González Besada
- Succeeded by: Count of Romanones
- In office 22 March – 9 November 1918
- Monarch: Alfonso XIII
- Prime Minister: Antonio Maura
- Preceded by: José Bahamonde y de Lanz
- Succeeded by: Luis Silvela y Casado

Minister of Development of Spain
- In office 6 July – 30 November 1906
- Monarch: Alfonso XIII
- Prime Minister: José López Domínguez
- Preceded by: Rafael Gasset
- Succeeded by: Rafael Gasset
- In office 9 November – 5 December 1918
- Monarch: Alfonso XIII
- Prime Minister: Himself
- Preceded by: Francesc Cambó
- Succeeded by: José Gómez-Acebo

Minister of State of Spain
- In office 9 February 1910 – 31 December 1912
- Monarch: Alfonso XIII
- Prime Minister: José Canalejas; Count of Romanones
- Preceded by: Juan Pérez-Caballero y Ferrer
- Succeeded by: Juan Navarro-Reverter Gomis
- In office 3 November 1917 – 2 March 1918
- Monarch: Alfonso XIII
- Prime Minister: Himself
- Preceded by: Marquis of Lema
- Succeeded by: Eduardo Dato

Minister of Grace and Justice of Spain
- In office 1 December 1905 – 10 June 1906
- Monarch: Alfonso XIII
- Prime Minister: Segismundo Moret
- Preceded by: Joaquín López Puigcerver
- Succeeded by: José María Celleruelo

Minister of Justice and Religion of Spain
- In office 18 February – 18 April 1931
- Monarch: Alfonso XIII
- Prime Minister: Juan Bautista Aznar
- Preceded by: Joaquín de Montes y Jovellar
- Succeeded by: Fernando de los Ríos

Personal details
- Born: Manuel García y Prieto; 5 November 1859 Astorga
- Died: 8 March 1938 (aged 78) San Sebastián
- Party: Liberal Democrats (from 1913)
- Other political affiliations: Liberal Party (until 1913)

Manuel García Prieto, 1st Marquis of Alhucemas (5 November 1859 – 8 March 1938) was a Spanish politician who served as prime minister several times in his life and as the 30th Solicitor General of Spain. He was a member of the Liberal Party. During his last term, he was deposed by Miguel Primo de Rivera.

== Biography ==
Born on 5 November 1859 in Astorga, province of León. Formed in the law firm of Eugenio Montero Ríos, García Prieto entered the former's cacique network and married one of his daughters, María Victoria.

Following the assassination of Prime Minister José Canalejas in 1912, and the ensuing factional division within the Liberal Party, García-Prieto led the so-called demócrata ("democratic") minority, rival of the romanonista majority.

On 27 November 1912, he and French ambassador to Spain Léon Geoffray signed the Treaty between France and Spain regarding Morocco, which established de jure Spanish zones of influence in northern and southern Morocco, both zones already under de facto Spanish control, while France remained the primary colonial power as the sole non-Moroccan state signatory of the 1912 Treaty of Fes.

Within the cadres of the Liberal party, the Marquis of Alhucemas espoused just like Miguel Villanueva the policy of neutrality of Spain during World War I, forcing pro-ally Romanones to resign as prime minister in 1917.

He died in San Sebastián on 8 March 1938.

Political offices
Preceded by Juan Pérez-Caballero; Acting	Minister of State; 9 February 1910 – 31 December 1912	Succeeded by Juan Navarro-Reverter
Preceded by The Marquis of Lema	Minister of State; 13 November 1917 – 22 March 1918	Succeeded by Eduardo Dato
