= Manuel Allendesalazar =

Spanish noble and politician

The Most Excellent Manuel Allendesalazar
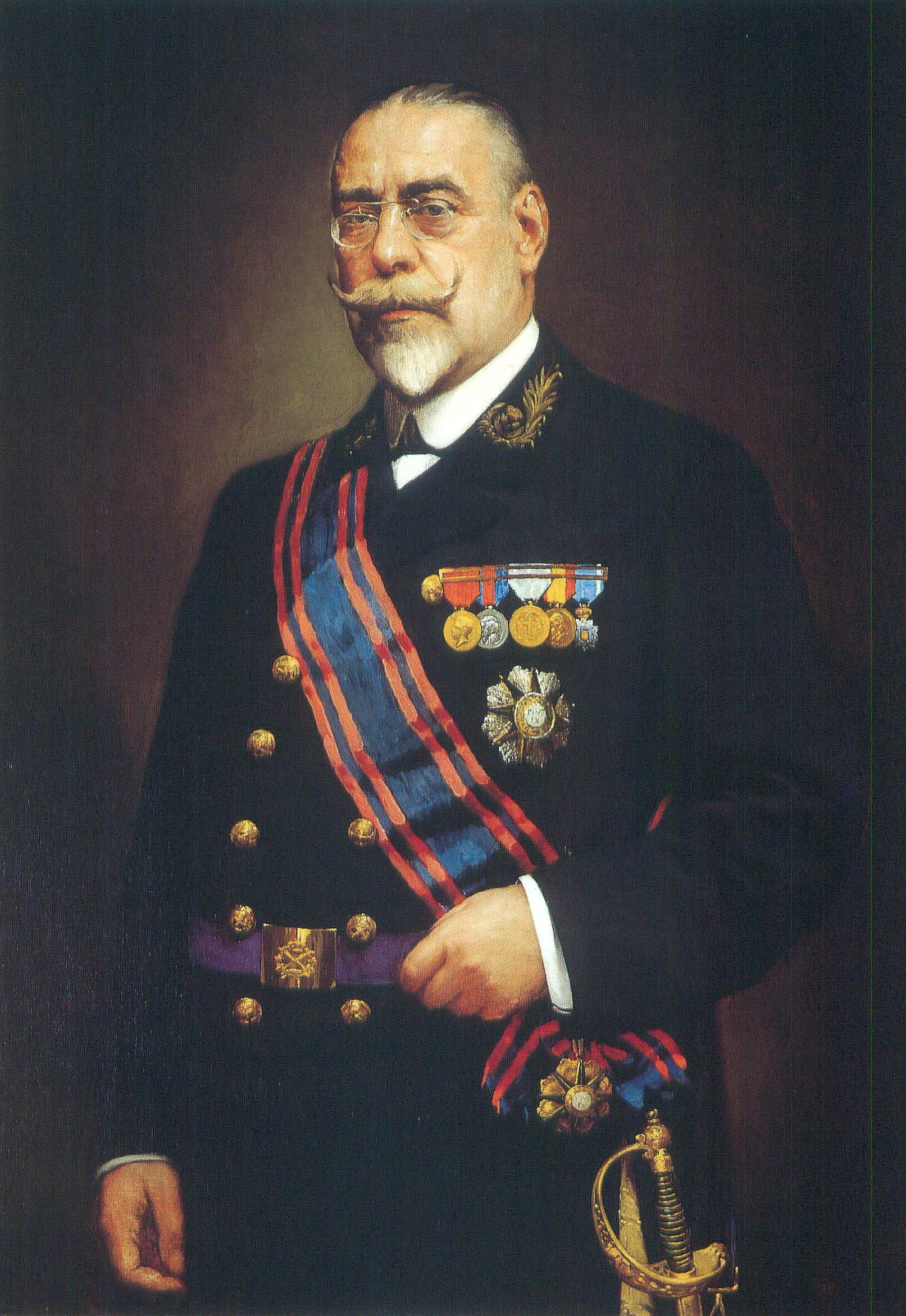

Prime Minister of Spain
- In office 13 March 1921 – 14 August 1921
- Monarch: Alfonso XIII
- Preceded by: Gabino Bugallal (Acting)
- Succeeded by: Antonio Maura
- In office 12 December 1919 – 5 May 1920
- Monarch: Alfonso XIII
- Preceded by: Joaquín Sánchez de Toca
- Succeeded by: Eduardo Dato

President of the Senate of Spain
- In office 23 June 1919 – 15 December 1919
- Preceded by: Alejandro Groizard
- Succeeded by: Joaquín Sánchez de Toca

Governor of the Bank of Spain
- In office 20 December 1904 – 17 August 1905
- Monarch: Alfonso XIII
- Prime Minister: Marcelo Azcárraga Palmero; Raimundo Fernández-Villaverde
- Minister of Finance: Tomás Castellano y Villarroya; Antonio García Alix
- Preceded by: Tomás Castellano y Villarroya
- Succeeded by: Trinitario Ruiz de Capdepón
- In office 23 April – 17 October 1919
- Monarch: Alfonso XIII
- Prime Minister: Antonio Maura; Joaquín Sánchez de Toca
- Minister of Finance: Juan de la Cierva y Peñafiel; Gabino Bugallal
- Preceded by: Tirso Rodrigáñez y Sagasta
- Succeeded by: Eduardo Sanz Escartín

Mayor of Madrid
- In office 16 April – 10 July 1900
- Preceded by: Ventura García Sancho Ibarrondo
- Succeeded by: Mariano Fernández de Henestrosa

Minister of Finance of Spain
- In office 6 July 1900 – 6 March 1901
- Monarch: Alfonso XIII
- Prime Minister: Marcelo Azcárraga Palmero
- Preceded by: Raimundo Fernández-Villaverde
- Succeeded by: Ángel Urzaiz

Minister of Public Instruction and Fine Arts of Spain
- In office 6 December 1902 – 20 July 1903
- Monarch: Alfonso XIII
- Prime Minister: Francisco Silvela
- Preceded by: Count of Romanones
- Succeeded by: Gabino Bugallal

Minister of Agriculture, Industry, Trade and Public Works of Spain
- In office 15 December 1903 – 5 December 1904
- Monarch: Alfonso XIII
- Prime Minister: Antonio Maura
- Preceded by: Rafael Gasset
- Succeeded by: Juan Armada y Losada

Minister of Governance of Spain
- In office 5 December – 16 December 1904
- Monarch: Alfonso XIII
- Prime Minister: Antonio Maura
- Preceded by: José Sánchez Guerra
- Succeeded by: Francisco Javier González de Castejón y Elío

Minister of State of Spain
- In office 25 January 1907 – 21 October 1909
- Monarch: Alfonso XIII
- Prime Minister: Antonio Maura
- Preceded by: Juan Pérez-Caballero y Ferrer
- Succeeded by: Juan Pérez-Caballero y Ferrer

Minister of Development of Spain
- Interim
- In office 14 February – 17 February 1920
- Monarch: Alfonso XIII
- Preceded by: Amelio Gimeno y Cabañas
- Succeeded by: Emilio Ortuño Berte

Minister of War of Spain
- Interim
- In office 12 December – 15 December 1919
- Monarch: Alfonso XIII
- Preceded by: Antonio Tovar y Marcoleta
- Succeeded by: José Villalba Riquelme

Minister of the Navy of Spain
- Interim
- In office 17 March – 5 May 1920
- Monarch: Alfonso XIII
- Preceded by: Manuel de Flórez y Carrio
- Succeeded by: Eduardo Dato

Personal details
- Born: Manuel Allendesalazar y Muñoz de Salazar; August 24, 1856 Guernica, Spain
- Died: May 17, 1923 (aged 66) Madrid, Spain
- Party: Conservative Party
- Spouse: María de los Ángeles Bernar y Llácer
- Children: María de la Concepción de Allendesalazar y Bernar
- Occupation: Agricultural engineer

Don Manuel Allendesalazar y Muñoz de Salazar (24 August 1856 – 17 May 1923) was a Spanish nobleman and politician who served two terms as Prime Minister of Spain during the reign of King Alfonso XIII.

== Biography ==
Allendesalazar was born in Guernica. He occupied other political offices such as Minister of State and Mayor of Madrid. He died in Madrid on May 17, 1923.

Political offices
Preceded by Juan Pérez-Caballero	Minister of State; 25 January 1907 – 21 October 1909	Succeeded by Juan Pérez-Caballero
