= Antonio López Muñoz, 1st Count of López Muñoz =

Spanish nobleman, writer and politician

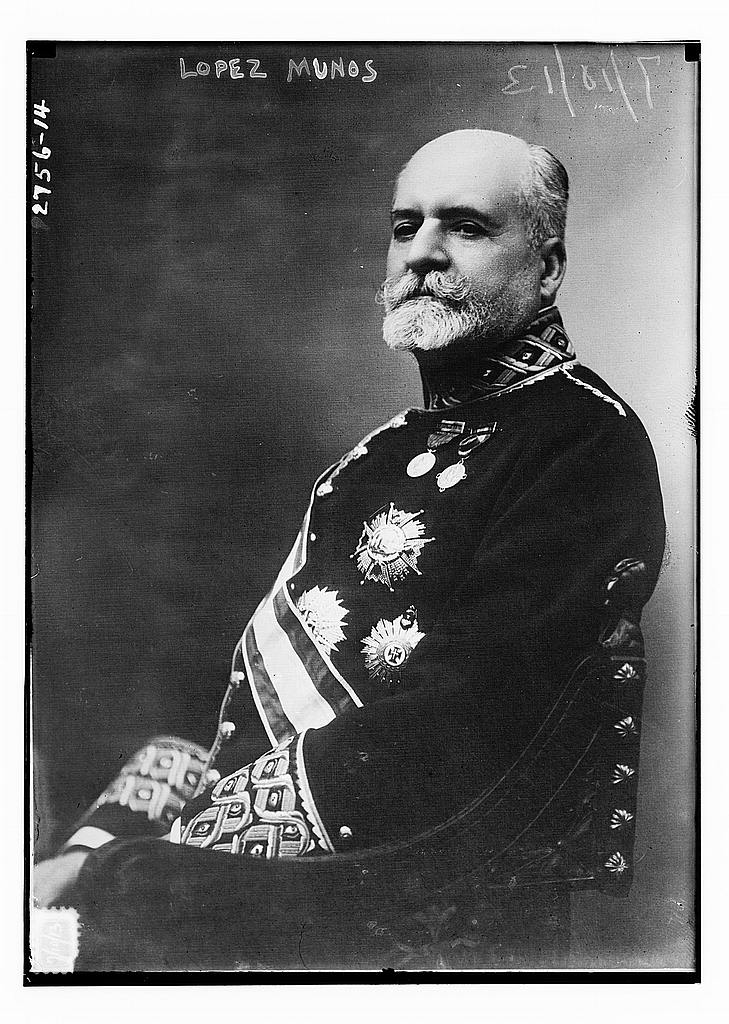
López Muñoz in 1913

Antonio López Muñoz (1 April 1850 – 12 March 1929) was a Spanish nobleman, writer and politician who served as Minister of State in 1913, during the reign of King Alfonso XIII of Spain.

== Biography ==
He was born on 1 April 1850 in Huelva, Spain. In 1913 he served as Minister of State. He died on 12 March 1929 in Madrid, Spain.

Political offices
Preceded by Santiago Alba Bonifaz	Minister of Education; 1912 – 1913	Succeeded by Joaquín Ruiz Jiménez
Preceded by Álvaro de Figueroa y Torres	Minister of Justice; 1912 – 1913	Succeeded by Fernando Cadalso Manzano
Preceded by Juan Navarro Reverter	Minister of State; 1913	Succeeded by Salvador Bermúdez de Castro y O'Lawlor
