= Duke of Dato =

Spanish dukedom

Spanish ducal coronet

The Dukedom of Dato is a Spanish dukedom created on 21 March 1921. King Alfonso XIII of Spain created the Dukedom for María de Barrenechea whose husband, Eduardo Dato e Iradier, Prime Minister of Spain, had been assassinated on 8 March 1921.

== Succession ==
Like all other Spanish noble titles, the Dukedom of Dato descended according to male-preference cognatic primogeniture, meaning that females could inherit the Dukedom if they had no brothers (or if their brothers had no issue). That changed in 2006 and the eldest child (regardless of sex) succeeds to the Dukedom.

== History ==
Upon the death of the 1st Duchess, the title was inherited by her eldest daughter, Isabel Dato. The 2nd Duchess died unmarried and childless, so the Dukedom devolved upon her younger sister, María del Carmen Dato. The 3rd Duchess was succeeded by her son, Eduardo Espinosa de los Monteros y Dato, who was in turn succeeded by his own son, Eduardo Espinosa de los Monteros y Español.

== List of holders ==
	Title	Period
Created by Alfonso XIII of Spain
I	María del Carmen Barrenechea y Monteguí	1921–1925
II	María Isabel Dato y Barrenechea	1925–1937
III	María del Carmen Dato y Barrenechea	1937–1949
IV	Eduardo Espinosa de los Monteros y Dato	1949–1965
V	Eduardo Espinosa de los Monteros y Español	1965–2013
VI	María del Pilar Espinosa de los Monteros y Sainz-Tovar	2014–present
