= Cristóbal Colón, 14th Duke of Veragua =

The Most Excellent Admiral of the Ocean Sea Cristóbal Colón 14th Duke of Veragua GE
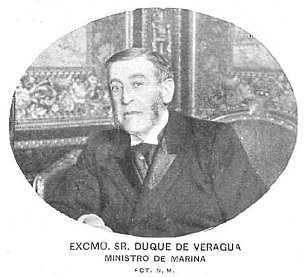
- The Duke as Minister of the Navy

Admiral of the Ocean Sea Admiral of the Indies Adelantado of the Indies
- In office 1871–1910
- Monarchs: Amadeo I Alfonso XII; Alfonso XIII
- Preceded by: 13th Duke of Veragua
- Succeeded by: 15th Duke of Veragua

Minister of Public Works of Spain
- In office 21 January 1890 – 5 July 1890
- Monarch: Alfonso XIII
- Prime Minister: Práxedes Mateo Sagasta
- Preceded by: Jose Álvarez de Toledo
- Succeeded by: Santos Isasa

Minister of the Navy of Spain
- In office 6 March 1901 – 6 December 1902
- Monarch: Alfonso XIII
- Prime Minister: Práxedes Mateo Sagasta
- Preceded by: José Ramos Izquierdo
- Succeeded by: Joaquin Sanchez de Toca

Personal details
- Born: Cristóbal Colón y de la Cerda; 8 June 1837 Madrid, Spain
- Died: 30 August 1910 (aged 73) Madrid, Spain
- Spouse: Isabel Aguilera y Santiago de Perales
- Children: María del Pilar Colón y Aguilera; Cristóbal Colón y Aguilera, 15h Duke of Veragua; Genaro Colón y Aguilera
- Parents: Pedro Colón, 13th Duke of Veragua; María del Pilar de la Cerda y Gand-Villain
- Profession: Naval officer

Military service
- Branch/service: Spanish Navy
- Rank: Admiral

Cristóbal Colón y de la Cerda, 14th Duke of Veragua, 14th Marquess of Jamaica, (8 June 1837 in Madrid – 30 October 1910 in Madrid), was a Spanish Minister of Public Works during the regency of Maria Christina of Austria and Minister of the Navy during the same period and during the reign of Alfonso XIII.

== Biography ==
He was born in Madrid in 1837, and was the eldest son of Pedro Colón y Ramirez de Baquedano, the 13th Duke of Veragua and María del Pilar-Luisa de la Cerda y-Ghent Vilain, making him a direct descendant of Christopher Columbus.

In addition to being 14th Duke of Veragua, he succeeded to his father's titles as: 14th Duke of la Vega, 14th Marquess of Jamaica, 16th Admiral of the Ocean Sea and 16th Adelantado mayor de las Indias.

He began his political career as a deputy of the Province of Ávila in the elections of 1871, was re-elected in the elections of 1872, and in 1876 he was elected deputy in the district of Puerto Rico. In 1878 he was appointed Senator and became Vice President of the Senate.

Colón was Minister of Public Works during the regency of Maria Cristina of Austria and Minister of the Navy during the same period and during the reign of Alfonso XIII. In 1892 he received the Golden Fleece to celebrate the fourth centenary of the discovery of America. In 1897 de La Cerda was elected a member of the American Antiquarian Society.

In March 1900 he was in charge of a special mission sent to Berlin to invest the German Crown Prince Wilhelm with the Order of the Golden Fleece on behalf of King Alfonso XIII.

=== Marriage and children ===
In 1867, he married Isabel de Aguilera Santiago-Perales, daughter of the Marquises of Benalúa.
The couple had three children:

- Genaro Colón y Aguilera (1873), died very young
- María del Pilar Colón y Aguilera (1875–1931), 15th Duchess of La Vega
- Cristóbal Colón y Aguilera (1878–1936), 15th Duke of Veragua, died assassinated at the start of the Spanish Civil War. No issue.
