= Álvaro de Figueroa =

Spanish polo player

Personal information
- Nationality: Spanish
- Born: 24 December 1893 Madrid, Spain
- Died: 3 November 1959 (aged 65) Madrid, Spain

Sport
- Sport: Polo
Medal record
Men's polo
Representing Spain
Summer Olympics
Silver medal – second place	1920 Antwerp

Álvaro de Figueroa y Alonso-Martínez, 2nd Marquess of Villabrágima (24 December 1893 – 3 November 1959) was a Spanish polo player. He competed at the 1920 Summer Olympics and the 1924 Summer Olympics, winning a silver medal in 1920.
