= Eduardo Dato =

Spanish politician (1856–1921)

The Most Excellent Eduardo Dato
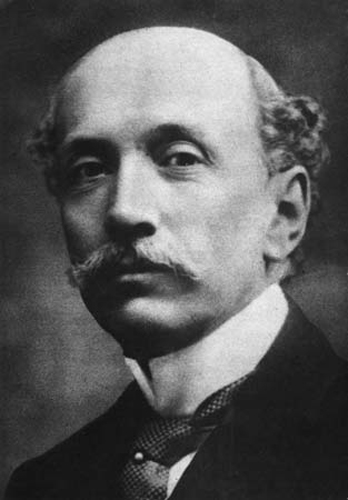
- Photograph by Kaulak

Prime Minister of Spain
- In office 28 April 1920 – 8 March 1921
- Monarch: Alfonso XIII
- Preceded by: Manuel Allendesalazar
- Succeeded by: Gabino Bugallal (Acting)
- In office 11 June – 3 November 1917
- Monarch: Alfonso XIII
- Preceded by: Manuel García Prieto
- Succeeded by: Manuel García Prieto
- In office 27 October 1913 – 9 December 1915
- Monarch: Alfonso XIII
- Preceded by: Count of Romanones
- Succeeded by: Count of Romanones

President of the Congress of Deputies
- In office 14 May 1907 – 14 April 1910
- Monarch: Alfonso XIII
- Preceded by: José Canalejas
- Succeeded by: Count of Romanones

Mayor of Madrid
- In office 28 January – 5 May 1907
- Preceded by: Alberto Aguilera
- Succeeded by: Joaquín Sánchez de Toca

Minister of Governance of Spain
- In office 4 March 1899 – 23 October 1900
- Monarch: Alfonso XIII
- Prime Minister: Francisco Silvela
- Preceded by: Trinitario Ruiz Capdepón
- Succeeded by: Francisco Javier Ugarte Pagés

Minister of Grace and Justice of Spain
- In office 6 December 1902 – 20 July 1903
- Monarch: Alfonso XIII
- Prime Minister: Francisco Silvela
- Preceded by: Joaquín López Puigcerver
- Succeeded by: Francisco Guzmán y Carballeda
- In office 7 September 1914 – 4 January 1915
- Monarch: Alfonso XIII
- Prime Minister: Himself
- Preceded by: Francisco Javier González de Castejón y Elío
- Succeeded by: Manuel de Burgos y Mazo

Minister of State of Spain
- In office 22 March – 9 November 1918
- Monarch: Alfonso XIII
- Prime Minister: Antonio Maura
- Preceded by: Manuel García Prieto
- Succeeded by: Count of Romanones

Minister of the Navy of Spain
- In office 5 May 1920 – 8 March 1921
- Monarch: Alfonso XIII
- Prime Minister: Himself
- Preceded by: Manuel Allendesalazar
- Succeeded by: Luis Marichalar y Monreal

Under Secretary of the Governance
- In office 26 June – 3 December 1892
- Monarch: Alfonso XIII
- Regent: Maria Christina of Austria
- Prime Minister: Antonio Cánovas del Castillo
- Minister of Governance: Raimundo Fernández Villaverde; Manuel Danvila Collado
- Preceded by: Joaquín Sánchez de Toca
- Succeeded by: Francisco Fernández de Henestrosa y Boza

Personal details
- Born: 12 August 1856 A Coruña, Spain
- Died: 8 March 1921 (aged 64) Madrid, Spain
- Resting place: Pantheon of Illustrious Men
- Party: Conservative
- Spouse(s): María de Barrenechea, 1st Duchess of Dato
- Children: 3

Eduardo Dato e Iradier (12 August 1856 – 8 March 1921) was a Spanish political leader during the Spanish Restoration period. He served three times as Spanish prime minister: from 27 October 1913 to 9 December 1915, from 11 June 1917 to 3 November 1917, and from 28 April 1920 until his assassination by Catalan anarchists. He also held eleven cabinet ministries, and was four times president of the Spanish Congress of Deputies.

== Career ==
Born in A Coruña, Spain, son of Carlos Dato y Granados (himself the son of Carlos Dato Camacho y Marín and wife Cayetana Ruperta Granados y García, de Vivancos e Acosta) and wife Rosa Lorenza Iradier e Arce, of Galician descent. He graduated in Law at the Complutense University in 1875. He opened his law office two years later. Elected to the Spanish parliament in 1883, he became Under-secretary for the Ministry of the Interior in 1892.

He held the position of Minister of the Interior and Minister of Justice over the next fifteen years. In 1907, he ran for and won the position of Mayor of Madrid. In 1910, he entered the Academy of Moral and Political Sciences. In 1913 he became prime minister for the first time. In 1915, he left that position, but would return to it for a short while in 1917. He became the 230th Minister for Foreign Affairs from 22 March 1918 to 9 November 1918. Then he moved to the post of Minister of State and stayed there until 1920, when he led the government as prime minister again.

Dato was a member of the International Permanent Court in The Hague (he became vice-president in 1913), member of the International Law Institute, administrator of the bank firm 'Banco Hipotecario' and president of the National Institute of Social Security, the Council of Public Instruction and the Academy of Jurisprudence and Legislation.

== Assassination ==
On 8 March 1921 in Madrid, while being driven from the parliament building and in front of the Puerta de Alcalá, Dato was assassinated by three Catalan anarchists, Luis Nicolau, Pedro Mateu, and Ramón Casanellas, who were riding a motorcycle. This was the second murder of a Spanish prime minister in less than a decade; in 1912 José Canalejas had been killed similarly. His assassination came amid rising unrest between trade unions, particularly the Confederación Nacional del Trabajo, and the government.

King Alfonso XIII of Spain posthumously made him a duke by bestowing the title "Duchess of Dato" on his widow.

== Honours ==
Dato was conferred with the following honours:

- Chain of the Order of Charles III
- Knight Grand Cross of the First Class of the Order of St. Gregory the Great of the Holy See
- Grand Cross of the Order of Christ of Portugal.
- 340th Grand Cross of the Order of the Tower and Sword of Portugal.
- After he died, his wife was granted the title of Duchess of Dato in his honor.

== Marriage and children ==
He married María del Carmen de Barrenechea y Montegui, Dame of the Order of Noble Dames of Queen Maria Luisa of Spain and Grand Cross of the Order of Beneficence of Spain, of Basque descent (- Madrid, 1926), daughter of Juan José de Barrenechea e Urdampilleta (himself the son of Pedro de Barrenechea y Zubea and wife María Ignacia de Urdampilleta y Lagarto) and wife Micaela Montegui y Mercaide (herself the daughter of José Manuel Montegui and wife María de la Concepción Mercaide), and had three daughters:

- Isabel Dato y Barrenechea, 2nd Duchess of Dato, unmarried and without issue
- María del Carmen Dato y Barrenechea, 3rd Duchess of Dato (Madrid, 6 December 1885 – 1954), married to Eugenio Espinosa de los Monteros, and had issue, two sons
- María de la Concepción Dato y Barrenechea (Madrid, 2 May 1890 – Madrid, 16 September 1973), married in Paris, 25 April 1922 to Ernesto de Zulueta e Isasi, of the Marquesses of Álava Viscounts of Casa Blanca (Bilbao, 26 April 1892 – Madrid, 9 September 1969), a Spanish Diplomat, and had issue
