= Manuel González-Hontoria y Fernández-Ladreda =

Spanish politician and diplomat

Manueol González-Hontoria

Manuel González-Hontoria y Fernández-Ladreda (31 January 1878 – 26 October 1954) was a Spanish politician and diplomat who served two times as Minister of State during the reign of Alfonso XIII. He was also the son of the artillery inventor/engineer and military man José González Hontoria.

Hontoria was one of the architects of the Algeciras Conference of 1906 to mediate the First Moroccan Crisis between France and Germany.

He is the author of Tratado de Derecho Internacional y de El protectorado francés en Marruecos and co-author of Historia Universal de Oncken.
