= Joaquín Sánchez de Toca =

Spanish politician (1852–1942)

The Most Excellent Joaquín Sánchez de Toca
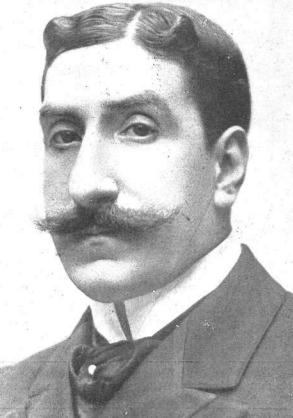

Prime Minister of Spain
- In office 20 July 1919 – 12 December 1919
- Monarch: Alfonso XIII
- Preceded by: Antonio Maura
- Succeeded by: Manuel Allendesalazar
Other offices held
President of the Senate of Spain
In office 25 June 1915 – 16 March 1916
Monarch	Alfonso XIII
Preceded by	Marcelo Azcárraga Palmero
Succeeded by	Manuel García Prieto
In office 15 December 1919 – 6 April 1923
Monarch	Alfonso XIII
Preceded by	Manuel Allendesalazar
Succeeded by	Count of Romanones
Mayor of Madrid
In office 2 December 1896 – 4 October 1897
Preceded by	Eduardo de Rojas Alonso
Succeeded by	Count of Romanones
In office 7 May – 28 October 1907
Preceded by	Eduardo Dato
Succeeded by	Count of Peñalver
Minister of Agriculture, Industry, Commerce and Fine Arts of Spain
In office 23 October 1900 – 6 March 1901
Monarch	Alfonso XIII
Regent	Maria Christina of Austria
Prime Minister	Marcelo Azcárraga Palmero
Preceded by	Rafael Gasset
Succeeded by	Miguel Villanueva y Gómez
Minister of Grace and Justice of Spain
In office 5 December 1904 – 16 December 1904
Monarch	Alfonso XIII
Prime Minister	Antonio Maura
Preceded by	Francisco Guzmán y Carballeda
Succeeded by	Francisco Javier Ugarte Pagés
Minister of the Navy of Spain
In office 6 December 1902 – 20 July 1903
Monarch	Alfonso XIII
Prime Minister	Francisco Silvela
Preceded by	Duke of Veragua
Succeeded by	Eduardo Cobían y Roffignac

Personal details
- Born: Joaquín Sánchez de Toca y Calvo; 24 September 1852 Madrid, Spain
- Died: 13 July 1942 (aged 89) Pozuelo de Alarcón, Spain

Joaquín Sánchez de Toca y Calvo (24 September 1852 – 13 July 1942) was a Spanish conservative politician who served as Prime Minister in 1919.

== Biography ==
Born in Madrid on 24 September 1852, he became Mayor of Madrid in 1896, and held the office until 1897.

He served as Minister of Agriculture, Industry and Commerce from 23 October 1900 to 6 March 1901 during the Regency of Maria Christina of Austria. Already in the majority of Alfonso XIII of Spain, he served as Minister of the Navy (6 December 1902 – 20 July 1903) and as Minister of Justice (5 December 1903 – 16 December 1904) in the conservative governments of Francisco Silvela and Antonio Maura, respectively. He made a comeback as Mayor of Madrid in 1907.

In the later years of the constitutional period of the Alphonsine monarchy he was named Prime Minister replacing Antonio Maura. He led the cabinet from 20 July 1919 to 12 December 1919. He died on 13 July 1942 in Pozuelo de Alarcón.
