= Joaquín Fernández Prida =

Spanish lawyer and politician

Joaquín Fernández Prida

Joaquín Fernández Prida (March 31, 1863 in Oviedo, Spain – October 29, 1942 in Madrid, Spain) was a Spanish lawyer and politician who served as Minister of State in 1922, during the reign of King Alfonso XIII of Spain.

== Sources ==
Personal dossier of D. Joaquín Fernández Prida. Spanish Senate
