= José Álvarez de Toledo y Acuña =

Spanish politician and diplomat

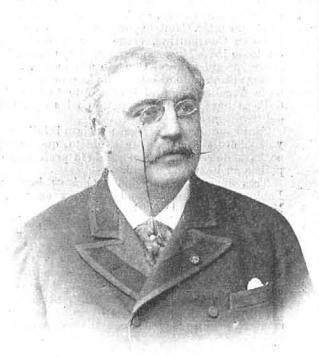
José Álvarez de Toledo y Acuña

José Álvarez de Toledo y Acuña, 2nd Duke of Bivona (August 6, 1838 – August 31, 1898) was a senior Spanish politician and diplomat.

== Career ==
In June 1864, Queen Isabella II granted then 26-year-old Álvarez the title Count of Xiquena, a county in present day Murcia. He used this to jump start his political career, being elected that same year to the Congress of Deputies, the lower house of the Cortes Generales, for the comarca of Torrecilla en Cameros, province of Logroño. He was re-elected as a Deputy, for the comarca of Logroño, province of Logroño, in 1865, 1867 and 1876.

In 1879, just five years into the restored monarchy under Alfonso XII, Álvarez was elected to the upper house, the Senate of Spain, as the Senator for the Canary Islands.

In 1881, he returned to the Congress as the Deputy for the district of Aguadilla, Puerto Rico (still part of the Spanish Empire). In 1886, he was elected as Deputy for the municipality of Toledo, province of Toledo.

In 1885, he inherited the Dukdom of Bivona from his father.

In December 1888, Prime Minister Práxedes Mateo Sagasta brought Álvarez onto the Council of State, during the regency (for her child, Alfonso XIII) of Maria Christina of Austria. Álvarez served as the Minister of Public Works and the Economy until January 1890.

In 1891, Álvarez returned to the Senate, representing Jaén, and in 1893 became the Senator for Santa Clara, Cuba.

Álvarez left his Senate seat in 1894, when he was appointed President of the Council of State. In October 1897, Prime Minister Sagasta assigned Álvarez the added responsibility of Minister of Public Works and the Economy, which he held until May 1898.

Álvarez was also a civil governor of the province of Madrid.
