= Amós Salvador Rodrigáñez =

Spanish engineer and politician (1845–1922)

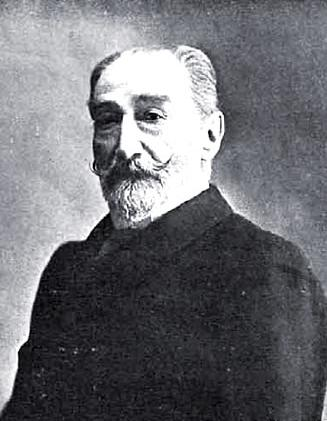
Amós Salvador Rodrigáñez

Amós Salvador Rodrigáñez was a Spanish politician and engineer. Born on March 31, 1845, in Logroño, Spain, Rodrigáñez made a lasting impact on the country's political landscape. His career included serving as the Minister for Finance and Public Function of Spain. Throughout his life, he held various ministerial positions, such as Minister of Transport and Sustainable Mobility of Spain, Minister of Education and Science of Spain.

Apart from his political endeavors, Rodrigáñez was also recognized for his significant contributions as an engineer. His work in the field left a mark on Spain's infrastructure and development. He played a crucial role in advancing engineering practices during his time.

Rodrigáñez had three children named Amós Salvador Sáenz y Carreras, Miguel Salvador y Carreras, and Fernando Salvador Carreras.
