= Antonio Maura =

Spanish politician (1853–1925)

The Most Excellent Antonio Maura
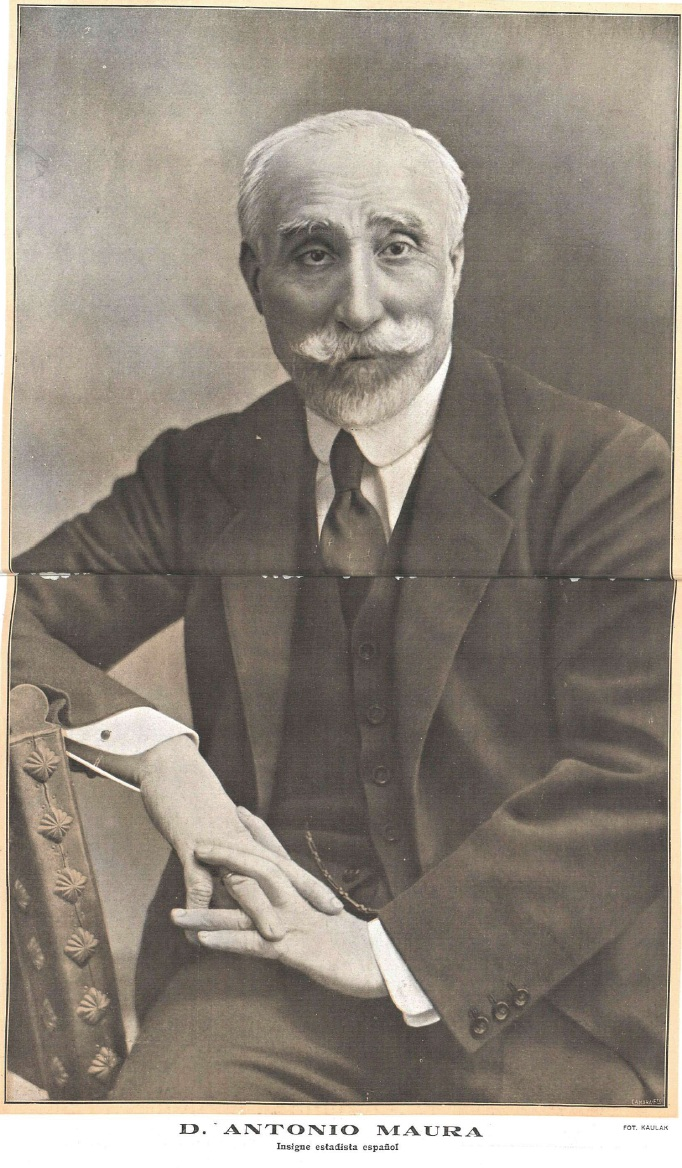
- Photograph by Kaulak

Prime Minister of Spain
- In office 14 August 1921 – 8 March 1922
- Monarch: Alfonso XIII
- Preceded by: Manuel Allendesalazar
- Succeeded by: José Sánchez-Guerra
- In office 14 April 1919 – 20 July 1919
- Monarch: Alfonso XIII
- Preceded by: Count of Romanones
- Succeeded by: Joaquín Sánchez de Toca
- In office 22 March 1918 – 9 November 1918
- Monarch: Alfonso XIII
- Preceded by: Manuel García Prieto
- Succeeded by: Manuel García Prieto
- In office 25 January 1907 – 21 October 1909
- Monarch: Alfonso XIII
- Preceded by: Antonio González de Aguilar
- Succeeded by: Segismundo Moret
- In office 5 December 1903 – 16 December 1904
- Monarch: Alfonso XIII
- Preceded by: Raimundo Fernández
- Succeeded by: Marcelo Azcárraga

Minister of Governance of Spain
- In office 6 December 1902 – 20 July 1903
- Monarch: Alfonso XIII
- Prime Minister: Francisco Silvela
- Preceded by: Segismundo Moret
- Succeeded by: Antonio García Alix

Minister of Grace and Justice of Spain
- In office 4 November 1894 – 23 March 1895
- Monarch: Alfonso XIII
- Prime Minister: Práxedes Mateo Sagasta
- Preceded by: Trinitario Ruiz Capdepón
- Succeeded by: Francisco Romero Robledo

Minister of Overseas of Spain
- In office 11 December 1892 – 12 March 1894
- Monarch: Alfonso XIII
- Prime Minister: Práxedes Mateo Sagasta
- Preceded by: Francisco Romero Robledo
- Succeeded by: Manuel Becerra Bermúdez

Seat U of the Royal Spanish Academy
- In office 29 November 1903 – 13 December 1925
- Preceded by: Isidoro Fernández Flórez
- Succeeded by: Leopoldo Eijo y Garay

Director of the Royal Spanish Academy
- In office 30 October 1913 – 13 December 1925
- Preceded by: Alejandro Pidal y Mon
- Succeeded by: Ramón Menéndez Pidal

Personal details
- Born: Antonio Maura Montaner; 2 May 1853 Palma, Spain
- Died: 13 December 1925 (aged 72) Torrelodones, Spain
- Spouse: Constancia Gamazo y Calvo (m. 1878)
- Children: 10, including Gabriel and Miguel
- Relatives: Germán Gamazo (brother-in-law)

Antonio Maura Montaner (2 May 1853 – 13 December 1925) was Prime Minister of Spain on five occasions.

== Early life ==
Maura was born in Palma, on the island of Mallorca, he was the seventh child in a family of ten siblings, His parents were Bartolomé, owner of a tannery, and Margarita, who devoted herself entirely to the care of her family.

He moved to study law in Madrid. There, he met the brothers Trifino and Honorio Gamazo Calvo. This connection provided him an opportunity to intern at the law firm of Mr. Germán Gamazo, setting the stage for his future career in law and politics.

In 1878, Maura married Constancia Gamazo y Calvo, the sister of Germán Gamazo. They had several sons and a daughter together, many of whom have been prominent in Spanish politics.

== Early political career ==
He was elected a member of the Congress of Deputies for Palma de Mallorca in 1881, which he would represent until 1923 in successive legislatures.

His political career was marked by rapid advancements, including an initial appointment as a Vice-president of the Royal Academy of Jurisprudence and Legislation from 1882 to 1884, and later as Vice President of the Congress of Deputies in 1886.

His political influence expanded significantly when he rejected a ministerial position in a Sagastino cabinet in 1888, only to accept the role of Minister of Overseas Territories under President Práxedes Mateo Sagasta from December 1892 to March 1894.

He went served as Minister of Grace and Justice from November 1894 to March 1895 under the same administration. During this period, he was elected served times as President of the Royal Academy of Jurisprudence and Legislation.

Although he had started his political career as a liberal, after the death of his brother-in-law Germán Gamazo in 1901, he assumed leadership of Gamazo's group, which would merge with the Conservative Party

He was appointed by President Francisco Silvela as Minister of the Interior from December 1902 to July 1903.

In 1903, he was elected as an academician of the Royal Spanish Academy (R.A.E.), the official regulator of the Spanish language, with the seat "U".

== Premier on five occasions ==
He first assumed the presidency of the Council of Ministers in December 1903. That premiership would be shortlived, and he would resign exactly one year later, in December 1904, in which Barcelona experienced its first terrorist attack.

He was President again between January 1907 and October 1909, in a period of rare stability that earned the nickname "Long Government". He fell from power after his suppression of an uprising in Barcelona in 1909, called the Tragic Week.

After 1913, during the Restoration's regime crisis, Maura's figure nurtured a conservative political movement, Maurism (Maurismo), that was born in a schism within the ranks of the Conservative Party. It is categorised as a precursor of the Spanish radical right.

Maura later headed coalition cabinets with other parties but his time in power was limited. He was President between March and November 1918, again in 1919, and between August 1921 and March 1922, following the Disaster of Annual.

Disillusioned by the advent of Miguel Primo de Rivera's regime in 1923, he retired from politics. During Primo de Rivera's dictatorship, he remained aloof from both Primo de Rivera and the King.

== Later years and retirement ==
Aside from his political work, he served in major roles in Spanish learned societies, including as director of Royal Spanish Academy from 1913 to 1925, and as president of the Royal Academy of Jurisprudence and Legislation from 1916 to 1918.

He was also elected to the Royal Academy of Moral and Political Sciences, and the Fine Arts of San Fernando, in recognition of his gifts as a watercolorist.

In 1920 he was awarded the title of Knight of the Order of the Golden Fleece.

He died on December 13, 1925, while painting in El Canto del Pico, Torrelodones.

Five years after his death, King Alfonso XIII created his son, Gabriel, as Duke of Maura, to honor his memory.

== Descendants ==
- Gabriel Maura y Gamazo, 1st Duke of Maura (son) – historian and Minister of Labour
- Honorio Maura y Gamazo (son) – playwright and monarchist deputy, killed by leftist militia in 1936
- Miguel Maura y Gamazo (son) – Minister of the Interior
- Constancia de la Mora Maura (granddaughter) – writer, Foreign Press Officer (Spanish Republic)
- Jorge Semprún y Maura (grandson) – writer, communist and Minister of Culture
- Carlos Semprún y Maura (grandson) – writer and journalist
- Jaime Semprún (great-grandson) – writer
- Ricardo Semprún (great-grandson) – diplomat
- Pablo Semprún (great-grandson) – professional paddle tennis player
- Luisa Isabel Álvarez de Toledo (great-granddaughter)
- Jaime Chávarri y de la Mora (great-grandson) – film director.

== See also ==
- Monument to Antonio Maura
- Bolshevik triennium
