= Alejandro Groizard y Gómez de la Serna =

Spanish noble and politician

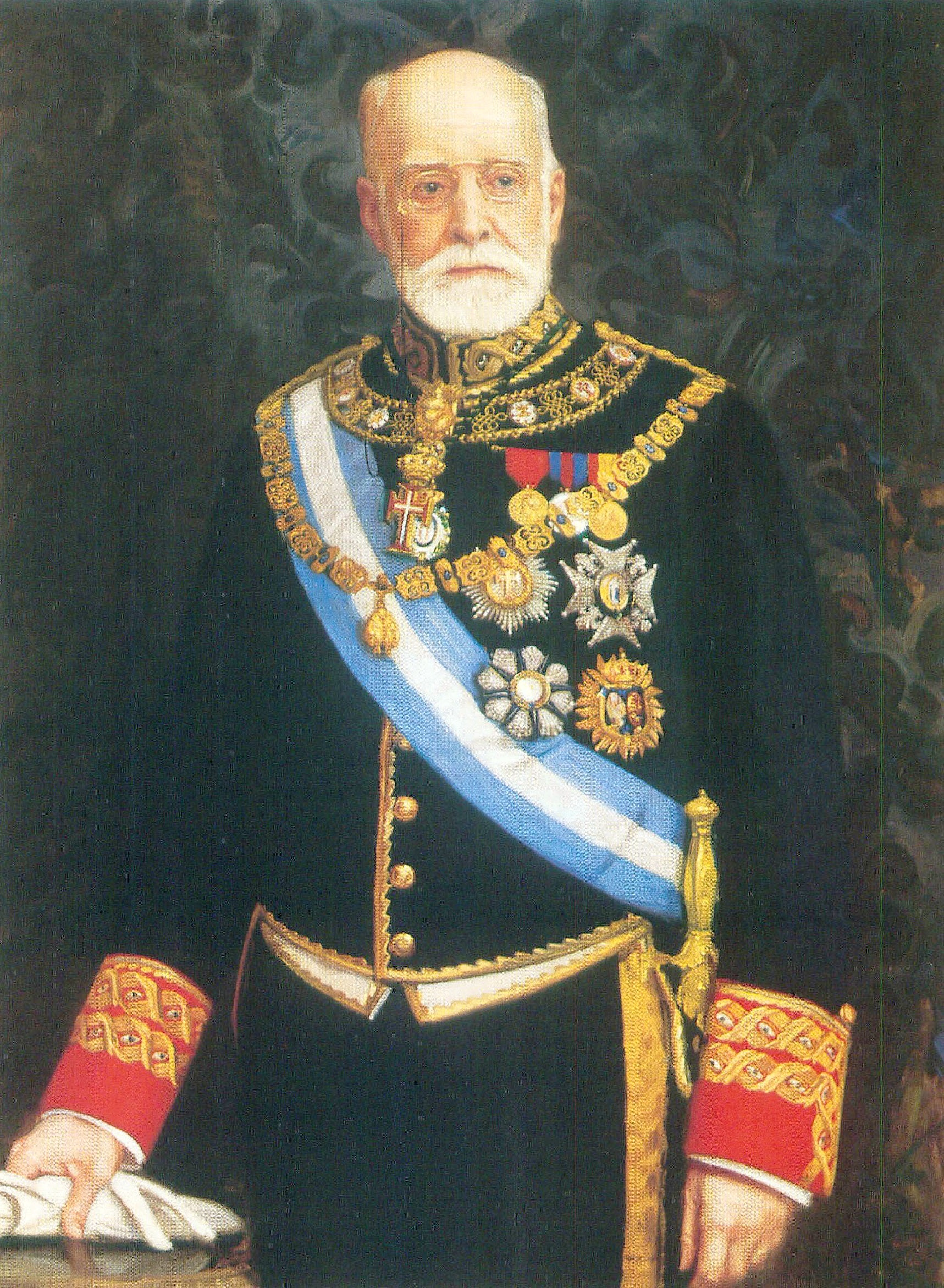
Alejandro Groizard

Don Alejandro Groizard y Gómez de la Serna (18 June 1830 – 5 September 1919) was a Spanish noble and politician who served as Minister of State between 1894 and 1895.

Political offices
Preceded by Segismundo Moret	Minister of State; 4 November 1894 – 23 March 1895	Succeeded by The Duke of Tetuan
