= Raimundo Fernández-Villaverde =

Spanish politician (1848–1905)

The Most Excellent Raimundo Fernández-Villaverde
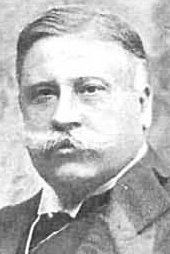

Prime Minister of Spain
- In office 27 January 1905 – 23 June 1905
- Monarch: Alfonso XIII
- Preceded by: Marcelo Azcárraga
- Succeeded by: Eugenio Montero Ríos
- In office 20 July 1903 – 5 Dec 1903
- Monarch: Alfonso XIII
- Preceded by: Francisco Silvela
- Succeeded by: Antonio Maura

Seat g of the Real Academia Española
- In office 23 November 1902 – 15 July 1905
- Preceded by: Vicente Barrantes Moreno
- Succeeded by: Francisco Rodríguez Marín

Personal details
- Born: Raimundo Fernández-Villaverde y García del Rivero; 20 January 1848 Madrid, Spain
- Died: 15 July 1905 (aged 57) Madrid, Spain

Don Raimundo Fernández-Villaverde y García del Rivero, iure uxoris Marquess of Pozo Rubio, (20 January 1848 – 15 July 1905) was a Spanish statesman.

Born in Madrid, Raimundo Fernandez Villaverde graduated at age 21 from the Central University of Madrid in Law Studies. He later became Professor of this university after receiving the degree of Doctor of Philosophy.

He joined the Conservative Party and was elected to the Spanish Parliament in 1872 as representative for Caldas.

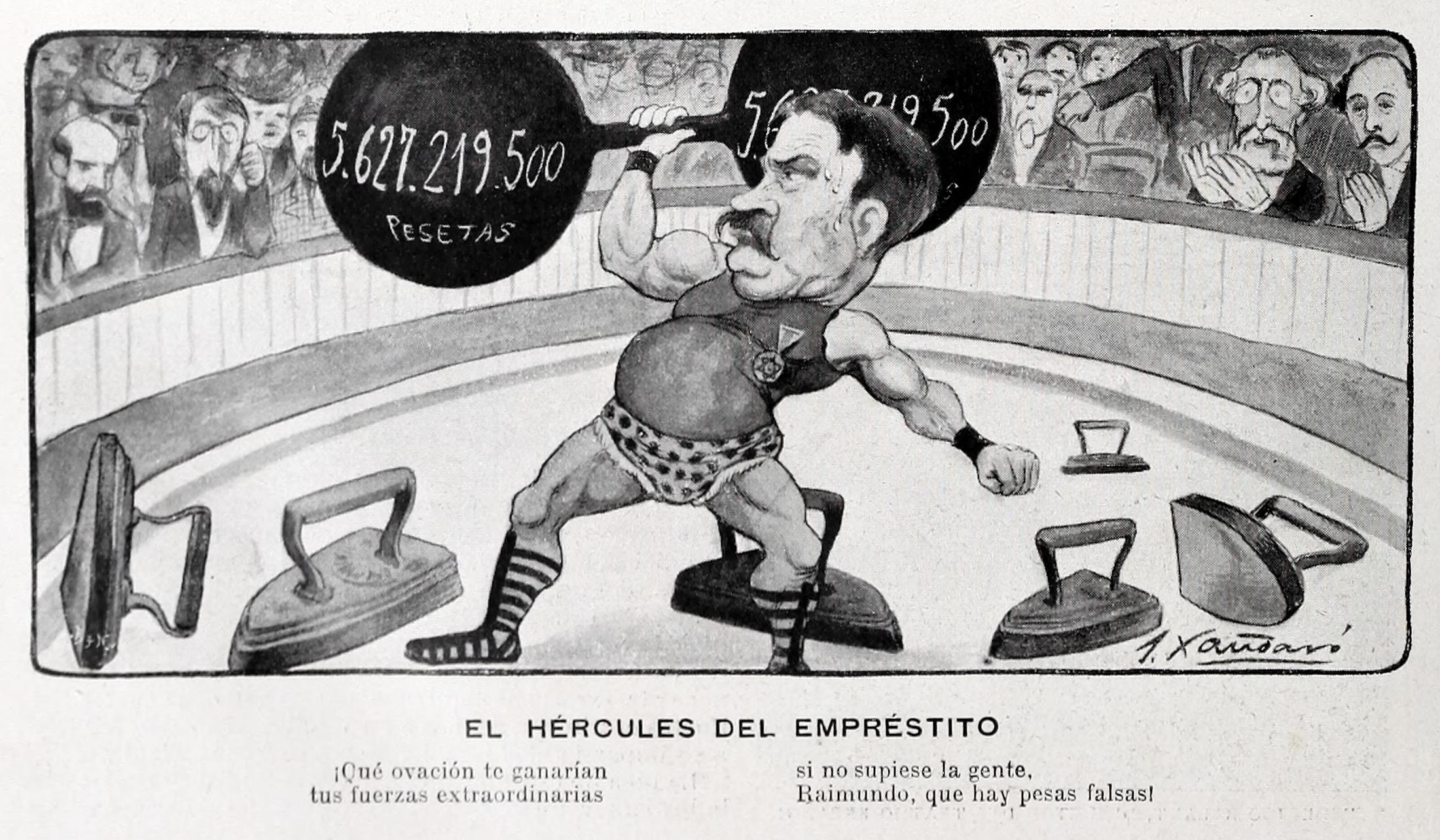
Depicted in a 1900 cartoon, by Joaquín Xaudaró.

On 31 March 1884, he was appointed civil governor of Madrid.

From 1880 to his death, he held various government ministries including Finance, Justice and Interior, became President of Parliament, and was twice Prime Minister.

He is credited with the economic reforms passed in 1899 and 1900 that stabilised the nation's economy after the loss of the last Spanish colonies in the Americas and the Pacific Ocean.

== Bibliography ==
- Francisco Comín, Pablo Martín Aceña y Miguel Martorell (2000): La Hacienda española y sus ministros. Del 98 a la Guerra Civil, Prensas Universitarias de Zaragoza, 2000, ISBN 84-95901-69-2
- Miguel Martorell Linares: “Villaverde ante el Parlamento”, Hacienda Pública Española, número monográfico, 1999, pp. 73–93.
