= Miguel Villanueva y Gómez =

Spanish politician and lawyer

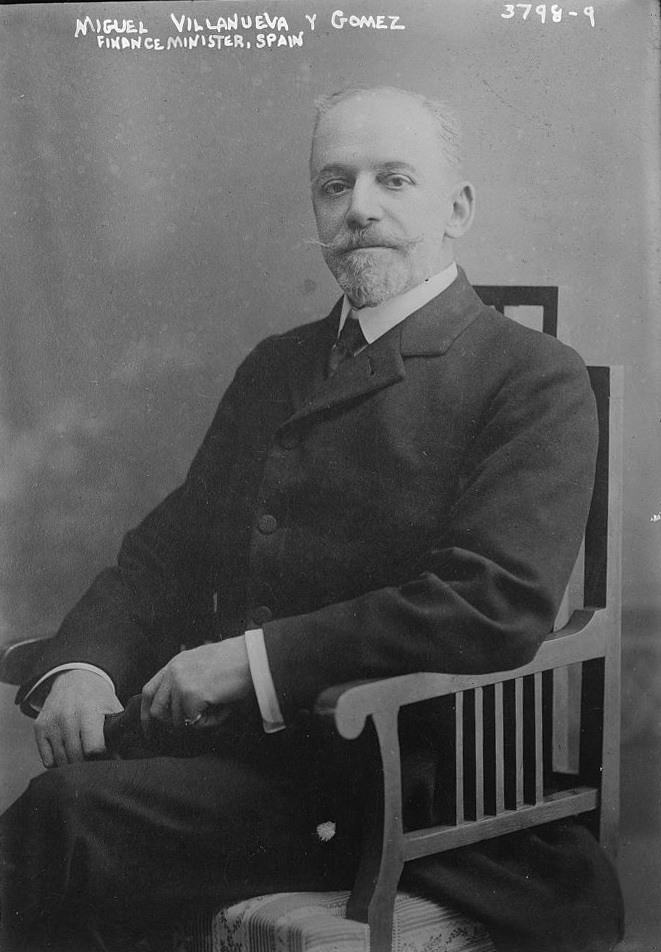
Miguel Villanueva y Gómez in 1915

Miguel Villanueva y Gómez (31 October 1852, in Madrid, Spain – 13 September 1931, in Madrid) was a Spanish politician and lawyer who served as Minister of State from 1915 to 1916, during the reign of King Alfonso XIII of Spain.

== Sources ==
- Personal dossier of D. Miguel Villanueva. Spanish Senate
