= Loring (surname) =

Loring is a surname and may refer to:

- Charles Loring (judge) (1873–1961), American lawyer, judge and Chief Justice of the Minnesota Supreme Court
- Charles Greely Loring (architect) (1881–1966), American architect based in Boston, son of the Civil War general
- Charles Greely Loring (general) (1828–1902), Union Army general during the Civil War, later director of Boston's Museum of Fine Arts
- Charles Greely Loring (lawyer) (1794–1867), American lawyer and politician based in Boston, father of the Civil War general
- Charles Harding Loring (1828–1907), American mechanical engineer
- Charles J. Loring Jr. (1918–1952), United States Air Force fighter pilot posthumously awarded the Medal of Honor
- Charles M. Loring (1833–1922), American businessperson, miller, father of the Minneapolis park system
- Edward G. Loring (1802–1890), American judge who ordered that two escaped slaves be returned to their masters
- Ellis Gray Loring (1803–1858), American abolitionist lawyer
- F. G. Loring (1869–1951), English naval officer, wireless expert and writer
- Frederick Wadsworth Loring (1848–1871), American journalist, novelist and poet
- Frances Loring (1887–1968), Canadian sculptor
- George B. Loring (1817–1891), Member of US House of Representatives for Massachusetts
- George F. Loring (1851–1918), American architect
- Gloria Loring (born 1946), American singer, songwriter and actress
- Henry Loring (died 1822), Archdeacon of Calcutta
- Israel Loring (1682–1772), British American minister
- John Loring (Royal Navy officer, died 1808)
- John Loring (designer) (born 1939), American designer and author
- John Wentworth Loring (1775–1852), Royal Navy admiral
- Jorge Loring, 1st Marquis of Casa Loring (1822–1901), Spanish noble, politician and businessman, founder of the aircraft manufacturer Talleres Loring
- Jorge Loring Martinez (1889–1936), Spanish aviation entrepreneur, grandson of the 1st Marquis of Casa Loring
- Jorge Loring Miró (1921–2013), Spanish Jesuit priest and author, son of Jorge Loring Martinez
- Joshua Loring (1716–1781), American commodore in British service and United Empire Loyalist
- Lisa Loring (1958–2023), American actress
- Nigel Loring (surgeon) (1896–1979), Apothecary to the British Royal Household
- Rosamond B. Loring (1889–1950), author, bookbinder and creator, collector and historian of decorated papers
- Teala Loring (1924–2008), American actress
- Thomas Loring (died 1661), early colonial settler, ancestor of most Lorings in eastern Massachusetts and probably New England
- William Loring (Royal Navy officer) (1811–1895), British admiral
- William Wing Loring (1818–1886), American officer in the United States Army, Confederate States Army and Egyptian Army

== See also ==
- List of Marqueses de Casa Loring, which includes several nobles with the surname Loring
