= Ignacio Figueroa y Mendieta =

Spanish businessman and politician

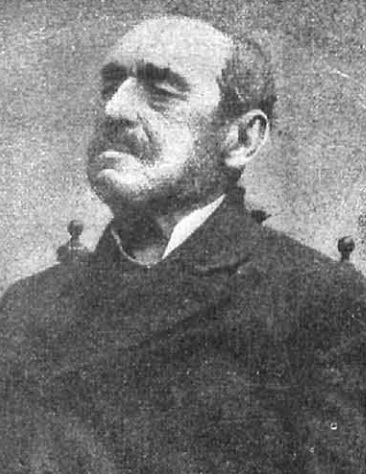

Member of the Senate of Spain for the Province of Guadalajara
- In office 1877–1899
- In office 1867–1868

Member of the Congress of Deputies for Guadalajara
- In office 1876–1877
- In office 1865–1867
- Preceded by: Manuel García Barzanallana

Personal details
- Born: Joaquín Ignacio Figueroa y Mendieta; 22 April 1808 Llerena, Badajoz
- Died: 11 March 1899 (aged 90)
- Spouse(s): Ana de Torres, Viscountess of Irueste (m. 1852; died 1899)
- Children: Francisca, José, Álvaro, Gonzalo, Rodrigo
- Parent(s): Luis Figueroa y Casaus; Luisa Mendieta

Joaquín Ignacio Figueroa y Mendieta (22 April 1808 – 11 March 1899) was a Spanish politician and businessman.

== Early life ==
Ignacio was born in Llerena on 22 April 1808. He was the only son of Luis Figueroa y Casaus (an afrancesado who moved to Marseille after May 1808 and made a considerable fortune investing in mining companies dedicated to lead extraction in Andalusia) and Luisa Mendieta.

He received an education in Paris, and, after working for a time as the representative of the interests of his father in Spain, he settled in Madrid in 1845.

== Career ==
Following his father's death, Ignacio inherit the family's vast fortune and companies.

He earned a seat at the Congress of Deputies for the first time in 1865, replacing the vacant seat left by Manuel García Barzanallana in the district of Guadalajara. He renewed his seat during the reign of Isabella II in 1865, and 1867. He became senator for the first time in the 1867–1868 period. Durante the reign of Amadeo I, Figueroa was elected as deputy in representation of Puentedeume at the 1872 election.

Following the Bourbon Restoration, he was elected member of the Congress in the first election that took place in the new regime in 1876, in representation of Guadalajara; appointed as Senator he renounced to his deputy seat in 1877. He served at the Senate until 1899.

== Personal life ==
In 1852, he married Ana de Torres, Viscountess of Irueste (1832–1905), a daughter of José Silvestre de Torres y Tovar, 5th Marquess of Villamejor and Inés de Romo y Bedoya. The marriage formed a union between an affluent bourgeois—him—and an aristocrat in economic hardship, so he got to enter aristocratic circles. Together, they spawned one of the most influential families in Spain during the Restoration period. There children included:

- Francisca de Paula Figueroa y Torres (1855–1927), who married Pedro Díez de Rivera y Muro, 5th Count of Almodóvar.
- José Figueroa y Torres (1857–1901), who succeeded his mother as the Viscount of Irueste; he married María Rosario Loring y Heredia, the third daughter of Jorge Loring, 1st Marquis of Casa Loring and Amalia Heredia Livermore, in 1883.
- Álvaro de Figueroa y Torres (1863–1950), the Prime Minister of Spain who became the 1st Count of Romanones; he married Casilda Alonso Martínez, the daughter of Manuel Alonso Martínez, the Minister of Grace and Justice, in 1888.
- Gonzalo Figueroa y Torres (1861–1921), the Mayor of Madrid who became the 1st Duke of Las Torres; he married María Manuela O'Neill y Salamanca in 1892.
- Rodrigo Figueroa y Torres (1866–1929), who was created the 1st Duke of Tovar; he married Amelia de Bermejillo y Martínez-Negrete, a lady in waiting of Queen Victoria Eugenie of Battenberg, in 1891.

He died in Madrid on 11 March 1899.
