= List of mayors of Madrid =

Mayor of Madrid
- Coat of arms of Madrid

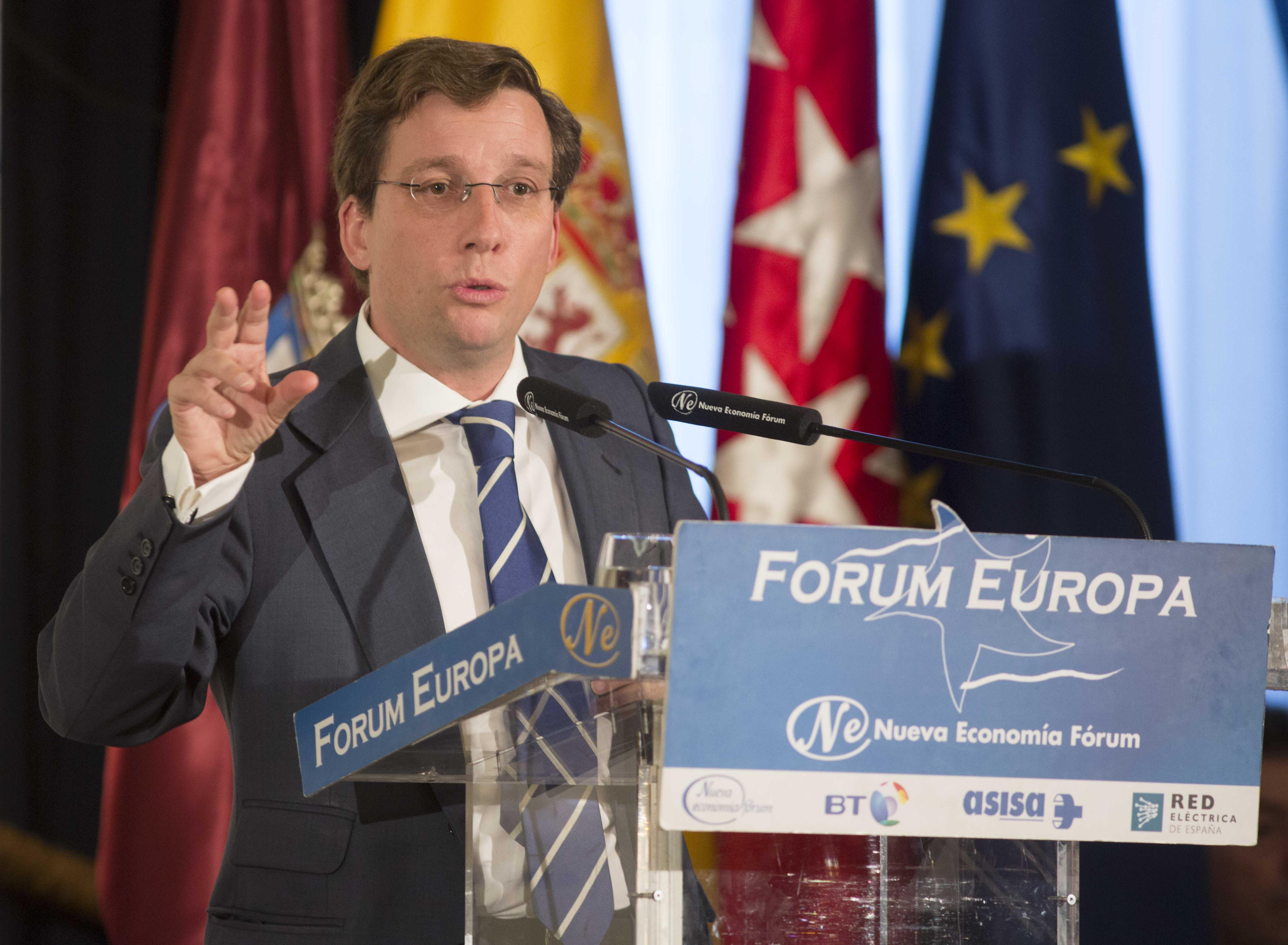
- Incumbent; José Luis Martínez-Almeida since June 15, 2019
- Seat: Cybele Palace
- Inaugural holder: Juan de Araso
- Formation: 1458
- Website: Official site

The following is a list of mayors (alcaldes) of Madrid since 1803.

Under the Ancien Régime, the city was headed by a corregidor until the 19th century. Currently, the city's local government is under the jurisdiction of the City Council of Madrid.

== Mayors from 1803 to 1931 ==
- José Urbina, 1803–1805
- José de Marquina Galindo, 1805–1808
- Pedro de Mora y Lomas, 1808–1810
- Dámaso de la Torre, 1810–1811
- Manuel García de la Prada, 1811–1812
- Juan Antonio Pico, 1812
- Marqués de Iturvieta, 1812 and 1813
- Conde de Villapaterna, 1812
- Pedro Sainz de Baranda y Gorriti, 1812, 1813 and 1820
- Magín Ferrer, 1812
- Frutos Álvarez Benito, 1812
- Conde de Moctezuma, 1814
- Juan de Mata Garro Robles, marqués de las Hormazas 1814–1816
- José Manuel de Arjona, 1816–1820
- Rodrigo de Aranda, 1820–1822
- Félix Ovalle, 1820
- José Pío de Molina, 1820–1821, 1823
- Conde de Clavijo, 1821
- Conde de Goyeneche, 1821–1822
- Marqués de Santa Cruz, 1822
- Ramón Casella, 1822
- Cayetano Rubio, 1822
- Miguel Nájera, 1822
- Arias Gonzalo de Mendoza, 1822–1823
- Luis Beltrán de Leo, 1823
- Joaquín Lorenzo Mozo, 1824
- León de la Cámara Cano, 1824–1828
- Tadeo Ignacio Gil, 1828–1830
- Domingo María de Barrafón, 1830–1834
- Marqués de Falces, 1834–1835
- José María Galdeano, 1835
- Marqués de Pontejos, 1835–1836
- Juan Losaña, 1836
- José María Basualdo, 1837
- Juan Bautista del Llano, 1837
- Victor López Molina, 1838
- Manuel Ruiz Oganio, 1838
- Tomás Fernández Vallejo, 1839
- Luis Oseñalde, 1839
- Salustiano Olózaga, 1840
- Joaquín María Ferrer, 1840
- Francisco Javier Ferro Mateo, 1840
- Marqués de Peñaflorida, 1842–1845
- Juan Álvarez Mendizálbal, 1843
- Ignacio de Olea, 1843–1854
- Jacinto Félix Doménech, 1843
- Manuel de Larraín, 1843–1844
- Marqués de Someruelos, 1844–1847
- Manuel de Bárbara, 1844
- Duque de Veragua, 1845–1846
- José Laplana, 1846
- Conde de Vistahermosa, 1847
- Marqués de Santa Cruz, 1848–1851
- Luis Piernas, 1851–1852
- Conde de Quinto, 1852, 1853–1854
- José Seco Baldor, 1854
- Valentín Ferraz, 1855–1856
- Jacobo Fitz-James Stuart, 15th Duke of Alba, 1857
- Carlos Marfori y Callejas, 1857
- José Osorio y Silva, Duque de Sesto 1857–1864
- Duque de Tamames, 1864
- Conde de Puñonrostro, 1864
- Conde de Belascoáin, 1864–1865
- José Ramón Osorio, 1865
- Marqués de San Saturnino, 1865–1866
- Marqués de Villaseca, 1866–1867
- Marqués de Villamagna, 1867
- Marqués Viudo de Villar, 1867–1868
- Nicolás María Rivero, 1868–1870
- Manuel María José de Galdo, 1870
- Fernando Hidalgo Saavedra, 1870–1872
- Marqués de Sardoal, 1872–1874
- Carlos María Ponte, 1872
- Simeón Avalos, 1872–1873
- Pedro Menéndez Vega, 1873
- Pedro Bernardo Uncasitas, 1873–1874
- Francisco de Borja Queipo de Llano y Gayoso de los Cobos, VIII Conde de Toreno, 1874–1875
- Conde de Heredia Spinola, 1875–1877
- Marqués de Torneros, 1877–1881
- José Abascal y Carredano, 1881–1883, 1885–1889
- Marqués de Urquijo, 1883
- Gonzalo de Saavedra y Cueto, 1884–1885
- Alberto Bosch y Fustegueras, 1885, 1891–1892
- Andrés Mellado, 1889–1890
- Cayetano Sánchez Bustillo, 1890
- Narciso García-Loygorri, Duque de Vistahermosa, 1890
- Faustino Rodríguez San Pedro, 1890–1891
- Marqués de Cubas, 1892
- Nicolás de Peñalver y Zamora, conde de Peñalver 1892, 1895–1896, 1907–1909
- Manuel de Mariátegui, 1st Count of San Bernardo, 1892–1893
- Santiago Angulo, 1893–1894
- Conde de Romanones, 1894–1895, 1897–1899
- Conde de Montarco, 1896
- Joaquín Sánchez de Toca, 1896–1897, 1907
- Ventura García-Sancho, Marquis of Aguilar de Campoo, 1899–1900
- Manuel Allendesalazar, 1900
- Mariano Fernández de Henestrosa Mioño, duque de Santo Mauro (1900–1901)
- Alberto Aguilera y Velasco (1901–1902)
- Vicente Cabeza de Vaca y Fernández de Córdoba, marqués de Portazgo (1902–1903)
- Salvador Bermúdez de Castro y O'Lawlor, marqués de Lema (1903– 1904)
- Gonzalo de Figueroa y Torres, conde de Mejorada del Campo y marqués de Villamejor (1904–1905)
- Eduardo Vincenti (1905–1906)
- Alberto Aguilera y Velasco (1906–1907)
- Eduardo Dato e Iradier (1907–1907)
- Joaquín Sánchez de Toca (1907–1907)
- Nicolás de Peñalver y Zamora, conde de Peñalver (1907–1909)
- Alberto Aguilera y Velasco (1909–1910)
- José Francos Rodríguez (1910–1912)
- Joaquín Ruiz Jiménez (1912–1913)
- Eduardo Vincenti (1913–1913)
- Luis Marichalar y Monreal, vizconde de Eza (1913–1914)
- Carlos Prats y Rodríguez de Llano (1914–1915)
- José del Prado y Palacios (1915–1915)
- Joaquín Ruiz Jiménez (1915–1916)
- Martín Rosales Martel, duque de Almodóvar del Valle (1916–1917)
- Luis Silvela Casado (1917–1917)
- José Francos Rodríguez (1917–1918)
- Luis Silvela Casado (1918–1918)
- Luis Garrido Juaristi (1918–1920)
- Ramón Rivero de Miranda, conde de Limpias (1920–1921)
- Alfredo Serrano Jover (1921–1921)
- Álvaro de Figueroa y Alonso Martínez, marqués de Villabrágima (1921–1922)
- José María Garay, conde del Valle Suchil (1922–1922)
- {Joaquín Ruiz Jiménez (Spanish politician)} (1922–1923)
- Faustino Nicoli (1923–1923)
- Alberto Alcocer y Ribacoba (1923–1924)
- Conde de Vallellano (1924–1925)
- José del Prado Palacio (1925–1927)
- Emilio Antón (1927–1927)
- Manuel Semprún y Pombo(1927–1927)
- Rafael Carlos Gordon Arístegui, conde de Mirasol, (1927–1927)
- José María de Aristizábal Manchón (1927–1930)
- José María de Hoyos y Vinent de la Torre O'Neill, marqués de Hoyos (1930–1931)

== Mayors since 1931 ==
Name	Portrait	Birth and death	Office started	Office ended	Party affiliation
Joaquín Ruiz Jiménez		12 September 1854; Jaén – 1934; Madrid (aged 79)	27 February 1931	13 April 1931 (45 days)	
Pedro Rico López		7 August 1888; Madrid – 1957; Aix-en-Provence (France)	15 April 1931	6 October 1934 (3 years, 174 days)	Republican Action
José Martínez de Velasco		16 June 1875; Madrid – 22 August 1936; Madrid (aged 61)	8 October 1934	19 October 1934 (11 days)	Agrarian Party
Rafael Salazar Alonso		27 December 1895; Madrid – 23 September 1936; Madrid (aged 40)	19 October 1934	25 October 1935 (1 year, 6 days)	Radical Republican Party
Sergio Álvarez de Villaamil		14 March 1889; Madrid – 7 May 1960; Madrid (aged 71)	25 October 1935	20 February 1936	Republican Liberal Democrat Party
Pedro Rico López		7 August 1888; Madrid – 1957; Aix-en-Provence (France)	20 February 1936	6 November 1936 (260 days)	Republican Union
Cayetano Redondo Aceña		7 August 1888; Segovia – 21 May 1940; Madrid (aged 51)	8 November 1936	23 April 1937 (259 days)	Spanish Socialist Workers' Party
Rafael Henche de la Plata		17 November 1886; Alcalá de Henares – 11 September 1961; Madrid (aged 74)	23 April 1937	28 March 1939 (2 years, 5 days)	Spanish Socialist Workers' Party
Melchor Rodríguez García		30 May 1893; Seville – 14 February 1972; Madrid (aged 78)	28 March 1939	28 March 1939 (hours)	None
Alberto Alcocer y Ribacoba		8 April 1886; Orduña – 30 May 1957; Madrid (aged 71)	1 April 1939	22 March 1946	FET y de las JONS
José; Moreno Torres; Count of Santa María de Babio		1 August 1900; Madrid – 19 May 1983; Torrelodones (aged 82)	22 March 1946	5 June 1952	FET y de las JONS
José; Finat y Escrivá de Romaní, Count of Mayalde		11 February 1904; Madrid – 9 June 1995; Madrid (aged 91)	5 June 1952	5 February 1965	FET y de las JONS
Carlos Arias Navarro		11 December 1908; Madrid – 27 November 1989; Madrid (aged 80)	5 February 1965	12 June 1973	FET y de las JONS
Miguel Ángel García-Lomas Mata		24 April 1912; Madrid – 24 September 1976; Madrid (aged 64)	12 July 1973	24 September 1976	FET y de las JONS
Juan de Arespacochaga y de Felipe		27 January 1920; Madrid – 1 October 1999; Madrid (aged 79)	24 September 1976	3 March 1978	Democratic Reform
José Luis Álvarez		4 April 1930; Madrid – 23 August 2023; Cartagena (aged 93)	3 March 1978	5 January 1979	Union of the Democratic Centre
Luis María Huete y Morillo		1 January 1929; Madrid	7 January 1979	19 April 1979 (102 days)	
Enrique; Tierno Galván		8 February 1918; Madrid – 19 January 1986; Madrid (aged 67)	19 April 1979	19 January 1986 (6 years, 275 days)	Socialist Workers' Party
Juan; Barranco Gallardo		13 August 1947; Santiago de Calatrava	19 January 1986	29 June 1989 (3 years, 161 days)	Socialist Workers' Party
Agustín; Rodríguez Sahagún		27 March 1932; Ávila – 13 October 1991; Paris (France) (aged 59)	29 June 1989	15 June 1991 (1 year, 351 days)	Democratic and Social Centre
José María; Álvarez del Manzano y López del Hierro		17 October 1937; Seville	15 June 1991	23 June 2003 (12 years, 8 days)	People's Party
Alberto; Ruiz-Gallardón Jiménez		11 December 1958; Madrid	23 June 2003	22 December 2011 (8 years, 182 days)	People's Party
Ana Botella Serrano (Note: From 22 December 2011 to 27 December 2011, Manuel Cobo Vega served as interim Mayor of Madrid)		23 July 1953; Madrid	27 December 2011	13 June 2015 (3 years, 168 days)	People's Party
Manuela; Carmena Castrillo		9 February 1944; Madrid	13 June 2015	15 June 2019 (4 years, 2 days)	Now Madrid
José Luis; Martínez-Almeida Navasqüés (Note: Inmaculada Sanz served briefly as interim Mayor of Madrid in April 2024 and again in July 2025.)		17 April 1975; Madrid	15 June 2019	Incumbent (7 years, 135 days)	People's Party

== See also ==
- Madrid
- History of Madrid
- Timeline of Madrid
