= Luis Figueroa y Casaus =

Spanish soldier, businessman, and merchant

- Born: Luis Figueroa y Casaus; 11 May 1781; Llerena, Badajoz, Spain
- Died: 1853 (aged 71-72); Barcelona, Catalonia, Spain
- Citizenship: Spanish
- Occupations: Soldier; Businessmen; Merchant
- Known for: Father of Ignacio Figueroa y Mendieta

Luis Maria Jose Marcelo Eduardo Figueroa Casaus (11 May 1781 – 1853) was a Spanish soldier, businessman, and merchant. An afrancesado, he supported King Joseph Bonaparte and then fought for Napoleon in the Battle of Waterloo as a commander. He was then exiled to Marseille, where he took a series of decisive steps to consolidate himself as one of the great merchants of the city and anticipate the Mediterranean lead trade. The surname Figueroa makes up the most important saga of businessmen linked to Spanish mining and metallurgy of the 19th century.

== Early and personal life ==
Luis Figueroa Casaus was born in 1781 in the town of Llerena, Badajoz, into a noble family. He was the son of Don Lorenzo de Figueroa y Messía de Monroy, a lawyer of the Royal Councils, Captain of Provincial Militias, and Perpetual Regidor of his House, who had married his second cousin Doña Teodomira Ignacia de Casaus Castilla y Caraballo del Pozo, born in Lora del Río in Seville.

In his youth, Figueroa moved to Seville to study law, but he soon abandoned this idea and decided to follow in the footsteps of another Extremadura native, Manuel Godoy, and joined the Royal Corps Guards as a cadet. Just as Godoy managed to become the prime minister of Charles IV of Spain, Figueroa rose thanks to belonging to a military unit close to the Spanish royal family. After three years of apprenticeship, he obtained the rank of second lieutenant of the Queen's Dragoon and settled at the Court, around 1807. In that same year, he married Doña María Luisa de Mendieta Ramírez de Arellano in Madrid on 5 July 1807, at the age of 26 years, and unlike what was common at the time, the couple only had one son, named Ignacio Figueroa y Mendieta, who was born in Llerena on 22 April 1808.

== Fighting for Napoleon ==
After the outbreak of the Peninsular War in 1808, Luis Figueroa, with a liberal and French-oriented disposition, hence an afrancesado, positioned himself at the side of King Joseph Bonaparte. In 1814 he accompanied Napoleon's brother into exile from France once the Spanish troops achieved their last victories. With firm convictions, Figueroa followed the emperor until the end. Enlisted as a commander in Napoleon's army, he participated in the Battle of Waterloo, where the imperial army suffered its last and definitive defeat in June 1815.

Figueroa then decides to settle in France and, taking advantage of his family contacts, he decided to settle in Marseille. At that time this coastal enclave was going through post-war precariousness while being a dangerous place for the former Bonapartists, closely watched by the police. Figueroa was on the verge of being expelled in 1823, however the order was never carried out.

== Building an empire ==
Figueroa's determination in the military field was also very present in his business and commercial activity because in a short period of time, he took a series of decisive steps to consolidate himself as one of the great merchants of Marseille. Since the first years of the 19th century, the international demand for lead grew exponentially, (Note: The demand for lead was growing spectacularly not only because of its military uses, but also because of its growing consumption in certain structures linked to the development of cities (pipes and roofs), as well as its use by the chemical industry (sulfuric acid, copper and silver refining) which would be joined by other more traditional ones such as pottery or of great strategic importance, for the manufacture of ammunition.) but at the moment, the production of the English mines had stopped supplying the international market, due to the strong pull of the Industrial Revolution in that country, so prices were growing spectacularly. The moment was thus propitious for Figueroa to anticipate enough to control both the lead mines and the lead trade coming from Spain through Marseille; and in fact, Figueroa closely followed the evolution of the mines of the Sierra de Gádor in the territory of Almería, then belonging to the Kingdom of Granada, where dozens of mines supplied the galena for the Crown factories installed in Canjáyar and Presidio since the end of the 18th century. In 1819, Figueroa, together with the Marseille businessman Antoine Protin, began negotiations with the government of the Trienio Liberal for the execution of some purchase contracts for the mineral and metal that were stored in the lead deposits of the state whose products were destined to extinct the high Public Debt.

In 1826, Figueroa, in partnership with the Catalan banker living in Madrid, Gaspar de Remisa, completed his first business in Spain, selling lead from the “Arrayanes” hatchery in the province of Jaén, when the mining sector was still the property of the State. After the liberalization of mining activity in 1825, the Figueroa trading house, associated with another trading house of another Spanish exile in Marseille, Luis María Guerrero, specialized in the export of lead from the Alpujarras to France through the port of Marseille and from there to the rest of Europe (the Mediterranean lead trade). In the 1830s, the association of Figueroa and Guerrero headed the list of lead exporters from the port of Almería. In the 1840s, after the short-lived attempt to organize a large metallurgical company with the participation of Guerrero, Manuel Agustín Heredia, and the Figueroas, the three trading houses controlled almost 75% of the metal shipped from Adra (17,000 tons), destined almost entirely to Marseille.

In Sierra de Gador he built some foundries, the most important being those he put into operation in Adra, where he spent long periods of time in what he called La Luisa and Orchards. In 1833, after having founded a company in Adra, he returned to Marseille, where he took charge of the Figueroa Trading House, leaving his son Ignacio Figueroa in charge of the subsidiary in Adra. Figueroa also owned a foundry located in the Marseille neighborhood of Le Rouet, which had the help of English metallurgical technicians and which expanded its activity to the desilting of silver leads imported from first-process foundries on the coast of Almeria.

== Later life ==
Figueroa never forgot his Spanish origin and his long-time service to the Spanish Royal House. In 1844, Queen María Cristina de Borbón, widow of Ferdinand VII, appointed him as the Gentleman of the Chamber of Her Majesty Queen Isabella II, who at that time was a minor of 14. The Figueroa patriarch had a great friendship with the Queen Mother, who was the Queen Governor during the years of Isabel's minority, to the point of having hosted María Cristina in her house in Marseille, on the occasion of the queen's exile during the Regency of Espartero (1840–1843).

The financial strength of the Figueroa family was the key to resisting one of the most important business crises, which occurred in 1848, coinciding with a revolution in France that left commercial activity in Marseille paralyzed for months.

== Death ==
Figueroa died in 1853, at the age of either 71 or 72 years old, leaving his only son Ignacio an estate valued at nearly 4 million francs, which had been built mostly from the lead business.

His former partner Manuel Agustín Heredia had died as a 60-year-old in 1846, so when Figueroa followed him to the grave just a few years later in 1853, this caused a delicate moment in which the test of these emblematic houses happened. The successor of the Heredia house Tomás (1819–1893) lost the main bases of the era due to a languid life, where little by little their activity faded away. The evolution of the Figueroa, however, was the opposite since Ignacio, who was 45 years old when he succeeded his father, unlike Tomás, who was only 27, was more aware of the negotiations due to having participated in all the remodeling that took place during the 1840s.

== Legacy ==
The port of Marseille became the capital of European lead until 1860 and the Figueroa house ended up controlling most of the supply of Spanish lead, originating from both the Southeast and the Linares Basin starting in the middle of the century. Based on this hegemony, an industrial emporium was built around this commercial plaza. Adra's investments and the control of the Alpujarra lead trade through the port of Marseille would become the pillars of one of the greatest fortunes in Spain.

Figueroa made a considerable fortune investing in mining companies dedicated to lead extraction in Andalusia. His companies would be inherited by his only son Ignacio, who received an education in Paris, and, after working for a time as the representative of the interests of his father in Spain, settled in Madrid in 1845. Ignacio was the father of Maria Francisca, José, Gonzalo, Álvaro (the Count of Romanones), and Rodrigo, spawning one of the most influential families in Spain during the Restoration period.

Within the metallurgical core that has resurfaced in Marseille since 1840 and is made up of eight factories, the Figueroa house produced at the beginning of the 1950s more than 40% of the manufactured lead and 50% of the silver obtained by the industries of the city.

== Bibliography ==
- Chastagnaret, Gérard (2000). "L'Espagne, puissance minière: dans l'Europe du XIXe siècle". Bibliothèque de la Casa de Velázquez. 16. Madrid: Casa de Velázquez. ISBN 84-95555-06-9. ISSN 0213-9758.
- Gortázar, Guillermo [in Spanish] (1989). "Las dinastías españolas de fundidores de plomo de Marsella: don Luis Figueroa y Casaus (1781-1853)" (PDF). Haciendo historia: homenaje al profesor Carlos Seco. Editorial Complutense, S.A. pp. 251–260. ISBN 84-7491-246-6. Archived from the original (PDF) on 2020-08-19.
- Moreno Luzón, Javier (1996). "El conde de Romanones y el caciquismo en Castilla (1888-1923)". Investigaciones Históricas: Época Moderna y Contemporánea. 16: 145–166. ISSN 0210-9425.
- Peña Guerrero, María Antonia; Sierra, María (2001). "Andalucía". El Poder de la Influencia: Geografía del Caciquismo en España (1875-1923). En: José Varela Ortega (Ed.). Madrid: Marcial Pons Historia y Centro de Estudios Políticos y Constitucionales: 17–45. ISBN 84-259-1152-4.
