= Jardín Botánico La Concepción =

Cultural property in Málaga, Spain

La Concepción Botanical Historical Garden
- Jardín Botánico Histórico La Concepción
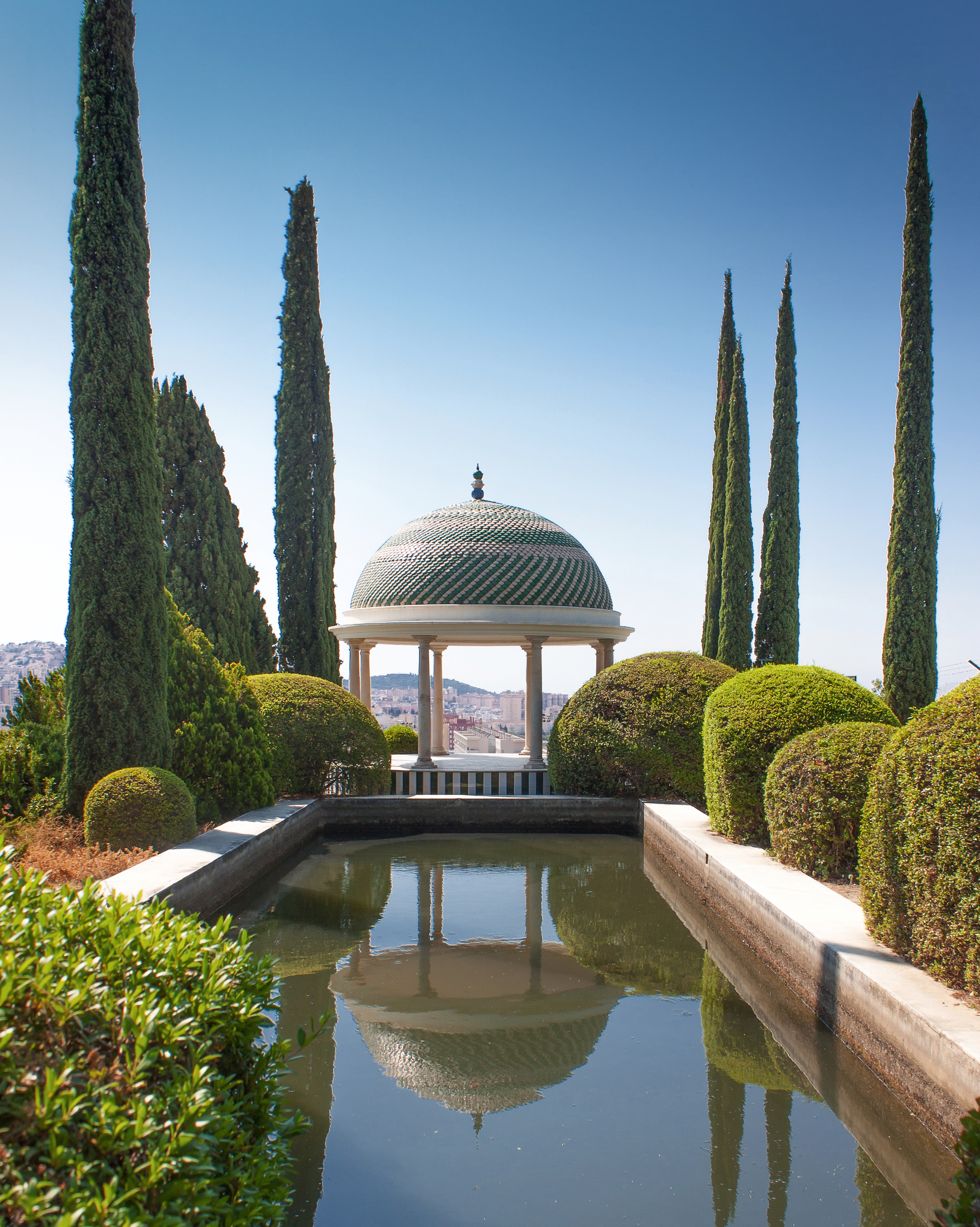
- Interactive map of La Concepción Botanical Historical Garden
- Type: Botanical Garden
- Location: Málaga, Spain
- Coordinates: 36°45′44″N 4°25′36″W

Spanish Cultural Heritage
- Type: Non-movable
- Criteria: Historic Garden
- Designated: 27 September 1943
- Reference no.: RI-52-0000023

The Jardín Botánico Histórico La Concepción is a landscape garden with over one hundred and fifty years of history. It is located at the northern entrance of the Spanish city of Málaga. This garden is one of the few gardens with subtropical plants that exist in Europe. It has more than fifty thousand plants, of two thousand species of tropical, subtropical, and autochthonous, highlighting the collection with more than one hundred different species of palms, bamboos, aquatic plants and its historical garden.

It originally was a recreational estate of a family of the upper bourgeoisie of the city from the mid-19th century until 1990 when it became public property. The Málaga City Council founded for its management the Municipal Botanical Board 'Ciudad de Málaga'.

== History ==
La Concepción was built around 1855 thanks to the work of the marriage formed by Jorge Loring y Oyarzábal and Amalia Heredia Livermore, marquis of the Casa Loring. Jorge Loring, one of the most influential people of the Málaga of the 19th century and personal friend of Cánovas del Castillo and of Francisco Silvela, was a successful businessman in addition to deputy to Cortes. His wife Amalia Heredia Livermore, daughter of the industrialist Manuel Agustín Heredia, was a cultured woman, interested in plants, books and archaeology. Thus, in La Concepción they treasured a substantial archaeological heritage of which there are still some remains in the form of Roman sculptures and mosaics; and a rich botanical heritage, thanks to the skill of a French gardener named Chamoussant among others.

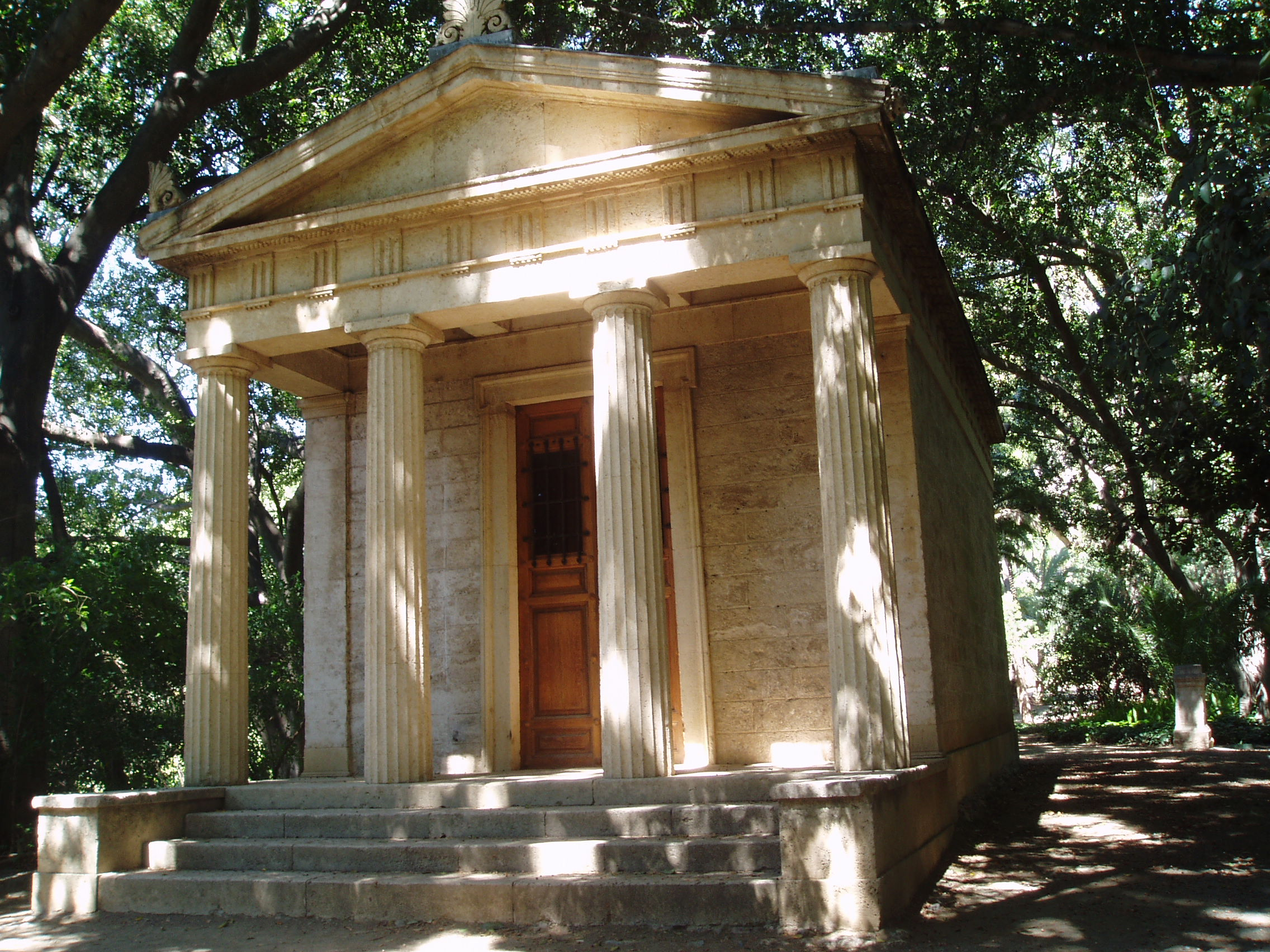
Templete tetrástilo of Doric order, built by the Loring family.

Following the financial bankruptcy of the Loring-Heredia family, the estate was bought in 1911 by the Echevarría Azcarate family (from the marriage of Rafael Echevarría Azcarate with Amalia Echevarrieta Mauri, making important improvements and expanding the collection of trees and palm trees. In 1943 the garden was declared a historical-artistic garden, today it's Bien de Interés Cultural. When the couple dies, the estate is managed by Amalia's brother, Horacio Echevarrieta, who maintained it until his death in 1963. From this point, the property goes into decline and progressive abandonment.

In 1990, the garden was acquired by the City Of Malaga and after four years of renovations and adaptation it opened up to the public. Since then, new spaces and gardens have been incorporated around the Historic Garden, in the form of themed gardens, highlighting those dedicated to palm trees, carnivorous plants and orchids, others to cacti and succulents or that of Around the World in Eighty Trees.

La Concepción occupies an area of fifty-five hectares, of which twenty-five belong to the historic garden. Next to it, there are thematic gardens and a large area of natural native Mediterranean forest that can also be visited; they are the so-called forest route and the viewpoints route in the upper area of the garden.

== Modern gardens ==
From the acquisition of the property by the Malaga City Council, different gardens were created with the modern characteristics of a botanical garden. These were gardens with collections arranged in such a way as to enable a more systematic and academic study than the historical garden allowed, originally conceived as a promenade garden. Among the largest routes and collections, it is worth highlighting the areas named: "Around the world in eighty trees", "The world map of palm trees", "The cactus garden", "The garden of Primitive plants", "The Rockery of Biodiversity ”and“ The hot stove ”, as well as some minor collections of bamboo, aquatic plants or vines.

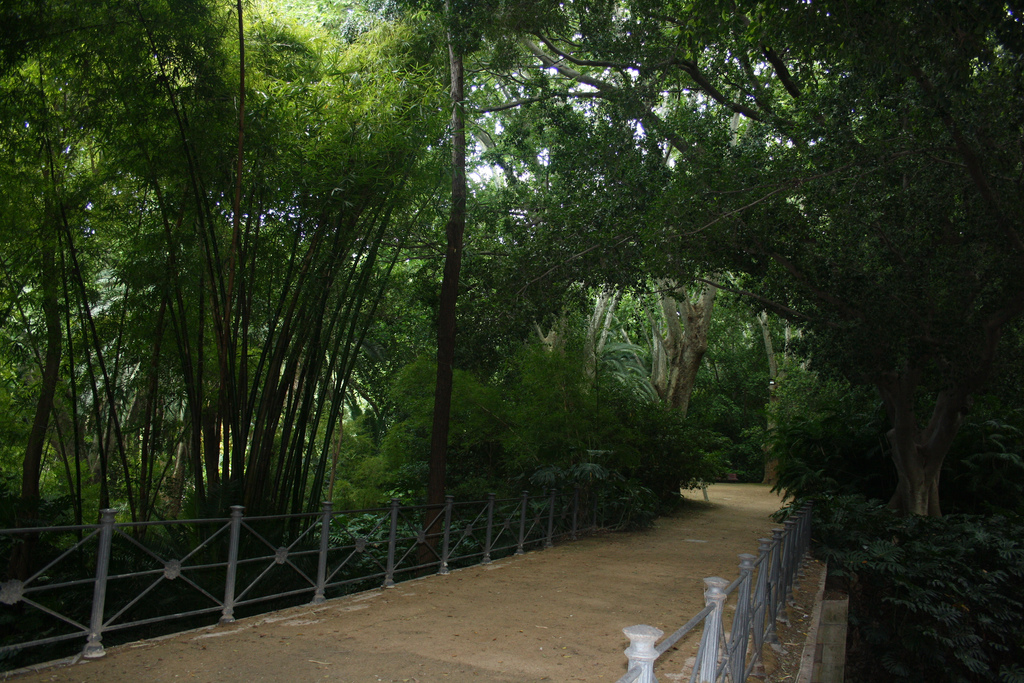
View of one of the paths.

=== Around the world in eighty trees ===
In 1997, the first modern botanical garden in La Concepción was created, focused on presenting the most frequent species on the five continents. This garden is organized as a path with trees on the right and left, arranged according to the continent of origin, totaling eighty specimens. Shrubs and vines have been planted among the trees, also separated by their usual geographic habitat, adding a hundred specimens from all parts of the planet.
