= Luis Figueroa =

Luis Figueroa may refer to:

- Luis Figueroa y Casaus (1781–1853), Spanish soldier and merchant
- Luis Figueroa Mazuela (1922–1976), Chilean trade union leader and politician
- Luis Figueroa Yábar (1928–2012), Peruvian film director, active in the cinema of Peru
- Luis Figueroa del Río (1941–2018), Chilean lawyer and political figure
- Luis Figueroa (baseball) (born 1974), Puerto Rican baseball player
- Luis Pedro Figueroa (born 1983), Chilean footballer
- Luis Figueroa (singer) (born 1989), Puerto Rican singer

== See also ==
- Luis de Figueroa (died 1523), Roman Catholic monk
- Luis Pérez Figueroa (1833–1903), Mexican general
