= Frederick Loring =

Frederick Loring may refer to:

- Frederick Wadsworth Loring (1848–1871), American journalist, novelist and poet
- F. G. Loring (Frederick George Loring, 1869–1951), English naval officer, wireless expert, and writer
