= José Figueroa y Torres =

Pioneer of football in Spain

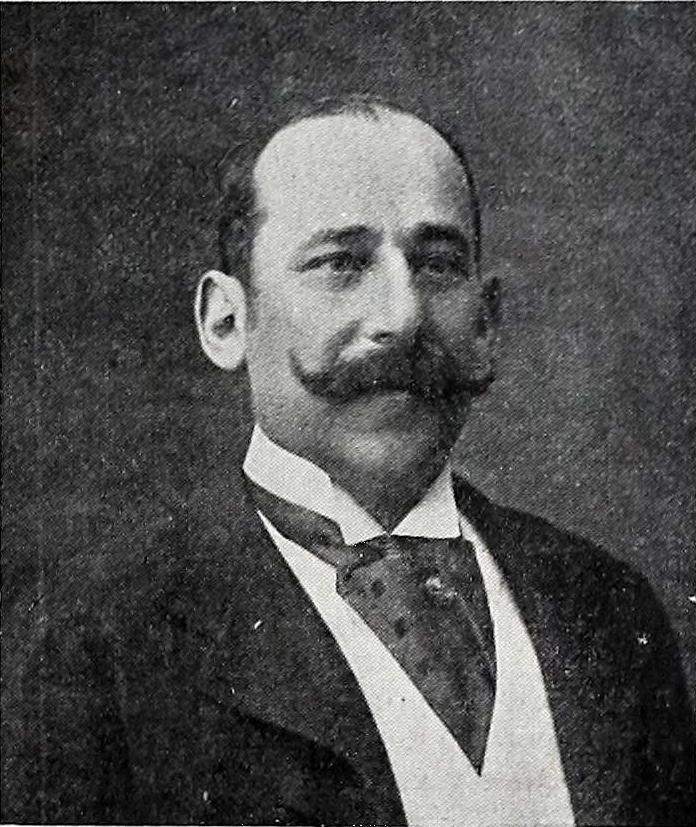
- Born: José Figueroa y Torres; 8 March 1857; Marseille, France
- Died: 11 June 1901 (aged 44); Granada, Spain
- Occupation: Footballer
- Known for: Introducing association football to Madrid; sports administration
- Father: Ignacio Figueroa y Mendieta

José Figueroa y Torres (8 March 1857 – 11 June 1901), also known by his noble title of Viscount of Irueste, was a Spanish politician of the Restoration. He was a football pioneer in Madrid, being the fundamental head behind the foundations of the very first legalized sports club in the country, Cricket and Football Club of Madrid in 1879, serving the entity as its first-ever president.

== Biography ==
Born in Marseille on 8 March 1857, he was the son of Ignacio Figueroa y Mendieta, and the brother of Álvaro (the Count of Romanones), Gonzalo and Rodrigo. He was part of one of the most influential families in Spain during the Restoration period. He was the first president of the Cricket and Football Club of Madrid, founded in 1879, the first legally registered sports society in Spain. Recent studies place it as one of the proto-clubs that pioneered and expanded football in Spain, together with Exiles Football Club (1876) and the Rio Tinto English Club (1878). It is not known with certainty what the fate of this team was, although it seems that it disappeared a few years later.

He premiered as a deputy in the Cortes de la Restauración in 1884, after being elected by the electoral district of Guadalajara. He married María Rosario Loring y Heredia on 3 April 1883, the third daughter of the Marquises of Casa Loring, Jorge Loring y Oyarzábal and Amalia Heredia Livermore. Between 1891 and 1892 he was a deputy for the Ourense district of Valdeorras. In 1896, he obtained a deputy act in the successive elections of 1896, 1898, 1899, and 1901 for the Jaén district of Baeza.

He held the position of Director General of Agriculture, Industry, and Commerce between September and December 1892.

He was among the few people attending the execution of Michele Angiolillo on 20 August 1897, the murderer of Antonio Cánovas del Castillo. Shortly after, he took office on 12 September of that same year as civil governor of the province of Madrid, holding the position until October. During his tenure, he imposed fines on theater companies that finished their performances after one in the morning.

Member of the Order of Santiago, he held the noble title of 3rd Viscount of Irueste.

He died in the tower of Justice of the Alhambra in Granada on the night of 11 to 12 June 1901. Suffering from an illness, he vomited blood and at midnight he lost his life on the spot.
