= Wickenburg Massacre =

Stagecoach attack in the Arizona Territory (1871)

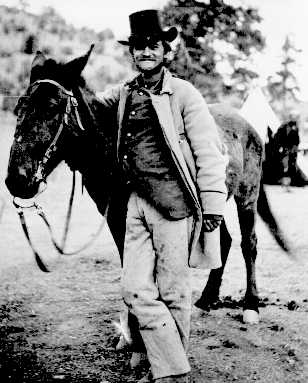
- Frederick Wadsworth Loring in a photograph taken two days before his death
- Location: Wickenburg, Arizona
- Date: November 5, 1871
- Attack type: Killing
- Deaths: 6
- Injuries: 2
- Victim: White European Settlers
- Perpetrator: Natives

The Wickenburg Massacre was the November 5, 1871, murder of six stagecoach passengers en route westbound from Wickenburg, Arizona Territory, headed for San Bernardino, California, on the La Paz road.

== Massacre ==
Around mid-morning, about six miles from Wickenburg, the stagecoach was attacked by 15 Yavapai warriors, who were sometimes mistakenly called Apache-Mohaves, from the Date Creek Reservation. Six men, including the driver, were shot and killed. Among them was Frederick Wadsworth Loring, a young writer from Boston working as a correspondent for Appleton's Journal and assigned to cover a cartographic expedition led by Lieutenant George Wheeler. One male passenger, William Kruger, and the only female passenger, Mollie Sheppard, managed to escape. According to Kruger, Sheppard eventually died of the wounds she received.

Memorial plaques have been installed near the site several times, including in 1937 by the Arizona Highway Department and in 1948 and 1988 by the Wickenburg Saddle Club.

Wickenburg Massacre
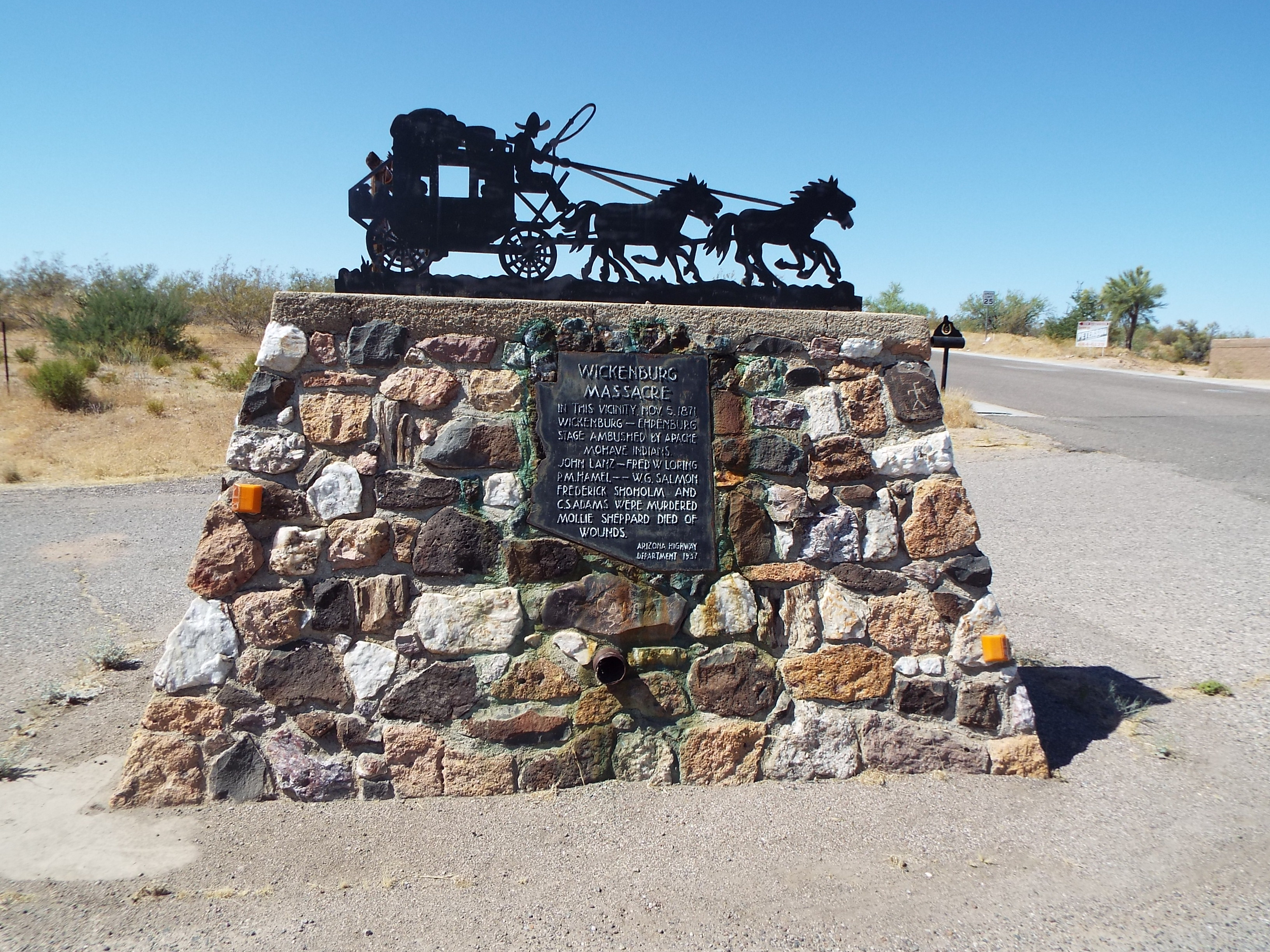
Vicinity marker where the Wickenburg Massacre took place (33.963080°N 112.797239°W)

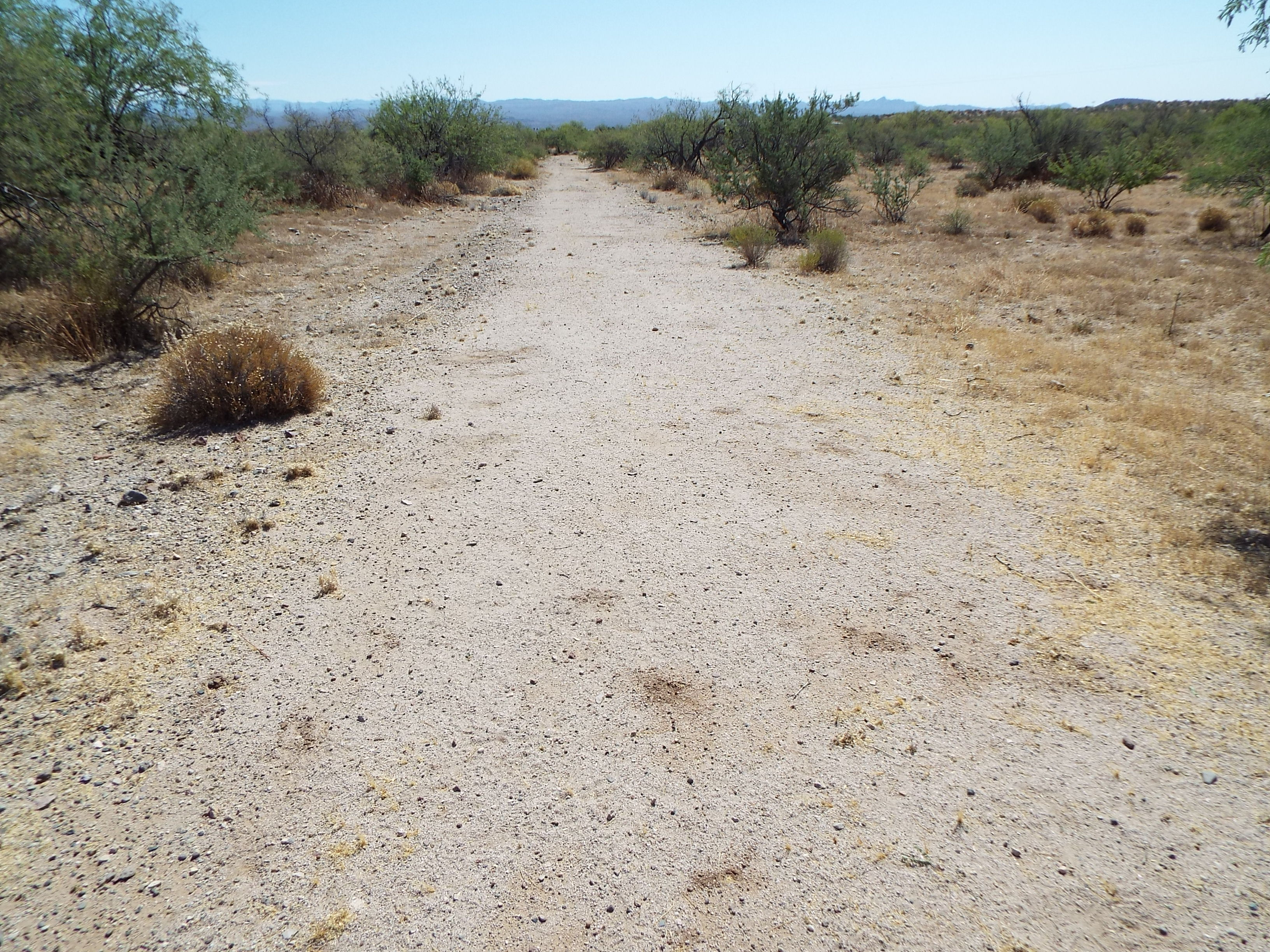
Old Stage Coach Road where the November 5, 1871, Wickenburg Massacre occurred

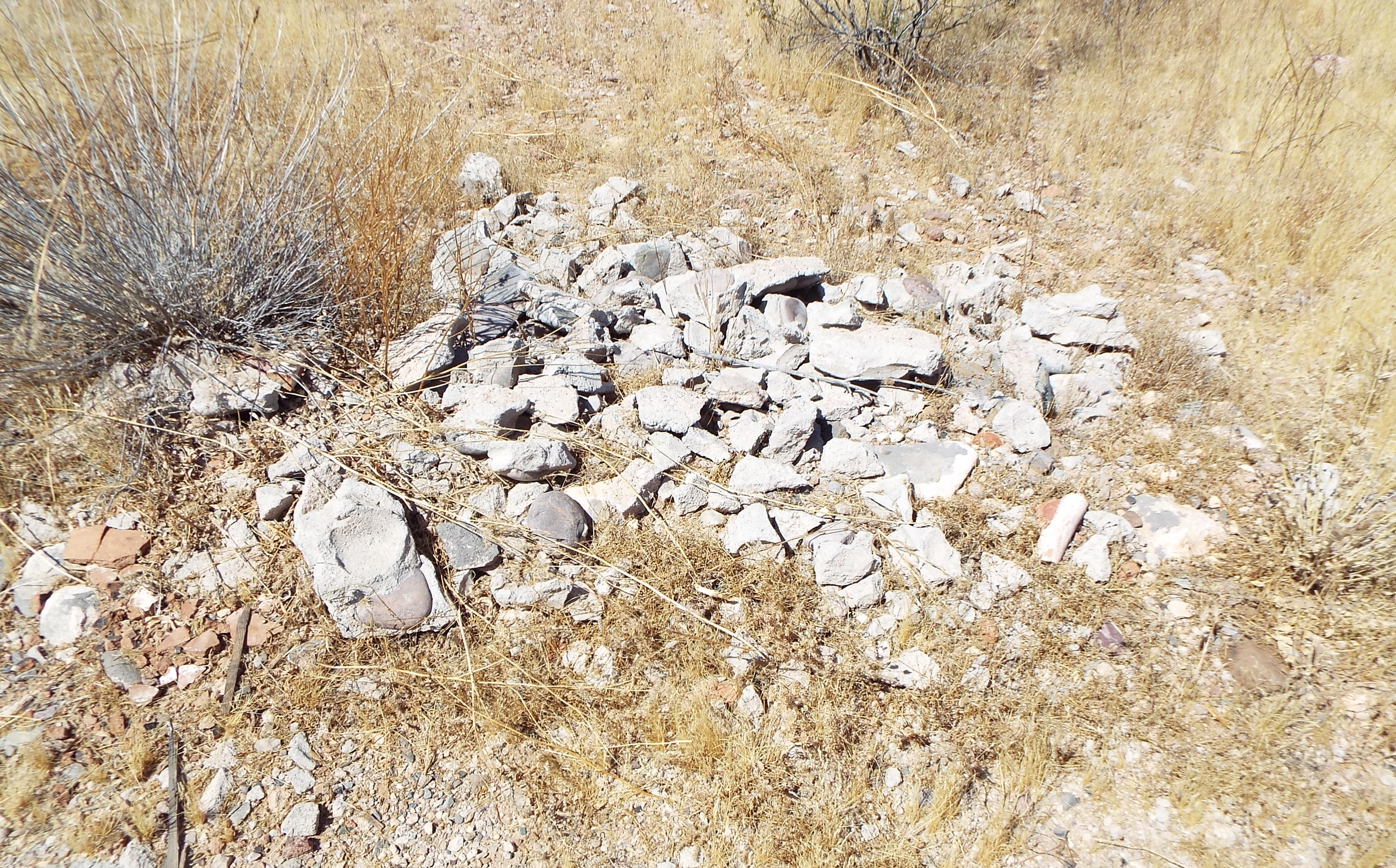
Grave of one of the victims of the Wickenburg Massacre

The Wickenburg Massacre was featured on an April 12, 1996, episode of Unsolved Mysteries. And on November 6, 2025, YouTube.com's, The History Guy: History Deserves to Be Remembered channel, an episode was posted "The Wickenburg Massacre: A Wild West Mystery".

== See also ==
- List of Indian massacres in North America
