= Henry Loring =

Henry Lloyd Loring (c.1784–1822) was an English churchman. He was the first Archdeacon of Calcutta, serving from 1814 until his death on 4 September 1822.

The son of Joshua Loring of Englefield, Berkshire, he was the grandson of Joshua Loring the naval officer. He was educated at Magdalen College, Oxford, graduating B.A. in 1806, and becoming a Fellow a year later.

== Family ==
His grandfather Joshua Loring was an 18th-century colonial American naval officer in British service (and a great great great great grandson of immigrant Thomas Loring. His brother John Wentworth Loring, was a Royal Navy officer of the early nineteenth century known for his service in the Napoleonic Wars as a frigate commander; while his nephew William Loring was the first Commander-in-Chief of the Australia Station.
