= Vicente Cabeza de Vaca y Fernández de Córdoba, Marquis of Portago =

Spanish politician

The Marquis of Portago
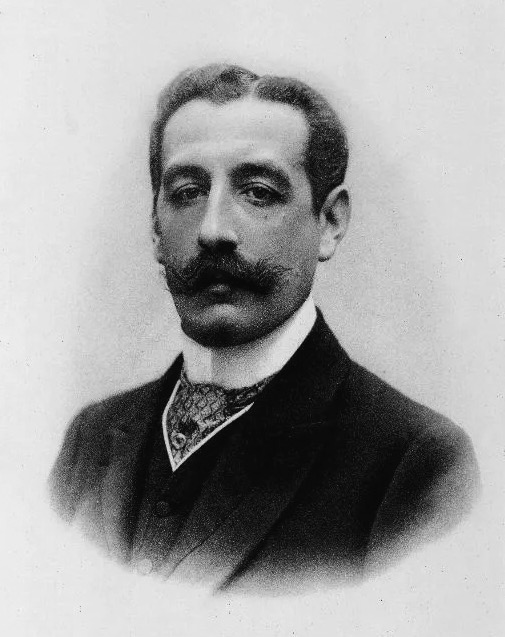
- Photographed by Christian Franzen, 1913

Mayor of Madrid
- In office 23 December 1902 – 27 July 1903
- Preceded by: Alberto Aguilera
- Succeeded by: Marquis of Lema

Personal details
- Born: 17 February 1865 Madrid, Spain
- Died: 15 November 1921 (aged 56) Madrid, Spain
- Party: Conservative Party
- Occupation: Politician

Vicente Cabeza de Vaca y Fernández de Córdoba, 9th Marquis of Portago (1865–1921) was a Spanish politician. A member of the Conservative Party, he served as Mayor of Madrid from 1902 to 1903 and as Minister of Public Instruction and Fine Arts in 1920.

== Biography ==
Born on 17 February 1865 in Madrid, son to Mariano Cabeza de Vaca y Morales and Francisca de Borja Fernández de Córdoba y Bernaldo de Quirós.

He served as civil governor of Seville. He was later elected as member of the Congress of Deputies, serving in the lower house in representation of Don Benito (Badajoz) and Granada from 1899 to 1907. He served as Director–General for Posts and Telegraphs and as (elected) municipal councillor of Madrid.

A prominent silvelista (follower of Francisco Silvela within the Conservative Party) and politically close to Eduardo Dato, he has appointed as Mayor of Madrid via Royal Order signed on 10 December 1902, serving from 23 December 1902 to 27 July 1903. His brief tenure before his replacement by the Marquis of Lema was signified by two issues: a draft for the project of Gran Vía and the tramway of El Pardo. He was member of the managing committee of the Centro de Acción Nobiliaria, created in 1909. He became Senator por derecho propio (in virtue of his nobiliary status) in 1909.

He served as Minister of Public Instruction and Fine Arts from September to December 1920, part of a cabinet presided by Dato. He retired from the post due to illness, dying in Madrid on 15 November 1921.

Government offices
Preceded by Alberto Aguilera y Velasco	Mayor of Madrid; 1902–1903	Succeeded by Salvador Bermúdez de Castro O'Lawlor; Marquis of Lema
Preceded by Luis Espada Guntín	Ministry of Public Instruction and Fine Arts; 1920	Succeeded by Tomás Montejo y Rica
Spanish nobility
Preceded by Mariano Cabeza de Vaca y Morales	Marquis of Portago	Succeeded by Antonio Cabeza de Vaca y Carvajal
