= Narciso García-Loygorri, 2nd Duke of Vistahermosa =

Spanish politician, diplomat (1837–1905)

The Most Excellent The Duke of Vistahermosa
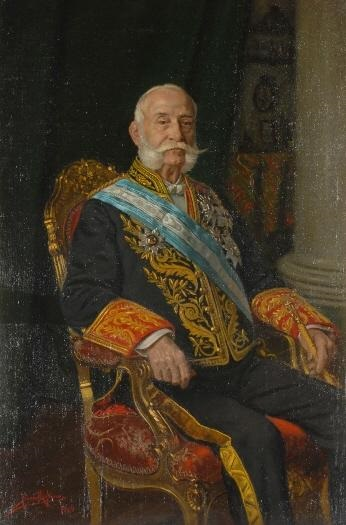
- Portrait by José Díaz Molina, 1905

Mayor of Madrid
- In office 19 August 1890 – 8 October 1890
- Monarch: Alfonso XIII
- Preceded by: Cayetano Sánchez Bustillo
- Succeeded by: Faustino Rodriguez-San Pedro

Personal details
- Born: 5 December 1837 Madrid, Spain
- Died: 29 October 1905 (aged 67) Madrid, Spain

Narciso García-Loygorri y Rizo, 2nd Duke of Vistahermosa (5 December 1837 – 29 October 1905) was a mayor of Madrid for 50 days between 19 August until 8 October 1890. He served as ambassador in Russia, and also in Switzerland. Senator between 1889 and 1890. By this time, being a Grandee (Grande de España) also implied to be a Senator. He received the Royal and Distinguished Order of Charles III.
