= Alberto Bosch y Fustegueras =

Spanish engineer, lawyer, and politician

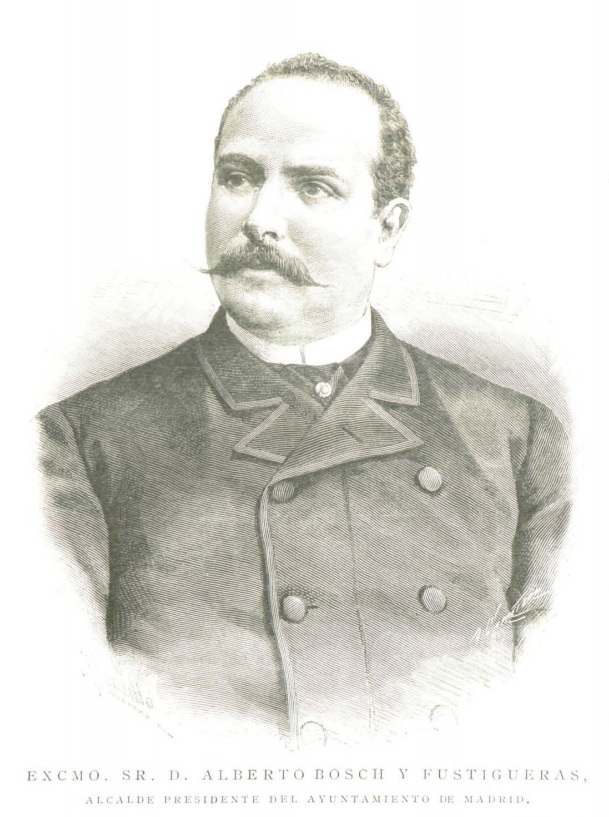
- Alberto Bosch on 22 October 1885
- Born: Alberto Bosch y Fustegueras; 26 December 1848; Tortosa, Catalonia, Spain
- Died: 13 May 1900 (aged 51); Madrid, Spain
- Citizenship: Spanish
- Occupations: Engineer; Lawyer; Writer; Politician
- Known for: Mayor of Madrid

Mayor of Madrid
- In office 1885–1885
- Preceded by: Gonzalo de Saavedra y Cueto
- Succeeded by: Andrés Mellado
- In office 1891–1892
- Preceded by: Faustino Rodríguez
- Succeeded by: Marqués de Cubas

Mayor of Madrid
- In office 23 March 1895 – 14 December 1895
- Preceded by: Joaquín López Puigcerver
- Succeeded by: Aureliano Linares Rivas

Alberto Bosch y Fustegueras (26 December 1848 – 13 May 1900) was a Spanish engineer, lawyer, and politician, who served as a Mayor of Madrid twice, in 1885 and in 1891–92, and later as a Development Minister of Spain during the Regency of Maria Christina of Austria. He was also a Deputy of Spain for Roquetes, Tarragona, between 1881 and 1884, a Senator for the Economic Society of Madrid between 1886 and 1890, and then for life between 1891 and 1900.

He was a president of the Real Sociedad Económica Matritense de Amigos del País and of the Faculty of Sciences and Letters, and also worked as an assistant professor of Mathematical Physics at the Central University. He was the author of many and varied scientific productions, most notably Estudios trigonométricos, Manual de Astronomía popular, La agricultura española en el siglo XIX, and Geometría aplicada a las Artes.

== Early and education ==
Alberto Bosch was born in Tortosa on 26 December 1848, as the son of Miguel Bosch and Maria Antonia Fustegueras y Bagá. His father, a forestry engineer and surgeon at the same time, had a certain public profile in the former area, as a member of official organizations and author of technical works.

Bosch completed his secondary and university studies in Madrid, the city where the family lived for a long time, and accumulated up to three degrees, obtaining a doctorate in law and also graduating in Exact Sciences and civil engineering. As a result of the wide range of his degrees, he diversified his actions in his first years of professional activity, beginning careers in medicine and pharmacy. His political career only began in 1873, at the age of 25, when he joined the Conservative Party.

== Professional career ==
As an engineer, Bosch was a member of the Roads, Canals, and Ports school and worked in the early 1870s on the topographic map prepared by the Geographic Institute. He maintained his assignment to said body in the following years, although in a supernumerary position.

As a lawyer, Bosch presided over the Legal Academy in Madrid in the 1876–77 academic year and was a professor at the Royal Academy of Jurisprudence and Legislation. Although he barely worked, his participation can be cited in the report prepared in 1882 by a group of jurists for the Transatlantic Company, regarding the awarding of the mail steamer service to the Antilles. He was also a director of the Caja de Ahorros y Monte de Piedad de Madrid.

As an academic, Bosch was closely linked to the Real Sociedad Económica Matritense de Amigos del País, and in 1875, he published in the context of its centenary, the work El Centenario: apuntes para la historia de la Sociedad Económica Matritense. Later he came to preside over it and obtained several elections to the Senate for the corporate seat belonging to the entity. On 23 March 1890 he entered the Spanish Royal Academy of Sciences with the speech "Applications of mathematics to moral and political sciences", and he stayed there until his death 10 years later. As a mathematician, he also entered the University of Madrid as an assistant professor of Mathematical Physics. He published many and varied scientific productions, including Estudios trigonométricos (1875) at the university level and, with a more informative intention, Manual de Astronomía popular (1879) and Elementos de fisiología (1882).

== Politic career ==
Bosch began his political career around 1873 when he joined the Conservative Party. He held his first parliamentary representation in 1878, when he premiered as a deputy for the district of Roquetes, Tarragona, within the Cortes of 1876–1879, the first of the Restoration. He repeated his seat in the elections of 1879 and 1881, and in 1886 he was appointed senator by the Economic Society of Madrid.

A member of the Conservative Party of Antonio Cánovas del Castillo, Bosch was in the sector headed by Francisco Romero Robledo. While he was Minister of the Interior, he was appointed general director of Penal Establishments (9 March 1880 to 12 February 1881), and as such he attended the International Penitentiary Conference held in Paris in November 1880, and wrote a technical memory upon his return. Upon taking office, he had to cease being a deputy; however, he was re-elected in the following year, in the elections of 1881, wherein a demonstration of his growing political strength, he obtained simultaneous election as deputy for Roquetas and as senator for the Economic Society of Madrid, and despite being in the opposition, he opted for the first of these representations. Always an active deputy, Bosch consolidated himself in the Cortes of 1881–1884 as one of the main assets of the so-called "hussars", the political sector headed by Romero. In 1883 he was appointed member of the official commission in charge of organizing Spanish participation in the International Colonial and Export Exhibition in Amsterdam.

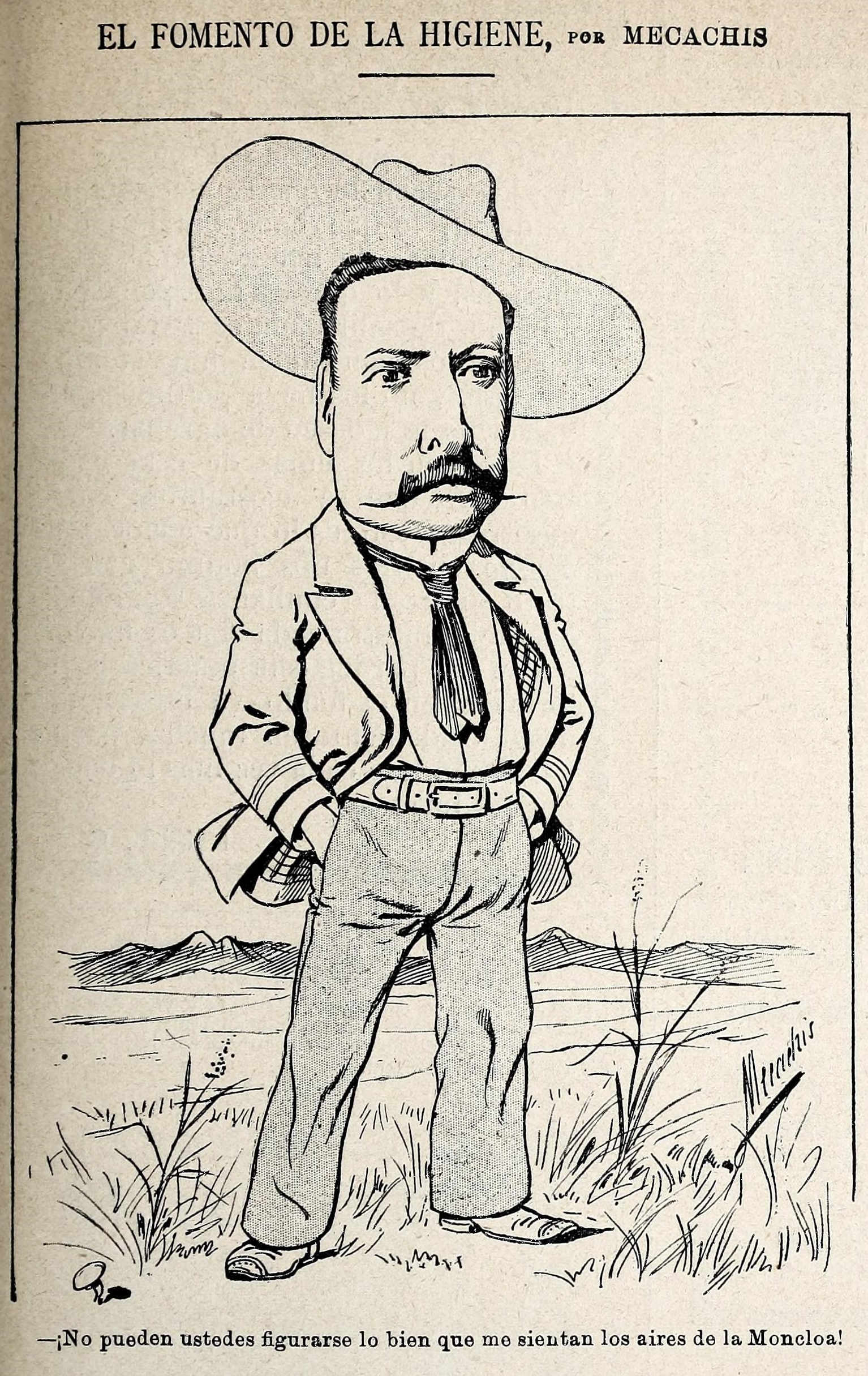
Bosch caricatured by Mecachis.

In 1884, Bosch married Elena Herreros Alvarruiz, and the couple had at least three children, María, Carlos, and Enrique Bosch Herreros. Herreros was a native of Tarazona and had properties in El Bonillo, Albacete, so in the 1884 elections, he obtained the position of deputy for the district of Albacete, which he held in the Cortes of 1884–1886. With Romero again in the Government, in January 1884 he was appointed undersecretary of the Ministry and took care of several specific missions, as delegate of the Government in Catalonia for the organization of the health service and interim general director of Charity and Health and also of Posts and Telegraphs. He was then mayor of Madrid from 3 April to 30 November 1885, a position in which he had to face the cholera epidemic of that year, more fortunately than his political boss Romero, who had to resign as minister due to his performance in the same circumstances.

At the end of 1885, after the death of Alfonso XII and the transfer of power from Cánovas to Práxedes Mateo Sagasta, Bosch followed Romero in his split from the party and in its political evolution in the following years. He was a director of the short-lived Liberal-Reformist Party between 1886 and 1888, and he then re-entered the conservative ranks in 1891. In the 1886 elections, his candidacy for Alcaraz, Albacete, was defeated, but he was able to obtain the Senate seat for the Economic Society of Madrid, which he exercised in the Cortes from 1886 to 1890, displaying enormous parliamentary activity.

In the 1891 elections, Bosch returned to Congress representing Roquetes again, repeating his 1884 feat of being elected as a deputy for Roquetas and senator for the Economic Society of Madrid, and he once again opted for the first of these positions, which in turn he left on 28 January 1892 to take up a life senatorship. In November 1891, and in the context of distancing between Francisco Silvela and Cánovas and rapprochement between him and Romero, he again held the mayor's office of Madrid between 26 November 1891 and 6 November 1892, while Romero held the Ultramar portfolio. Between 1891 and 1893, he wrote several letters addressed to Cánovas on various matters related to the mayor of Madrid, such as the opening of Velázquez Street and placement of the painter's statue, prohibition on the sale of cod, as well as other personal and political matters, such as the election of the deputy for Roquetas. With a delicate municipal situation and the hostility of the Silvela faction, his approval of the municipal budgets and an unpopular tax that caused street riots, such as the so-called mutiny of the greengrocers in July 1892, and triggered a relentless investigation of the municipality by the Minister of the Interior, Raimundo Fernández-Villaverde, until Bosch finally presented his resignation in November 1892 and Romero followed his lead, willing to support the former lieutenant of his hussars. Villaverde also proposed a prosecution for alleged irregularities, but the request to prosecute him did not prosper in the Senate. In the subsequent strong debates in Congress and the Senate, Bosch led a new challenge to the Government with harsh accusations against Villaverde, which precipitated the fall of the Conservative Government.

In 1895, in a new Government chaired by Cánovas and in a position of challenging the causes that had motivated the crisis of 1892, Romero took over the portfolio of Grace and Justice, while Bosch held his first and only portfolio, that of Development between 23 March and 14 December 1895. In the few months he held the office, he organized the State's civil engineering corps, secondary education, arts and crafts education, and promoted fish farming, among other actions. However, the issue of the City Council reappeared, in a new episode of the confrontation between Romero and Silvela, with the opening of a judicial process against councilors and contractors and a large citizen demonstration, sponsored by the Círculo de la Unión Mercantil. The involvement of people trusted by Bosch led him to resign, and he was once again followed by Romero, who also presented his own.

In 1897, Bosch distanced himself from Romero due to his position regarding the reforms in Cuba. After the murder of Cánovas in that same year and the reorganization of the different conservative factions, the separation became even greater, and Bosch then approached the group called the Santo Sepulcro. In March 1900, shortly before his death, he was appointed member of the Technical Board created at the initiative of the Social Reform Commission for the prevention of accidents at work.

Bosch continued his career in the Senate, first as a senator for the Economic Society of Madrid between 1886 and 1890, and then for life between 1891 and 1900.

== Personal life ==
His sister Josefa was married to the politician Carlos Martín Murga. His son, Enrique Bosch y Herrera, was also a deputy. He had several decorations, such as the Grand Cross of the Order of Naval Merit.

During his second mayorship of Madrid, the Count of Romanones delivered an ignominious tirade to Bosch from his parliamentary seat in 1892, so much that the offended called for a duel, which was held on 10 July 1892 in Leganés. The combatants crossed two shots.

== Death ==
Bosch died in Madrid on 13 May 1900, at the age 51, due to uremia, he was buried on his farm in El Bonillo.

== Works ==
- Estudios trigonométricos ("Trigonometric Studies") (1875)
- El Centenario: apuntes para la historia de la Sociedad Económica Matritense (The centenary: notes for the history of the Matritense Economic Society) 1875
- Manual de Astronomía popular ("Manual of Popular Astronomy") (1879)
- Elementos de fisiología ("Elements of Physiology") (1882)
- La agricultura española en el siglo XIX ("Spanish Agriculture in the 19th Century")
- Geometría aplicada a las Artes ("Geometry Applied to the Arts")

== Bibliography ==
- Antón del Olmet, Luis; Torres Bernal, José de (1922). Los grandes españoles. Romanones. Madrid: Imprenta de Juan Pueyo.
