= Gonzalo Figueroa y Torres =

Pioneer of football in Spain

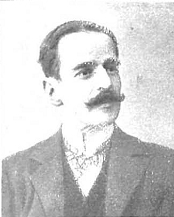
- Gonzalo photographed by Compañy
- Born: Gonzalo Figueroa y Torres; 19 August 1861; Madrid, Spain
- Died: 18 October 1921 (aged 60); Lausanne, Switzerland
- Occupations: Politician; financier
- Known for: Introducing association football to Madrid; sports administration
- Father: Ignacio Figueroa y Mendieta

Mayor of Madrid
- In office 1904–1905
- Preceded by: Marquis of Lema
- Succeeded by: Eduardo Vincenti y Reguera

Senator of the Province of Guadalajara
- In office 1896–1921

Gonzalo Figueroa y Torres (19 August 1861 – 18 October 1921) was a Spanish politician of the Restoration, and Mayor of Madrid between 1904 and 1905. He held noble titles such as Count of Mejorada del Campo and Duke of Las Torres. He is best known for being the very first Spanish representative in the International Olympic Committee and as the fundamental head behind the foundation of the Spanish Olympic Committee in 1912.

== Early life ==
He was born in Madrid on 19 August 1861, as the son of Ignacio Figueroa y Mendieta, and the brother of Álvaro (the Count of Romanones), José Figueroa y Torres (Viscount of Irueste) and Rodrigo (Duke of Tovar). He was part of one of the most influential families in Spain during the Restoration period.

== Political career ==
He premiered as a deputy in the Cortes for Baeza in the 1891 Spanish general election. He was senator for the province of Guadalajara in two legislatures (1896–1898 and 1898–1899) and, from 1899, a senator for life, holding this position until his death in 1921. In 1904, he replaced the Marquis of Lema as Mayor of Madrid.

He combined all this political activity with an intense dedication to big business, through the firms of the Figueroa house, participating, among others, in the mining and electrical industries, and even in banking, as he was one of the founders of the Banco Español de Crédito (now Banesto).

Among his noble titles, he held those of Viscount of Irueste, Count of Mejorada del Campo, Marquis of Villamejor and Duke of Las Torres, the latter granted on 4 April 1907. He was also a gentleman of the Chamber of His Majesty King Alfonso XIII, as well as Knight of the Order of Santiago and Master of the Royal Order of Granada.

== Olympic career ==
He was chosen as the first Spanish representative in the International Olympic Committee by Prince Carlos de Borbón. He sent the letter of acceptance to Pierre de Coubertin on 21 February 1902. In 1906 he was part of the International Olympic Committee that organized the 1906 Olympic Games. With the arrival of the Government of his brother Álvaro, who served as Prime Minister three times between 1912 and 1918, he managed to create the Spanish Olympic Committee on 23 November 1912, of which he was president until his death.

== Financier ==
In his role as patron, he financially assisted works of culture and social action throughout his life, notably, the personal and financial support that he always gave to the projects of Saint Pedro Poveda College. After having contributed to the support of the schools of the Sacred Heart of Jesus in Guadix (1902), he favored the academies of the Teresian Association, of whose first patronage he accepted to be president (1918-1921).

== Death ==
When his health began to deteriorate, he moved to Switzerland to rest, accompanied by his wife, María Manuela O'Neill y Salamanca, whom he had married in Madrid, on 8 September 1892, and their minor daughters. The Duke of Las Torres died in October 1921 in Lausanne, Switzerland, at the age of 60. His remains were transferred to Madrid and, from the capital, to Guadalajara, where they were buried in the Palace of the Dukes of the Infantado.

Preceded by Marquis of Lema	Alcalde de Madrid; 1904-1905	Succeeded by Eduardo Vincenti y Reguera

== Bibliography ==
- Cuenca, Carlos Luis de (1 December 1904). D. Gonzalo de Figueroa. La Ilustración Española y Americana. p. 382. ISSN 1889-8394.
- Gortázar, Guillermo [in Spanish] (1989). "Las dinastías españolas de fundidores de plomo de Marsella: don Luis Figueroa y Casaus (1781-1853)" (PDF). Haciendo historia: homenaje al profesor Carlos Seco. pp. 251–260. ISBN 84-7491-246-6. Archived from the original (PDF) on 19 August 2020.
- Peña Guerrero, María Antonia; Sierra, María (2001). El poder de la influencia: geografía del caciquismo en España (1875-1923) [The power of influence: geography of caciquism in Spain (1875-1923)]. Marcial Pons Historia y Centro de Estudios Políticos y Constitucionales. pp. 17–45. ISBN 84-259-1152-4.
- Tuñón de Lara, Manuel (1967). Historia y realidad del poder (el poder y las élites en el primer tercio de la España del siglo XX) [History and reality of power (power and elites in the first third of 20th century Spain)]. Edicusa.
