= Cricket and Football Club of Madrid =

Spanish football club

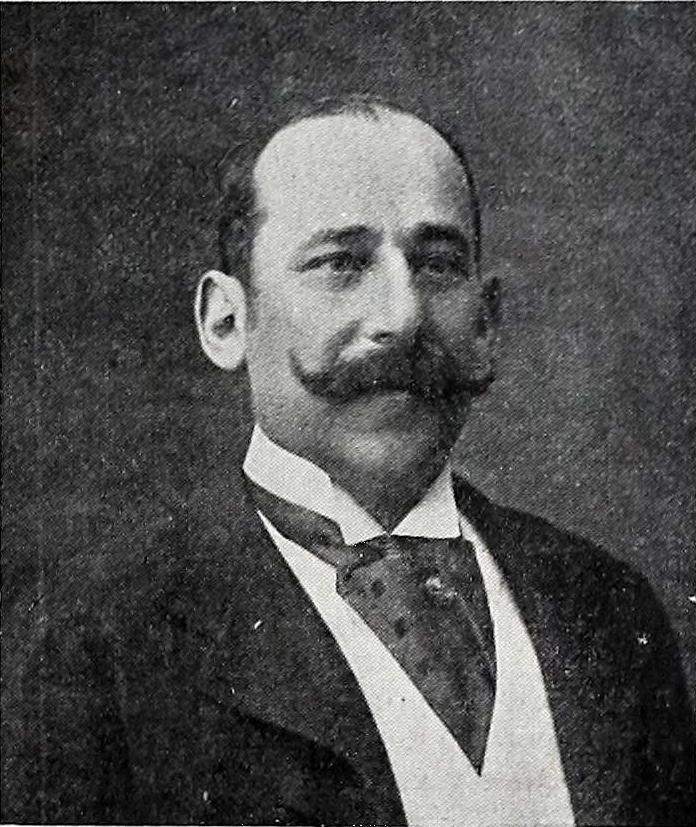
- José Figueroa y Torres, president of the club.
- Founded: October 1879
- Dissolved: Unknown
- Ground: Real Hipodromo de la Casa de Campo
Home colours	Away colours

The Cricket and Foot-Ball Club of Madrid was a Spanish society founded in Madrid at the end of 1879, which was registered at the time of its creation, thus becoming the first legalized sports club in the country. It was founded in the capital in October 1879 under the protection of King Alfonso XII, who was named its Honorary President.

It had a section dedicated to football due to the rapid growth of the said sport in England. It was thus the first club formed by native Spaniards (although their presence was somewhat insignificant) for football. Recent studies place it as one of the proto-clubs that pioneered and expanded football in Spain, together with Exiles Football Club (1876) and the Rio Tinto English Club (1878). It is not known with certainty what the fate of this team was, although it seems that it disappeared a few years later.

== Origins ==
In the late 1870s, various English workers scattered throughout the peninsula began to establish informal groups that were dedicated to different recreational practices, especially cricket and football, particularly in Spanish ports, such as the ones in Vigo, Andalusia, (Huelva and Seville) and Bilbao, who were the regions that most felt this movement, and then Madrid to a lesser extent. Because of the huge influence and presence of the English in the first steps of football in Spain, it was England who echoed the relevant news that came from Spain about the legalizations or establishment of football clubs, since the news about these British football pioneers in Spain had to be told and broadcast as a new "conquest", even if it was a simple project. Thus, on 10 May 1879, the London Standard published, in the middle of a brief paragraph among others concerning the Spanish capital, a curious note referring to the possible constitution of a cricket and football society in Madrid that said the following:

Several English residents in Madrid, and Spanish noblemen and gentlemen have decided to establish a cricket club similar to those of Seville and Xeres. King Alfonso has kindly granted the use of a capital ground at the Royal seat of Casa de Campo, and through General Echagüe, intimated that he would honor the club with his patronage.

— London Standard, 10 May 1879

Unsurprisingly, the news went completely unnoticed in Madrid and by extension, in all of Spain, due to the lack of interest from the readers in football. Alfonso XII was appointed as the entity's honorary president through the mediation of General Rafael de Echagüe, a well-known military man and politician who held several important positions in his different facets in life and with whom the King had a great relationship and who volunteered to gain institutional guardianship and, taking advantage of the situation, get the King to give them the old Hippodrome of the Royal seat of the Casa de Campo, a sports venue used between 1845 and 1867 by the Spanish Horse Breeding Promotion Society, which at that time was in disuse as Madrid had a new, more modern Hippodrome, the Hipódromo de la Castellana, which would later also be a football field. It was at the Casa de Campo where the people of Madrid took their first steps in football.

== Members ==
At the time of its establishment, it had a solid structure that made it possible to foresee a long life for the company, as was reflected in its first meeting to decide the directive and the approval of its regulations and statutes:

After the General Meeting where the Club Regulations were approved, the Management was appointed, which was constituted as follows:
President: José Figueroa y Torres
Vice Presidents: Álvaro Bertrán de Lis, Mr. Greentul
Directors: Juan White, Count of Villanueva
Accountant: Leonardo de Fesser
Treasurer: Mr. Velasco
Secretaries: Rafael de Echagüe, Carlos Heredia

— London Standard, 16 November 1879

The members of Cricket and Foot-ball Club of Madrid was made up of a large number of noblemen of those times, as well as distinguished gentlemen who belonged to the Spanish or British high aristocracy and bourgeoisie, holding important positions in the Madrid society in the 1870s. Besides King Alfonso XII, the Honorary President of the club, the presidency was granted to José Figueroa y Torres, the Viscount of Irueste, who was barely 22 years old as a young man with a splendid future and good fortune as the eldest son of the Figueroa y Torres family. Together with him, there were other nobles such as the Viscount of Benaesa and the Count of Villanueva, who surrounded themselves with a wide circle of friendships among those who stood out from the military and wealthy bourgeois with whom they shared business, leisure and ideas.

After its establishment, the club played its first cricket match on 24 October 1879, forming two teams among the members of the society. The event closed with a banquet and was maintained for years as a traditional practice after each sporting event.

== Decline and Collapse ==
Little more is known about these proto-clubs, which are presumed to have ended up being dissolved due to the still embryonic and not very prolific sport, and above all to the distance between the existing football societies in the country, so they could be able to formalize any dispute. It is not known with certainty what the fate of this team was, although it seems that it disappeared a few years later.

In 1880, the same cricketers and footballers of 1879 led by José de Figueroa, brought the sport of athletics to Madrid, which at the time was one of the only European capitals without an athletics stadium.
