= Nigel Southward =

British doctor (born 1941)

Sir Nigel Ralph Southward, KCVO (born 1941) is a retired British doctor, and apothecary to the Queen.

Southward is the son of the surgeon Sir Ralph Southward FRCP, who had been the previous apothecary to the Queen. He was educated at Trinity Hall, Cambridge (receiving the MB BChir degree in 1965), and Middlesex Hospital Medical School.

He started work as a doctor at Middlesex Hospital in 1965 and became a physician at the Royal Berkshire Hospital and the Central Middlesex Hospital the following year. In 1975, he was appointed Apothecary to the Queen and to the Household, and to the Households of Princess Margaret, Princess Alice, and Duke and Duchess of Gloucester. He was also appointed Apothecary to the Household of Queen Elizabeth the Queen Mother on New Year's Eve 1986. Southward retired in 2003.

Southward was appointed a Lieutenant of the Royal Victorian Order in the 1985 New Year Honours, promoted to Commander in the 1995 New Year Honours, and to Knight Commander on retirement in February 2003.
