= Salvador Bermúdez de Castro, Marquis of Lema =

Spanish noble, politician and lawyer

The Most Excellent Salvador Bermúdez de Castro 2nd Duke of Ripalda
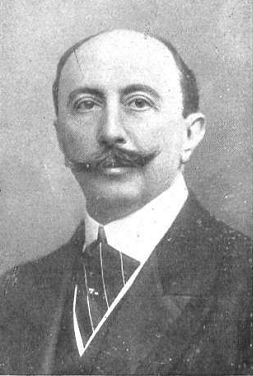
- Portrait by Kaulak

Mayor of Madrid
- In office 25 July 1903 – 22 December 1904
- Preceded by: Vicente Cabeza de Vaca
- Succeeded by: Gonzalo Figueroa y Torres

Minister of State
- In office 27 October 1913 – 9 December 1915
- Monarch: Alfonso XIII
- Prime Minister: Eduardo Dato
- Preceded by: Antonio López Muñoz
- Succeeded by: Miguel Villanueva y Gómez
- In office 11 June 1917 – 13 November 1917
- Preceded by: Juan Alvarado y del Saz
- Succeeded by: Manuel García Prieto
- In office 20 July 1920 – 14 August 1921
- Prime Minister: multiple
- Preceded by: Manuel González-Hontoria
- Succeeded by: Manuel González-Hontoria

46th Governor of the Bank of Spain
- In office 14 March 1922 – 2 January 1923
- Preceded by: Luis Sedó
- Succeeded by: Tirso Rodrigáñez y Sagasta

Seat O of the Real Academia Española
- In office 5 May 1935 – 20 January 1945
- Preceded by: Julián Ribera
- Succeeded by: Félix de Llanos y Torriglia

Personal details
- Born: Salvador Bermúdez de Castro y O'Lawlor; 1 November 1863 Madrid, Spain
- Died: 20 January 1945 (aged 81) Madrid, Spain

Salvador Bermúdez de Castro y O'Lawlor, 2nd Duke of Ripalda, Marquis of Lema (1 November 1863, in Madrid – 20 January 1945) was a Spanish noble, politician and lawyer who served as Minister of State during the reign of Alfonso XIII.

== Biography ==
He was born in Madrid, the son of Manuel Bermúdez de Castro y Díez (1811–1870) a senator and Minister for the Interior and Foreign Affairs, and María de la Encarnación O’Lawlor y Caballero (1830–1908), youngest daughter of Joseph O'Lawlor (1768–1850), an Irish-born Spanish general and governor of Granada. His cousin Richard Lalor was an Irish nationalist member of the British House of Commons. He married María, a daughter of Joaquín Sánchez de Toca y Calvo and María Ballester y Bueno.

The Duke was a prominent Spanish author, conservative politician and nobleman. He inherited the Dukedom of Ripalda and the Marquessate of Lema from his paternal uncle. A deputy for Oviedo (1891–1923), he served as Minister for Foreign Affairs 1919–21, 1917, 1913–15; Mayor of Madrid 1903–4 and Governor of the Bank of Spain (1922–3).

He was the author of numerous works including "De la Revolución a la Restauración", "Spain since 1815" and the autobiographical "Mis Recuerdos 1801-1901".

Late in life, he was one of the 22 jurists who signed the "opinion on the illegitimacy under the operating powers of the 18th of 1936 July", a report drafted in 1938 and commissioned by the Francoist faction during the Civil War that served as ad-hoc legitimation for the 1936 coup d'etat.
