= Manuel García Barzanallana =

Spanish politician (1817–1892)

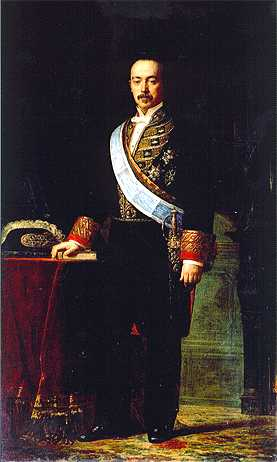
Manuel García Barzanallana; portrait by Dionisio Fierros (1867)

Manuel García Barzanallana García-Frías, 1st Marquess of Barzanallana (17 August 1817, Madrid - 29 January 1892, Madrid) was a Spanish politician and government official who served as minister of finance during the reign of Isabella II and as president of the Senate during the reign of Alfonso XII.

== Biography ==
His father was head of the Customs Office in Asturias. He studied in several cities, ending at the University of Barcelona, where he graduated in 1840. After working for four years as a lawyer in Madrid, he became a civil servant in the Ministro de Hacienda and, in 1845, was promoted to Assistant Director in the Customs Office.

In 1846, he was elected to the Congress of Deputies on the Moderate Party ticket, representing Cangas de Tineo. Between then and 1865, he was returned to office several times, representing various constituencies.

In 1853, he became director-general for customs and was appointed to his first term as minister of finance in 1856. The following year, he became a member of the newly created Royal Academy of Moral and Political Sciences and later served as its president. He began his second term as finance minister in 1864 and, in 1866, he was appointed senator for life. Later that same year, Queen Isabella created him Marquess of Barzanallana.

Following the Bourbon Restoration, he represented Oviedo in the Senate as a member of the Moderate Party. In 1875, he was appointed President of the Council of State and participated in drafting the Constitution of 1876. From 1876 to 1881, he served as President of the Senate.

He was a Knight in the Order of the Golden Fleece and a recipient of the Order of Charles III.
