= Manuel Semprún y Pombo =

Spanish lawyer

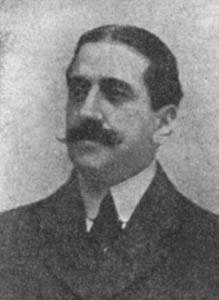
Portrait of Semprún y Pombo (c. 1906–07)

Manuel Semprún y Pombo (11 September 1868 – 30 November 1929) was a Spanish lawyer. He served as Mayor of Valladolid (1906–1907) and Madrid (1927).
