= Alberto Aguilera =

Spanish politician and lawyer

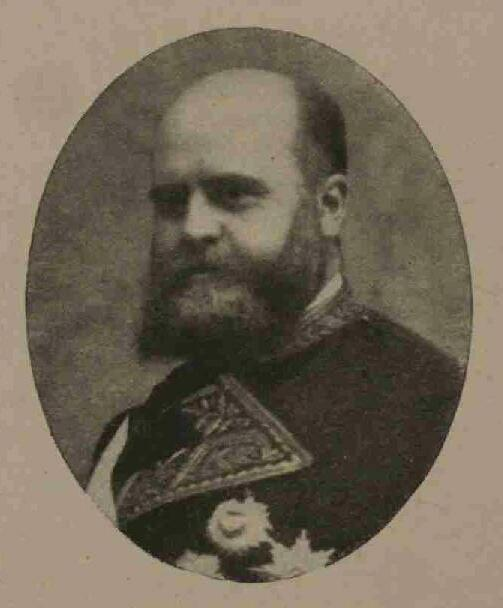
- Born: 7 August 1842
- Died: 25 December 1913 (aged 71)
- Awards: Grand Cross of the Order of Charles III (1898); Grand Cross of the Civil Order of Beneficence (1911); Grand Cross of the Military Merit - White Badge (1886)
- Position held: Member of the Congress of Deputies (1886–1903), (1873–1874), Senator of the Kingdom (1903–1913), civil governor of Murcia Province (1872–1872), (1873–1874), (1906–1913)

Alberto Aguilera y Velasco (August 7, 1842 – December 25, 1913) was a Spanish politician and lawyer.

He was Minister of Interior of Spain during the regency of Maria Christina of Austria and mayor of Madrid on several occasions between 1901 and 1910.

He was originally a member of the Liberal Party and was chosen deputy in Congress by the district of Granada Province in the successive elections celebrated between 1886 and 1903.

He was Spain's Minister of the Interior between March 12 and November 4, 1894, in a government presided over by Práxedes Mateo Sagasta.

== Mayor ==
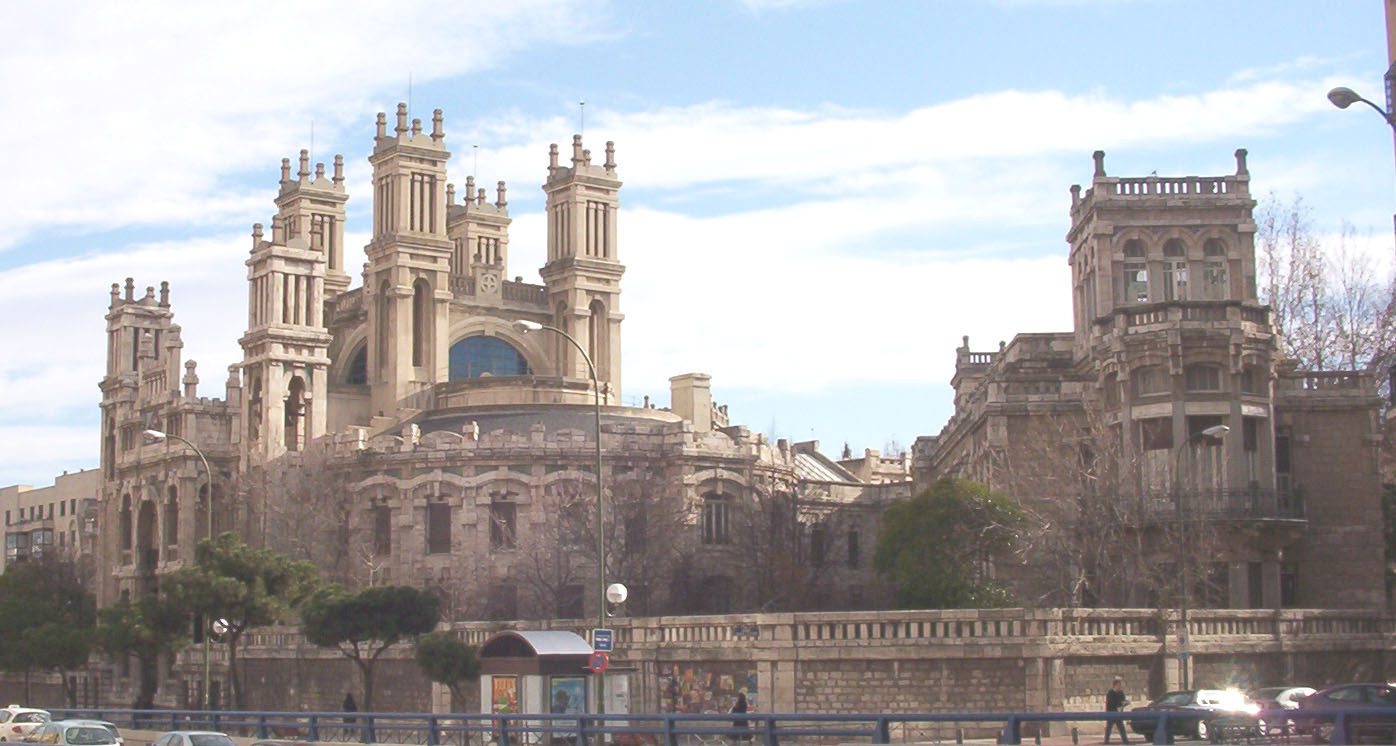
Aguilera inaugurated the Hospital de Maudes during his post as mayor of Madrid

As mayor of the capital of Spain he was involved in numerous important events and left an impression. Soon after becoming mayor, he organised the inauguration of the throne of Alfonso XIII of Spain, carried out on June 5, 1902. Monuments dedicated to historical people were erected including Héroe de Cascorro, Juan Bravo Murillo and Lope de Vega.

Later in 1902, Aguilera opened the Hospital de San Pedro de los Naturales and worked with architects such as Jose Lopez Sallaberry and Francisco Andres Octavio to develop the city. In 1906 the Parque del Oeste was created and in 1908 construction began on another hospital, Hospital de Maudes.

He died in 1913.
