= Joshua Loring =

American politician

Captain Joshua Loring
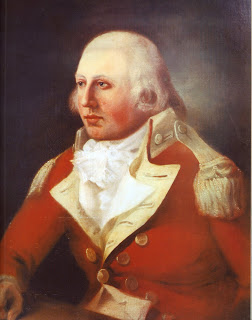
- Born: 3 August 1716; Boston, Massachusetts Bay Colony
- Died: September 1781 (aged 65); Highgate, England, Great Britain
- Relatives: Joshua Loring, Jr., son Henry Lloyd Loring, son Sir John Wentworth Loring, grandson
- Military career
- Allegiance: Great Britain
- Branch: Royal Navy
- Service years: c. 1736-1760
- Rank: Commodore
- Conflicts: King George's War; French and Indian War
- Other work: member of the Massachusetts Governor's Council under colonial Governor Thomas Gage

Joshua Loring (3 August 1716 – September 1781) was an 18th-century colonial American naval officer in British service. During the French and Indian War, he served as a commodore in the Great Lakes region and was active during much of the Ontario and Quebec campaigns.

== Biography ==
Born in Boston, Massachusetts to parents Joshua and Hannah (Jackson) Loring, and a great-great-grandson to colonist Thomas Loring, he was apprenticed as a tanner but instead chose to enlist in the Royal Navy as a young man. He rose to command a privateer during King George's War, however he was captured by the French in 1744. Held as a prisoner in Louisbourg, Nova Scotia for several months, he was eventually released and was made a captain on 19 December 1757 on HMS Squirrel.

== Seven Years' War ==
During the French and Indian War, he was involved in naval operations on Lake George and Lake Champlain in 1759 and served under General James Wolfe at the capture of Quebec later that year. Transferred to Lake Ontario, he commanded the advance guard at the Battle of the Thousand Islands while accompanying Field Marshal Jeffrey Amherst with his thrust against Montreal in August 1760. During the campaign, Loring was seriously wounded at an engagement on Lake Ontario and retired at half-pay due to his injuries.

== Later life ==
Later known as the Loring-Greenough House, the home Loring abandoned to join the Loyalist cause

Loring settled in Jamaica Plain and lived at Loring-Greenough House for over a decade. He was appointed as a member of the governor's council by Governor Thomas Gage, a position which made him so unpopular that he was attacked by mobs. A popular story recounts that, asked by an old friend what he would do when faced by a choice between remaining loyal and supporting the popular spirit of revolt, Loring replied "I have always eaten the King's bread, and always intend to."

However the Loring Genealogy suggests this was not a decision made lightly nor in advance: "He decided after serious consideration and consultation with friends, "the whole night through." In the morning he took his horse, rode to Boston and joined the English commander."

Loring was forced to flee, with his family, to the safety of the British Army's garrison in Boston in August 1774. He was denounced by the Massachusetts Provincial Congress as "an implacable enemy to their country" on 30 March 1775. The Lorings remained in Boston until 17 March 1776, when the British Army left Boston for Halifax, evacuating as it went those Loyalists who had sought refuge in the city. The Lorings traveled on from Halifax to England, having been named in the Massachusetts Banishment Act of 1778. Their home and property in Jamaica Plain, used as a hospital by the rebels during the siege of Boston, were confiscated by the state in 1779 and sold at auction. Loring received a royal pension until his death at Highgate, England in 1781.

== Family ==
Loring's eldest son, Joshua Loring, Jr., served as high-sheriff in Suffolk County, Massachusetts and was Commissary General of American prisoners-of-war in New York from 1777 until 1783. Together with William Cunningham, he was held responsible for the deaths from starvation and disease of thousands of Americans held prisoner on ships moored in New York Harbor. "[B]ut it is not easy to ascertain the truth, or to determine his personal responsibility in the treatment of prisoners." He was discharged from his office on the grounds of corruption and departed for England, where he died in 1789. Joshua Loring, Jr's son, John Wentworth Loring, served in the Royal Navy and rose to the rank of admiral.

Henry Lloyd Loring, another son of Joshua Loring, Jr., also had a successful career in the service of Britain, becoming an archdeacon of Calcutta.
