= Frederick Wadsworth Loring =

American journalist (1848–1871)

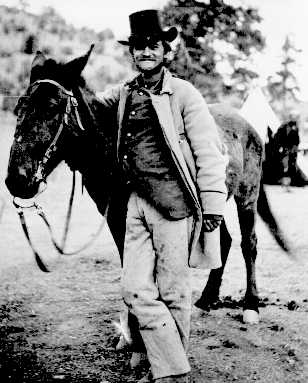
Frederick Wadsworth Loring, in his campaign costume, with his mule "Evil Merodach". Taken about 48 hours before the Wickenburg massacre

Frederick Wadsworth Loring (December 12, 1848 – November 5, 1871) was an American journalist, novelist and poet.

Loring was born on December 12, 1848, in Boston, Massachusetts, to David and Mary Hall Stodder Loring. He was a fifth great grandson to immigrant Thomas Loring. He graduated from Phillips Academy, Andover, in 1866, and then from Harvard University, where he first made his mark with contributions to the Harvard Advocate, in 1870. Inheriting a love of literature from his mother, who died when he was eleven, he quickly gained in stature as an up-and-coming American author. In 1871, he published a novel, Two College Friends, and a book of poems, The Boston Dip and Other Verses. Two College Friends, in which two Harvard students serve together in the Civil War, has been singled out as an important example of the representation of romantic male friendship. He also made numerous contributions, both fiction and non-fiction, to such periodicals as The Atlantic Monthly, Appleton's Journal, Old and New, The Independent, and Every Saturday during this time. That he was connected to Boston's literary circles is evidenced by the first preface to the 1872 collective novel, Six of One by Half a Dozen of the Other: An Every Day Novel. The novel, written by Harriet Beecher Stowe, Adeline D.T. Whitney, Lucretia P. Hale, Frederic Beecher Perkins, Edward Everett Hale, and Loring, was finished and published after Loring's death with Loring's contributions finished by the other authors.

== Wickenburg Massacre ==
In the spring of 1871, Appleton's Journal sent Loring as a correspondent on a cartographic expedition to Arizona led by Lieutenant George M. Wheeler of the US Army Corps of Engineers. The articles Loring wrote included "A Council of War," "A Glimpse of Mormonism," "Silver Mining in Nevada," and "The Valley of Death." Their party suffered several setbacks, and in August 1871 Loring wrote to his employers from Death Valley: "I am bootless, coatless, everything but lifeless. I have had a fortnight of horrors. This morning an Indian fight capped the climax. However, I am well and cheerful." Although they escaped from the valley, his party's carriage was attacked on November 5 by a band of Yavapai near Wickenburg, Arizona, while on the way to La Paz. That ambush came to be known as the Wickenburg Massacre. The driver, Loring, and four other passengers were killed.

After his death, he was mourned by Charles Reade as the most promising of all young American authors.

Several of Loring's poems, including "In the Old Churchyard at Fredericksburg" and "The Old Professor," perhaps alluding to Elbridge Jefferson Cutler (1831-1870), Professor of Modern Languages, Harvard University (1865-1870) have appeared in American verse anthologies.

== Bibliography ==
- Two College Friends (1871)
- The Boston Dip and Other Verses (1871)
- Six of One by a Half Dozen of the Other: An Every Day Novel (1872)
