= Amalia Heredia Livermore =

Spanish philanthropist and collector

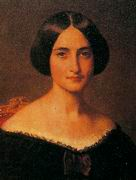
- Born: 3 March 1830; Málaga, Spain
- Died: 16 October 1902 (aged 72); Madrid, Spain
- Occupation: Philanthropist
- Spouse: Jorge Loring, 1st Marquis of Casa Loring

Amalia Herédia Livermore (3 March 1830 – 16 October 1902) was a Spanish patron, collector, researcher, and philanthropist, as well as a promoter of arts and culture.

== Early years and education ==
Amalia Heredia Livermore was born in Málaga, 1830. She was the tenth daughter of the industrialist Manuel Agustín Heredia Martínez and Isabel Livermore Salas. From childhood, she received a careful education of Catholic roots typical of the bourgeoisie of the time. She grew up in a refined environment that would encourage her love of the fine arts and included numerous trips abroad. She became a cultured and intelligent woman.

== Career ==
She married Marquis Jorge Loring Oyarzábal in 1850. He was a business entrepreneur. They had nine children.

After marriage, she transformed her residence in La Concepción, Málaga, into a botanical garden, thereby establishing Jardín Botánico La Concepción with her husband. She stood out for her philanthropy with several projects in Malaga including, assisting with the financing necessary to build the Hospital de San Julián together with others, placing the first stone during the construction of the Civil Hospital (1862), and establishing the College of Asunción.

Heredia Livermore and her husband acquired the tables of Lex Malacitana in order to start an archaeological collection, the Loringiano Museum. She was one of the founding partners of the Royal Spanish Society of Natural History. She was also a dame of the Order of Queen Maria Luisa.

When the Sexenio Democrático occurred, the couple supported the monarchist-liberal movement and moved to Madrid shortly before the Bourbon restoration. They were friends of the politician Antonio Cánovas del Castillo, who was a distant relative of hers.

Oyarzábal died in 1900 and she died as well two years later. They were buried in the Heredia family vault in the Cemetery of San Miguel de Málaga.
