= Jorge Loring, 1st Marquis of Casa Loring =

Spanish noble

Jorge Loring y Oyarzábal
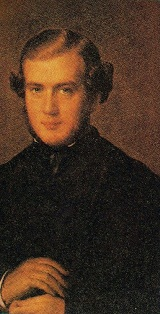

Marquis de Casa Loring
- In office 1856–1901
- Preceded by: First Creation
- Succeeded by: Jorge Loring y Heredia, 2nd Marquis de Casa Loring

Personal details
- Born: Jorge Loring; 20 August 1822 Málaga, Spain
- Died: 11 February 1901 (aged 78) Spain
- Spouse: Amalia Heredia
- Children: 8
- Parent(s): George Loring and Maria Del Rosario Oyarzabal
- Occupation: Businessman, member of Parliament, noble

Jorge Loring y Oyarzábal, 1st Marquis of Casa Loring (20 August 1822 – 11 February 1901) was a Spanish noble, politician and businessman. His grandson Jorge Loring Martinez created the company Talleres Loring, an aircraft manufacturer that produced important aircraft such as the Loring R-1, the Loring R-2 or the Loring R-3.

== Biography ==
Born on August 20, 1822 in Málaga, Spain, Jorge was the son of George Loring of Hingham, Massachusetts, and Maria Del Rosario Oyarzabal, of Cádiz. He was a fourth great grandson of New England immigrant Deacon Thomas Loring.

=== Education and citizenship ===
Like his brothers, he was educated in the United States, where he studied engineering at Harvard. He held citizenship in the United States and in Spain.

=== Marriage and family ===
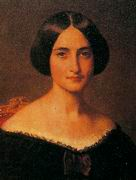
Amalia Heredia Livermore

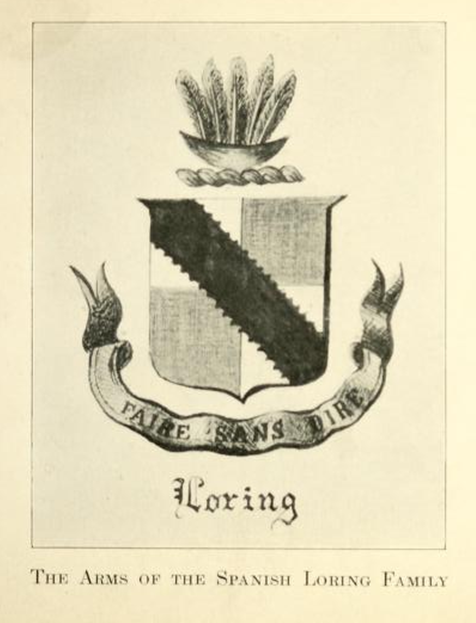
Arms of the Spanish Lorings

In 1850 he married Amalia Heredia Livermore of Málaga, herself a daughter of Manuel Heredia and Isabel Livermore. She was "an educated and intelligent woman" raised with an education "typical of the bourgeoisie of the time: refined, strong belief in Catholicism, foreign travel and a flair for fine arts."

They had eight children, five of whom became or married Spanish nobility. A grandson, Jorge Loring Martinez, excelled as an aviation entrepreneur and inventor. A great grandson, Jorge Loring Miró SJ, is a widely published Spanish Jesuit priest.

A third great grand daughter, Vittoria Eugenia Alvarez de Toledo y Marone-Cinzano, is the 7th and current Marquesa de Casa Loring and a cousin, once removed, of King Juan Carlos of Spain.

=== Career and title ===
He built (or helped build) the first railroad in Andalusia, from Córdoba to Málaga. He was created Marquis de Casa Loring in 1856.

He founded the Bank of Málaga. He founded the newspaper El Correo de Andalucía and supported metal refining and lead smelting.

He lived in Madrid between 1873 and 1890, where he was Liberal MP and senator for many years.

== Legacy ==
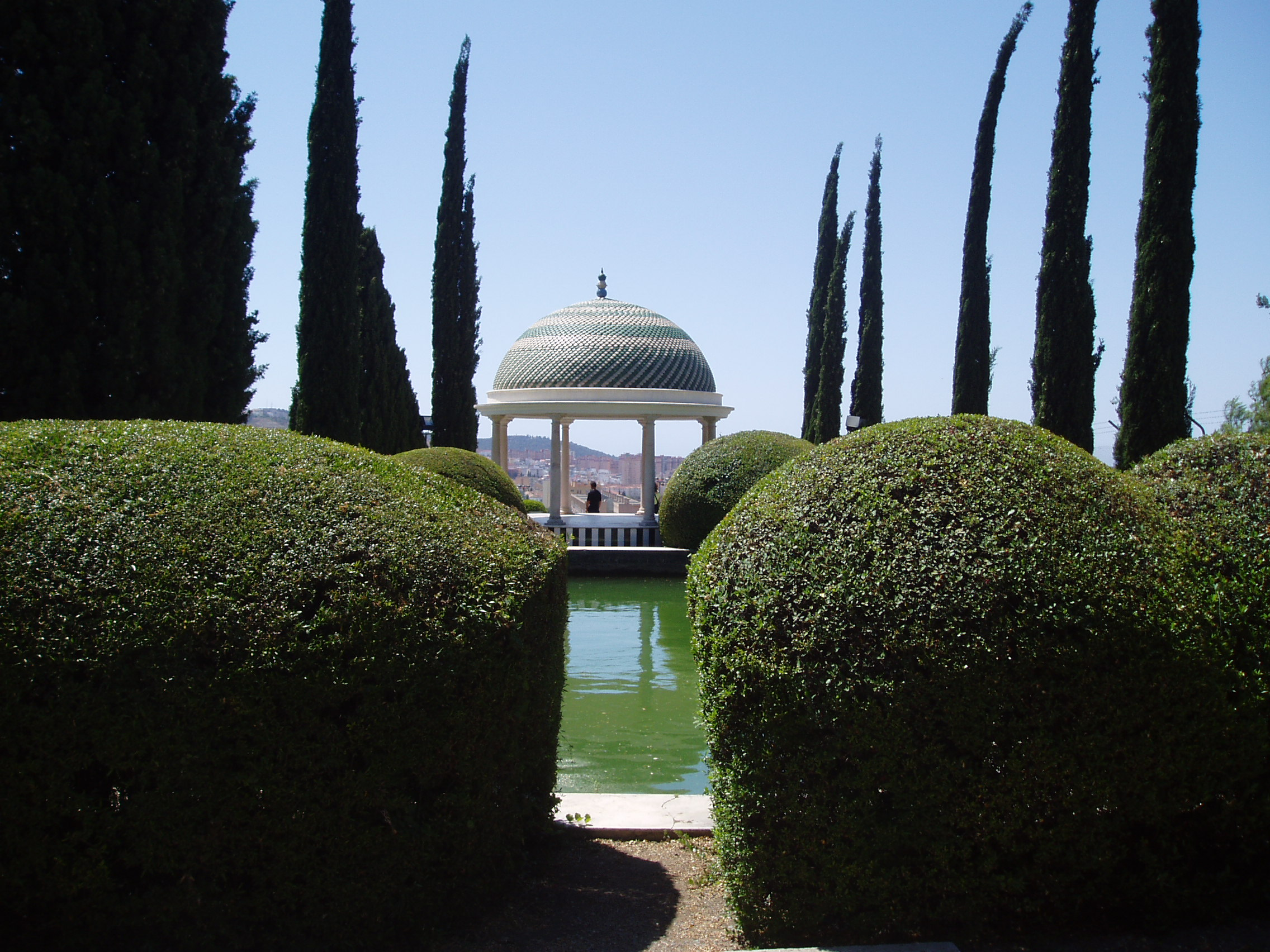
La Concepción Gardens

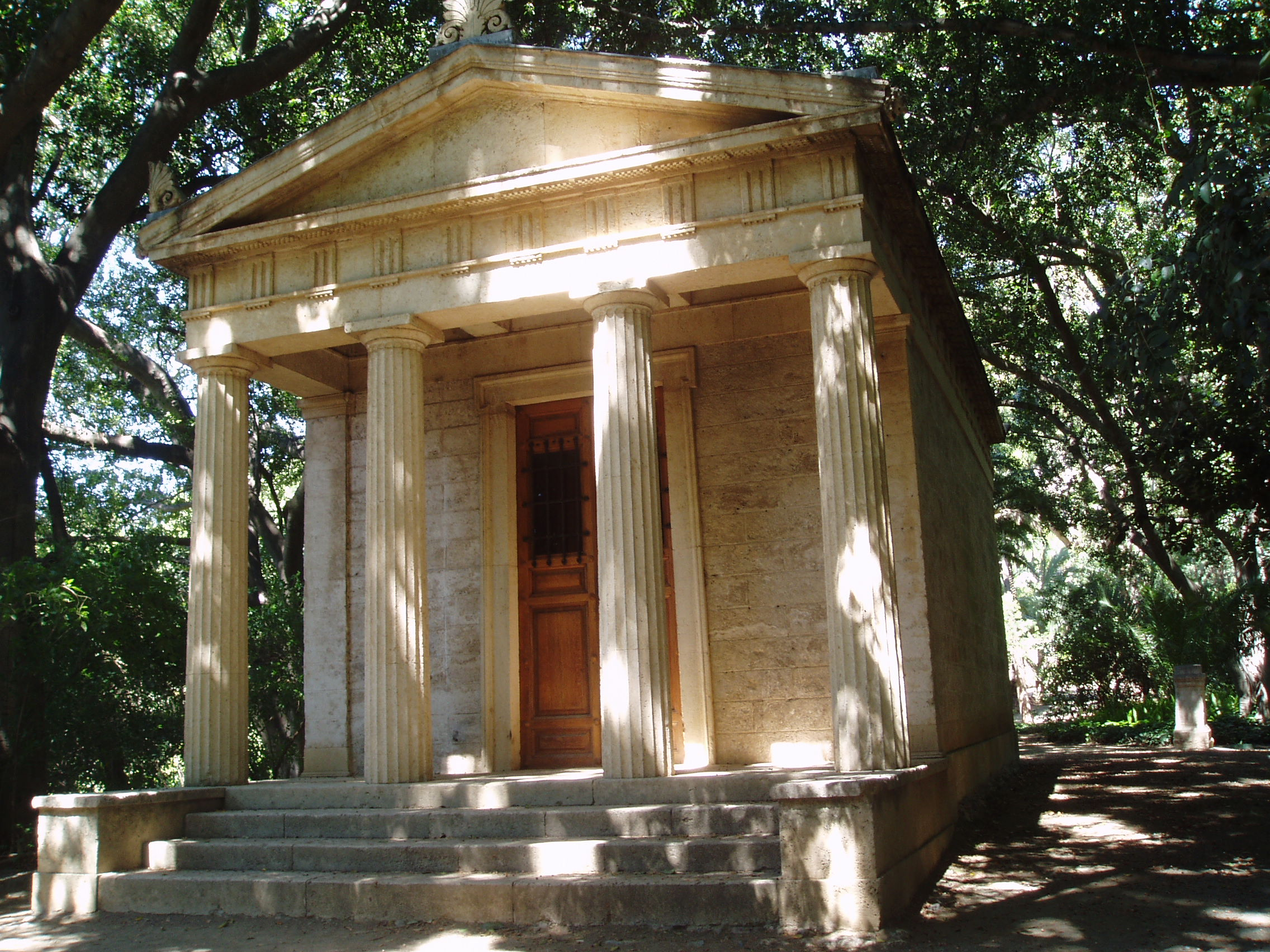
Loringiano Museum

Amalia Loring and her new husband created Málaga's La Concepción Gardens and named them after their youngest daughter. "La Concepción is one of the most beautiful and important tropical botanical gardens in Spain and one of the best in Europe." The garden was created at the Loring family farm.

In 1859 the Marquis opened the Loringiano Museum to hold an archeological collection he had started. It has now grown to be the present-day Museum of Málaga.

== See also ==
- List of Marqueses de Casa Loring
