= Apothecary to the Household =

Medical officer in the British Royal Household

The Apothecary to the Household is an officer of the Medical Household of the Royal Household of the Sovereign of the United Kingdom. He has a salaried daily surgery.

The Apothecary to the Household was originally responsible for providing medicine to members of the Royal Household; a separate officer, the Apothecary to the Person, ministered to the Sovereign. Both were appointed by warrant from the Lord Chamberlain, although the appointment was frequently published, in the form of letters patent under the Great Seal.

From the Restoration until 1727, a single Apothecary to the Household was appointed. For the next century, two or occasionally three individuals jointly held the office. The joint appointments came to an end on the resignation of Claudius du Pasquier in 1879. The original salary consisted of wages of £40 and board wages of £60, which had risen to a total of £160 and was fixed at £106 13s 4d during the reign of Queen Anne. During the earlier Stuart era, the Apothecary to the Household was also entitled to riding wages and sometimes lodging.

== List of Apothecaries to the Household ==
- 7 June 1660: George Solby
- 23 June 1660: Francis Metcalfe (held a grant in reversion from 1639; does not appear again)
- 20 March 1661: John Jones
- 20 September 1685: Charles Giffard
- 5 July 1686: John Jones (reappointed after Giffard's death)
- 14 February 1693: John Soames
- 31 March 1697: William Jones (obtained a reversion of the office on his father's death 7 June 1677; proved his claim against Soames)
- 17 March 1720 – 27 March 1727: Hugh Trimnell
- 14 April 1727 – bef. 1776: John Allen
- 1 December 1727 – 1738: Marmaduke Lilly
- 19 December 1738 – 11 April 1766: Benjamin Charlewood
- 16 January 1761 – bef. 1776: Michael Crane
- 16 August 1776 – bef. 1784: Robert Halifax
- 16 August 1776 – 1814: Edward Holdich
- 13 April 1814 – 29 January 1820: W. Alfred Jones
- 31 January 1820 – 11 October 1823: Richard Walker
- 31 January 1820 – 26 June 1830: John Nussey
- 1824 – bef. 1831: William Walker
- 24 July 1830 – 1858: Charles Craddock
- 8 August 1837 – 1862: John Nussey (reappointed)
- 23 February 1858 – 1 August 1879: Claudius Francis du Pasquier
- 23 July 1874: – 6 May 1910: Francis Laking
- vacant under George V?
- 21 July 1936 – 4 October 1949: Stanley Hewett
- 4 October 1949 – 1 October 1964: John Nigel Loring
- 1 October 1964 – 3 January 1975: Ralph Southward
- 3 January 1975 – 12 February 2003: Nigel Southward
- 2003–present: Timothy Evans
