= Jorge Loring Miró =

Spanish Roman Catholic priest (1921–2013)

Rev. Jorge Loring Miró, SJ (30 September 1921 – 25 December 2013) was a Spanish Jesuit, famed for his outreach and evangelism. He spent years performing on television, radio, lecturing around the world and writing books.

Loring Miró was born in 1921 in Barcelona, the son of Jorge Loring Martinez, a noted engineer. Jorge Loring Miró was ordained in 1954 when he was 33 years old. He wrote several books, the best known of which was Para salvarte (To Save You). Aside from his publications he has recorded some of his lectures on video, airing on EWTN.

He died of a stroke in Malaga, Spain, on 25 December 2013, aged 92.

== Works ==
- Para salvarte: Enciclopedia del católico (58ª edición), Edibesa; ISBN 84-85662-96-2 (1 de enero de 1975), 778 págs (1 January 1975), 778 pp.
- Testimodino Autores Católicos Escogidos; 55ª Edición
- Motivos Para Creer (30 de diciembre de 1999), Editorial Planeta, SA (Barcelona); ISBN 84-08-02021-8
- Los Evangelios. The Gospels. 2000 Dudas Resueltas, (October 2002), Planeta Pub Corp; ISBN 84-08-04467-2
- La Sábana Santa, dos mil años después (January 2003), Editorial Planeta
- Más de 200 respuestas a preguntas que usted se ha hecho sobre la fe, la moral y la doctrina católica (February 2010), Editorial Libros Libres; ISBN 978-84-96471-51-1
