= Thomas Loring =

American settler

Coat of Arms of Thomas Loring

Thomas Loring was an early settler of Hingham and Hull, Massachusetts. He was present at some of the key moments in the earliest history of Hingham, Massachusetts. But later "[t]he large Loring families were prominent in the town [of Hull], and remained into the 20th century." As early as 1893 he was recognized as "the progenitor of the families bearing this surname by birth in eastern Mass., and prob. throughout New Eng." His descendants include individuals on both sides of the American Revolution, the US Civil War, and today live across North America, Spain, England and Australia.

== Birth and family ==
"Deacon Thomas Loring was born in Axminster, Devonshire, England. ... "Thomas Loring married, in England, Jane Newton; Her grandson ... says "she was a woman of a lively spirit ... skilled in the practise of physick"....

== Immigration to Massachusetts Bay and settlement in Hingham ==
"Mr. Loring came here (New England) ... "December 23, 1634," and joined the church colony at Hingham .... Admitted "freeman" or citizen of the colony March 3, 1635-6, he was already established on a home lot near what is now [1917] the corner of Town and Ship Streets. He became the proprietor of other lots at later times.

== Farming, weir, innkeeper ==
"He was a farmer. As the fish that abounded along the shore furnished a large part of the food of the inhabitants, and were also "set" with the corn to enrich the soil, Deacon Loring and his neighbours, by permission of the town in 1637, built a weir to catch this floating wealth; and the stream is called today Weir River. He was an innkeeper, too, perhaps the first in the plantation, licensed by the General Court along with some other towns in March, 1637. ... "The church chose him one of its deacons ....

== Significant role in the early history of Hingham, Massachusetts ==
Hingham "... reached full maturity when on 12 March 1637/8 Thomas Loring was 'allowed to sell wine & strong water'" as part of his role as innkeeper. "Our first solid evidence that the church had been formed is the list of freemen of 3 March 1635/6, where we find a grouping of eleven men who were known to be residents of Hingham: [including]...Thomas Loring...[MBCR 1:371] . The church was founded, then, no later than 3 March 1635/6..."

Loring was one of those named in an 1828 inscription on the former "Great Rock" above Hingham which celebrated early settlers:

"When wild in wood the naked savage ran,
Lazell, Low, Loring, Lane, Lewis, Lincoln,
Hersey, Leavitt, Jacobs, King, Jones and Sprague,
Stemmed the wild torrent of a barbarous age,
And were the first invaders of this country,
From the Island of Great Britain, in 1635."

== Move to Hull, Massachusetts ==
"From some cause fire robbed him of his dwelling, March 15, 1645-6, and he chose not to rebuild. Instead, however, he bought property in the adjoining plantation of Hull, and took a prominent place there; was constable (which then meant court officer, tax collector, etc., and demanded a good business education as well as efficiency). "He joined with some of his neighbours and others in taking stock in a new plantation, "Sickonke", afterwards called Seakonk and Rehoboth; but he did not remove to the place or continue his ownership of land there.

"On 10 April 1656, Nauhawton of Puncepaug in Dorchester sold the same 'neck of land called Nantascot, but now called the Town of Hull to Thomas Loring...and the rest of the inhabitants of the town...'"

== Estate ==
"He bought "for a valuable consideration," May 30, 1660, of Thomas Chaffee "all that my house Housing orchard & two home lotts, lying in the town of Hull, Conteigning fower acres more or lesse as they were measured lying North East & South west John Loring on the South east William Chamberlaine on the North west the Towne streete on the South west & Ducke Lane on the North East with my lott of meadow by Streights River & my two lotts at Sagamore hill and my two lotts at Strawbery hill as they stand recorded to be butted & bounded in the Towne book of Hull aforesaid except one Cowes Comon formerly sold to William Chamberlaine with all my right interest & priviledges [sic] in all the Islands belonging to the towne of Hull aforesaid except on the island called Peddocks Island." "This extensive property was the subject of careful appraisal and division by the sons after their father's decease.

== House still standing ==
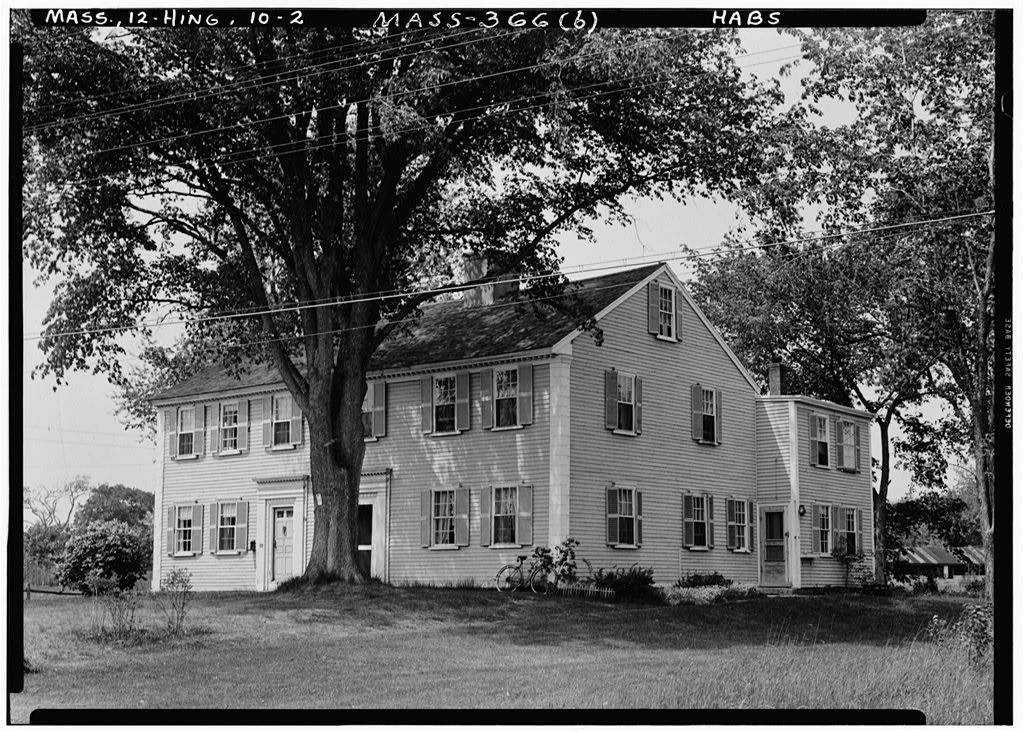
Grandson Thomas Loring (1661/2 - 1738), saddler, selectman, and representative to the General Court, built half this house, and great grandson Captain Benjamin Loring (1692-1764) built the other half. This does not include a rear portion probably added by great great grandson Thomas Loring (1719-1788)

"When his son John married in 1657 Thomas bought for him the land of Ralph Greene on Further Hill, between Thomas Chaffee and Thomas Collier, where, on Town (now Spring ) Street, the landmark ancient cape-style home is still standing."

== Decease ==
"Deacon Loring died April 4, 1661, leaving no will. ... the required inventory was presented June 27, 1661. The document ... shows [his] style of life ...."

== Descendants ==
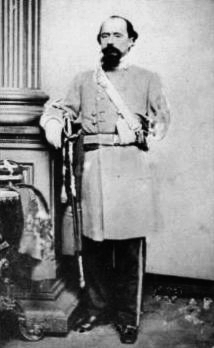
CSA General William W Loring

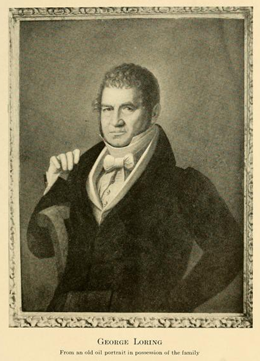
Successful Massachusetts merchant George Loring after he had moved to Málaga, Spain. He was the father of the first Marquis de Casa Loring

The Loring family "is the only one of the original [Hull] families to represent Hull in both the Revolutionary and the Civil Wars." Thomas' descendants were found on both sides of the American Revolution, including Loyalist Commodore Joshua Loring, and on both sides of the American Civil war including confederate general William W. Loring. Joshua's descendants included an Apothecary to Queen Elizabeth the Queen Mother, Sir. John Nigel Loring. Descendants and double cousins Edward Greeley Loring and Charles Greeley Loring were on opposite sides of litigation over the fugitive slave act. Colonel Benjamin Loring, commander in 1818 of the Ancient and Honorable Artillery Company of Massachusetts gave his name to Loring Hall, built in 1835 and serving into the twenty-first century as the town of Hingham's movie theater. Literary descendants include fifth great grandson Frederick Wadsworth Loring, a promising writer. A branch of the family were successful merchants in Spain and included an aviation pioneer Jorge Loring Martinez, and the Marquis de Casa Loring whose present-day incumbent is a descendant of Thomas Loring.
