= List of Marqueses de Casa Loring =

The Marquis de Casa Loring is a title in Spanish nobility for persons who possess the legal status of hereditary nobility according to the laws and traditions of the Spanish monarchy. It was created in 1856 for George Henry Loring after he and his family used their wealth to pay for the care of the poor of Málaga, Spain, during a cholera outbreak. The first Marquis was a dual citizen of Spain and the United States and a son of a successful cross- Atlantic trader and merchant whose family in turn were descended from an early resident of Hingham and Hull, Massachusetts, Deacon Thomas Loring.

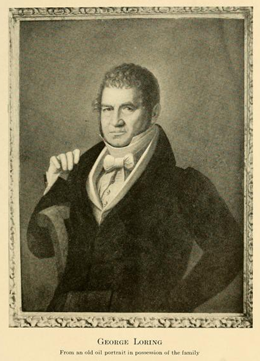
Successful Massachusetts merchant George Loring after he had moved to Málaga, Spain. He was the father of the first Marquis de Casa Loring

George Loring (1771–1843), a New England-born merchant and descendant of the New England Deacon Thomas Loring family, moved to Málaga, Spain where he married and their descendants continue today. One of his sons, known as George Henry Loring in New England and Jorge Loring Y Oyarzábal in Spain, was created a Spanish Marquis in 1856. The present holder of the title is the seventh Loring descendant to do so.

1) Jorge Loring Y Oyarzábal, 1st Marques de Casa Loring (Wikipedia & Loring Gen)

2) Jorge Loring y Heredia, 2. Marqués de Casa Loring (son of Jorge Loring y Oyarzábal) (Wikipedia & Loring Gen)

3) Julia Loring Heredia, Marquesa de Casa Loring (daughter of Jorge Loring y Heredia)

4) Ricardo Gross Loring, Marqués de Casa Loring (son of Julia Loring Heredia)(he had no children?)

5) Julia Gross y Loring, Marquesa de Casa Loring (daughter of Julia Loring Heredia) + Málaga 13.03.1994

6) José Carlos Alvarez de Toledo y Gross (Málaga, 7 November 1929 – Madrid, 19 March 2000), 6th Marquess of Casa Loring, 8th Count of Villapaterna (son of Julia Gross y Loring)

7) Vittoria Eugenia Alvarez de Toledo y Marone-Cinzano (b. Málaga, 8 October 1961), 7th Marchioness of Casa Loring, married in Madrid on 29 September 1982 Alfonso Codorníu y Aguilar (b. Madrid, 24 April 1954), (daughter of Jose Carlos) and had issue: Jaime Codorníu y Alvarez de Toledo (b. Madrid, 16 February 1985) Ana Codorníu y Alvarez de Toledo (b. Madrid, 24 January 1987) Carla Codorníu y Alvarez de Toledo (b. Madrid, 5 July 1990)
