= List of finance ministers of Spain =

This is a list of ministers of finance or treasury of Spain.

== Introduction ==
Before 1705, it existed the position of Superintendent General of Finance. It wasn't exactly a finance minister, as there were other superintendents general, but while the former had a general role, the others administered specific taxes (tobacco, salt, mail, etc.).

Under the first Bourbons, the superintendent general had to coexist with other finance positions, such as the Veedor General or the Universal Intendant, but from 1720 the Secretary of Finance was, at the same time, the Superintendent General of Finance. This last position fell into disuse in the 19th century.

In recent times, there has been the position of Minister of Economy which, occasionally, has been merged with that of Minister of Finance (from 1937 to 1939, from 1982 to 2000 and from 2004 to 2011).

== List of ministers ==
| Name | Start | End | Duration | Party | Government | | Ref. |
|---|---|---|---|---|---|---|---|
| Superintendent General of Finance | | | | | Manuel Francisco de Lira Castillo (Note: The "strong man" at court during the last years of the reign of Charles II was Manuel Joaquín Álvarez de Toledo, Count of Oropesa.) | Charles II (1665–1700) | |
| The Marquess of Vélez (1635–1693) | 31 January 1687 | 20 September 1693 | 6 years, 232 days | Non-partisan | Manuel Francisco de Lira Castillo | Charles II (1665–1700) | |
| The Marquess of Vélez (1635–1693) | 31 January 1687 | 20 September 1693 | 6 years, 232 days | Non-partisan | Juan de Angulo | Charles II (1665–1700) | |
| The Count of Adanero (1641–1699) | 16 December 1695 | 19 March 1699† | 3 years, 93 days | Non-partisan | Juan de Larrea Ortiz de Zárate | Charles II (1665–1700) | |
| The Count of Adanero (1641–1699) | 16 December 1695 | 19 March 1699† | 3 years, 93 days | Non-partisan | Juan Antonio López de Zárate | Charles II (1665–1700) | |
| The Count of Adanero (1641–1699) | 16 December 1695 | 19 March 1699† | 3 years, 93 days | Non-partisan | Antonio de Ubilla | Charles II (1665–1700) | |
| The Duke of Veragua (1651–1710) | 6 September 1706 | 9 September 1710† (Note: This is a conjecture. As José Luis Bermejo Cabrero recounts in his work "Financial Organization from the Habsburgs to the Bourbons: Councils, Boards and Superintendencies" (pages 237–238), there is not enough documentation to conclude when he left office, but it is known that he was still in office in June 1709, a year before his death.) | 4 years, 3 days | Non-partisan | The Marquess of Mejorada del Campo | Philip V (1700–1724) | |
| Secretary of State and of the Office of War and Finance | | | | | The Marquess of Mejorada del Campo | Philip V (1700–1724) | |
| The Marquess of Grimaldo (1664–1773) | 11 July 1705 | 30 November 1714 | 9 years, 142 days | Non-partisan | The Marquess of Mejorada del Campo | Philip V (1700–1724) | |
| Veedor General of Finance | | | | | The Marquess of Grimaldo (Note: From 1714 to 1715 the "strong man" at court was Jean Orry, Veedor General of Finance and, from 1715 to 1719, Giulio Alberoni, Ambassador of Parma.) | Philip V (1700–1724) | |
| Jean Orry (1652–1719) | 30 November 1714 | 7 February 1715 | 69 days | Non-partisan | The Marquess of Grimaldo | Philip V (1700–1724) | |
| Universal Intendant of Finance | | | | | The Marquess of Grimaldo | Philip V (1700–1724) | |
| The Bishop of Gironda (1633–1730) | 30 November 1714 | 2 April 1717 | 2 years, 123 days | Non-partisan | The Marquess of Grimaldo | Philip V (1700–1724) | |
| Secretary of State and of the Office of Justice, Political Government and Finance | | | | | The Marquess of Grimaldo | Philip V (1700–1724) | |
| The Marquess of the Compuesta (1668–1741) | 2 April 1717 | 1 December 1720 | 3 years, 243 days | Non-partisan | The Marquess of Grimaldo | Philip V (1700–1724) | |
| Secretary of State and of the Office of Finance | | | | | The Marquess of Grimaldo | Philip V (1700–1724) | |
| The Marquess of Campoflorido (1667–1726) | 1 December 1720 | 10 January 1724 | 3 years, 40 days | Non-partisan | The Marquess of Grimaldo | Philip V (1700–1724) | |
| Fernando Verdes Montenegro (1682–1741) | 10 January 1724 | 4 September 1724 | 238 days | Non-partisan | The Marquess of the Peace | Louis I (1724) | |
| The Marquess of the Peace (1683–1734) | 4 September 1724 | 14 May 1726 | 1 year, 252 days | Non-partisan | The Marquess of Grimaldo (Note: Between 1725 and 1726, the "strong man" at court was The Baron Ripperda, who held the position of Secretary of State and of the Office without portfolio, as a favorite.) | Philip V (1724–1746) | |
| Francisco Arriaza y Medina (1669–1739) | 14 May 1726 | 29 September 1726 | 138 days | Non-partisan | The Marquess of Grimaldo | Philip V (1724–1746) | |
| José Patiño (1670–1736) | 29 September 1726 | 3 November 1736† | 10 years, 35 days | Non-partisan | The Marquess of the Peace | Philip V (1724–1746) | |
| José Patiño (1670–1736) | 29 September 1726 | 3 November 1736† | 10 years, 35 days | Non-partisan | José Patiño | Philip V (1724–1746) | |
| The Marquess of Torrenueva (1681–1747) | 23 November 1736 | 7 March 1739 | 2 years, 104 days | Non-partisan | The Marquess of Villarías (Note: In practice, the "strong man" at court since 1743 was The Marquess of Ensenada, secretary of finance.) | Philip V (1724–1746) | |
| The Marquess of Murillo de Cuende (1674–1741) | 10 March 1739 | 8 September 1740 | 1 year, 182 days | Non-partisan | The Marquess of Villarías | Philip V (1724–1746) | |
| Fernando Verdes Montenegro (1682–1741) | 8 September 1740 | 27 February 1741 | 172 days | Non-partisan | The Marquess of Villarías | Philip V (1724–1746) | |
| José del Campillo (1693–1743) | 27 February 1741 | 11 April 1743† | 2 years, 43 days | Independent | The Marquess of Villarías | Philip V (1724–1746) | |
| The Marquess of Ensenada (1702–1781) | 23 April 1743 | 21 July 1754 | 11 years, 89 days | Non-partisan | The Marquess of Villarías | Philip V (1724–1746) | |
| The Marquess of Ensenada (1702–1781) | 23 April 1743 | 21 July 1754 | 11 years, 89 days | Non-partisan | José de Carvajal y Lancáster | Philip V (1724–1746) | |
| The Marquess of Ensenada (1702–1781) | 23 April 1743 | 21 July 1754 | 11 years, 89 days | Non-partisan | José de Carvajal y Lancáster | Ferdinand VI (1746–1759) | |
| The Marquess of Ensenada (1702–1781) | 23 April 1743 | 21 July 1754 | 11 years, 89 days | Non-partisan | The Duke of Alba | Ferdinand VI (1746–1759) | |
| The Marquess of Ensenada (1702–1781) | 23 April 1743 | 21 July 1754 | 11 years, 89 days | Non-partisan | Ricardo Wall | Ferdinand VI (1746–1759) | |
| The Count of Valparaíso (1696–1760) | 21 July 1754 | 8 December 1759 | 5 years, 140 days | Non-partisan | Ricardo Wall | Charles III (1759–1788) | |
| The Marquess of Esquilache (1699–1785) | 8 December 1759 | 24 March 1766 | 6 years, 106 days | Non-partisan | Ricardo Wall | Charles III (1759–1788) | |
| The Marquess of Esquilache (1699–1785) | 8 December 1759 | 24 March 1766 | 6 years, 106 days | Non-partisan | The Duke of Grimaldi | Charles III (1759–1788) | |
| The Count of Gausa (1719–1785) | 27 March 1766 | 21 January 1785† | 18 years, 300 days | Non-partisan | The Duke of Grimaldi | Charles III (1759–1788) | |
| The Count of Gausa (1719–1785) | 27 March 1766 | 21 January 1785† | 18 years, 300 days | Non-partisan | The Count of Floridablanca | Charles III (1759–1788) | |
| The Count of Lerena (1734–1792) | 25 January 1785 | 2 January 1792 | 6 years, 342 days | Non-partisan | The Count of Floridablanca | Charles III (1759–1788) | |
| The Count of Lerena (1734–1792) | 25 January 1785 | 2 January 1792 | 6 years, 342 days | Non-partisan | The Count of Floridablanca | Charles IV (1788–1808) | |
| Diego de Gardoqui (Note: Gardoquí, Director of Trade, served as acting minister from 16 October 1791, due to the illness of his predecessor, until his confirmation on 25 March 1792.) (1735–1798) | 25 March 1792 | 21 October 1796 | 4 years, 210 days | Non-partisan | The Count of Floridablanca | Charles IV (1788–1808) | |
| Diego de Gardoqui (1735–1798) | 25 March 1792 | 21 October 1796 | 4 years, 210 days | Non-partisan | The Count of Aranda (Note: Although he worked with some independence, by this time Manuel Godoy, Prince of the Peace, already controlled the court.) | Charles IV (1788–1808) | |
| Diego de Gardoqui (1735–1798) | 25 March 1792 | 21 October 1796 | 4 years, 210 days | Non-partisan | The Prince of the Peace | Charles IV (1788–1808) | |
| Pedro de Varela Ulloa (1737–1797) | 21 October 1796 | 10 June 1797† | 232 days | Non-partisan | The Prince of the Peace | Charles IV (1788–1808) | |
| The Marquess of Hormazas (1747–1825) | 10 June 1797 | 21 November 1797 | 164 days | Non-partisan | The Prince of the Peace | Charles IV (1788–1808) | |
| Francisco de Saavedra (1746–1819) | 21 November 1797 | 6 September 1798 | 289 days | Non-partisan | The Prince of the Peace | Charles IV (1788–1808) | |
| Francisco de Saavedra (1746–1819) | 21 November 1797 | 6 September 1798 | 289 days | Non-partisan | Francisco de Saavedra (Note: He did not have an effective government. It was heavily influenced by his predecessor, and his ongoing health problems prevented him from exercise the office.) | Charles IV (1788–1808) | |
| Miguel Cayetano Soler Rabassa (1746–1808) | 6 September 1798 | 29 March 1808 | 9 years, 205 days | Non-partisan | Francisco de Saavedra | Charles IV (1788–1808) | |
| Miguel Cayetano Soler Rabassa (1746–1808) | 6 September 1798 | 29 March 1808 | 9 years, 205 days | Non-partisan | Mariano Luis de Urquijo | Charles IV (1788–1808) | |
| Miguel Cayetano Soler Rabassa (1746–1808) | 6 September 1798 | 29 March 1808 | 9 years, 205 days | Non-partisan | Pedro Cevallos (Note: In practice, the government was run by Manuel Godoy.) | Charles IV (1788–1808) | |
| Miguel Cayetano Soler Rabassa (1746–1808) | 6 September 1798 | 29 March 1808 | 9 years, 205 days | Non-partisan | Pedro Cevallos | Ferdinand VII (1808–1833) | |
| Miguel José de Azanza (1746–1826) | 29 March 1808 | 7 July 1808 | 100 days | Non-partisan | Pedro Cevallos | Ferdinand VII (1808–1833) | |
Reign of Joseph Bonaparte
| The Count of Cabarrús (1752–1810) | 7 July 1808 | 27 April 1810† | 1 year, 294 days | Non-partisan | Mariano Luis de Urquijo | Joseph Bonaparte (1808–1813) | |
| José Martínez de Hervás (1760–1830) acting minister | 27 April 1810 | 7 August 1810 | 102 days | Non-partisan | Mariano Luis de Urquijo | Joseph Bonaparte (1808–1813) | |
| Gonzalo O'Farril (1754–1831) acting minister | 7 August 1810 | 31 August 1810 | 24 days | Non-partisan | Mariano Luis de Urquijo | Joseph Bonaparte (1808–1813) | |
| Francisco Angulo (1756–1815) | 31 August 1810 | 27 June 1813 | 2 years, 324 days | Non-partisan | Mariano Luis de Urquijo | Joseph Bonaparte (1808–1813) | |
Supreme Central Junta — Regency in the name of Ferdinand VII; Abdication of Ferdinand VII declared null and void by the Council of Castile on August 11, 1808 and recognition of him as king on August 24 of the same year.
| Francisco de Saavedra (1746–1819) | 15 October 1808 | 30 October 1809 | 1 year, 15 days | Non-partisan | Pedro Cevallos | Ferdinand VII (1808–1833) | |
| Francisco de Saavedra (1746–1819) | 15 October 1808 | 30 October 1809 | 1 year, 15 days | Non-partisan | Martín de Garay | Ferdinand VII (1808–1833) | |
| Francisco de Saavedra (1746–1819) | 15 October 1808 | 30 October 1809 | 1 year, 15 days | Non-partisan | Pedro de Rivero | Ferdinand VII (1808–1833) | |
| The Marquess of Hormazas (1747–1825) acting minister | 2 November 1809 | 2 July 1810 | 242 days | Non-partisan | Francisco de Saavedra | Ferdinand VII (1808–1833) | |
| The Marquess of Hormazas (1747–1825) acting minister | 2 November 1809 | 2 July 1810 | 242 days | Non-partisan | The Marquess of Hormazas | Ferdinand VII (1808–1833) | |
| The Marquess of Hormazas (1747–1825) acting minister | 2 November 1809 | 2 July 1810 | 242 days | Non-partisan | Eusebio Bardají y Azara | Ferdinand VII (1808–1833) | |
| Nicolás María Sierra (1750–1817) acting minister | 2 July 1810 | 13 November 1810 | 134 days | Non-partisan | Eusebio Bardají y Azara | Ferdinand VII (1808–1833) | |
| José Company (1772–1824) acting minister | 13 November 1810 | 14 January 1811 | 62 days | Non-partisan | Eusebio Bardají y Azara | Ferdinand VII (1808–1833) | |
| José Canga Argüelles (1770–1843) acting minister | 14 January 1811 | 6 February 1812 | 1 year, 23 days | Non-partisan | Eusebio Bardají y Azara | Ferdinand VII (1808–1833) | |
| Antonio Ranz Romanillos (1759–1830) acting minister | 6 February 1812 | 22 April 1812 | 76 days | Non-partisan | José García de León y Pizarro | Ferdinand VII (1808–1833) | |
| José Vázquez de Figueroa (1770–1855) acting minister | 22 April 1812 | 23 June 1812 | 62 days | Non-partisan | José García de León y Pizarro | Ferdinand VII (1808–1833) | |
| José Vázquez de Figueroa (1770–1855) acting minister | 22 April 1812 | 23 June 1812 | 62 days | Non-partisan | Ignacio de la Pezuela | Ferdinand VII (1808–1833) | |
| Luis María Salazar y Salazar (1758–1838) | 23 June 1812 | 1 October 1812 | 100 days | Non-partisan | The Marquess of Casa Irujo | Ferdinand VII (1808–1833) | |
| Cristóbal Góngora Fernández Delgado (1757–1822) | 1 October 1812 | 30 March 1813 | 180 days | Non-partisan | The Marquess of Casa Irujo | Ferdinand VII (1808–1833) | |
| Cristóbal Góngora Fernández Delgado (1757–1822) | 1 October 1812 | 30 March 1813 | 180 days | Non-partisan | The Marquess of Labrador | Ferdinand VII (1808–1833) | |
| Tomás José González-Carvajal (1753–1834) | 30 March 1813 | 24 August 1813 | 147 days | Non-partisan | The Marquess of Labrador | Ferdinand VII (1808–1833) | |
| Tomás José González-Carvajal (1753–1834) | 30 March 1813 | 24 August 1813 | 147 days | Non-partisan | Antonio Cano Ramírez de Arellano | Ferdinand VII (1808–1833) | |
| Julián Fernández de Navarrete y Jiménez de Tejada (1767–1820) acting minister | 24 August 1813 | 4 May 1814 | 253 days | Non-partisan | Antonio Cano Ramírez de Arellano | Ferdinand VII (1808–1833) | |
| Julián Fernández de Navarrete y Jiménez de Tejada (1767–1820) acting minister | 24 August 1813 | 4 May 1814 | 253 days | Non-partisan | Juan O'Donojú | Ferdinand VII (1808–1833) | |
| Julián Fernández de Navarrete y Jiménez de Tejada (1767–1820) acting minister | 24 August 1813 | 4 May 1814 | 253 days | Non-partisan | José Luyando | Ferdinand VII (1808–1833) | |
Abolition of the Constitution of 1812
| Luis María Salazar y Salazar (1758–1838) | 4 May 1814 | 29 May 1814 | 25 days | Non-partisan | The Duke of San Carlos | Ferdinand VII (1808–1833) | |
| Cristóbal Góngora Fernández Delgado (1757–1822) | 29 May 1814 | 23 September 1814 | 117 days | Non-partisan | The Duke of San Carlos | Ferdinand VII (1808–1833) | |
| Juan Pérez Villamil (1754–1824) acting minister | 23 September 1814 | 2 February 1815 | 132 days | Non-partisan | The Duke of San Carlos | Ferdinand VII (1808–1833) | |
| Juan Pérez Villamil (1754–1824) acting minister | 23 September 1814 | 2 February 1815 | 132 days | Non-partisan | Pedro Cevallos | Ferdinand VII (1808–1833) | |
| Felipe González Vallejo (1769–1824) | 2 February 1815 | 10 December 1815 | 311 days | Non-partisan | Pedro Cevallos | Ferdinand VII (1808–1833) | |
| José Andrés Ibarra Mateo (1753–1818) | 10 December 1815 | 27 January 1816 | 48 days | Non-partisan | Pedro Cevallos | Ferdinand VII (1808–1833) | |
| Manuel López Araujo (1759–1824) | 27 January 1816 | 23 December 1816 | 331 days | Non-partisan | Pedro Cevallos | Ferdinand VII (1808–1833) | |
| Manuel López Araujo (1759–1824) | 27 January 1816 | 23 December 1816 | 331 days | Non-partisan | José García de León y Pizarro | Ferdinand VII (1808–1833) | |
| Martín de Garay (1771–1822) | 23 December 1816 | 14 September 1818 | 1 year, 265 days | Non-partisan | José García de León y Pizarro | Ferdinand VII (1808–1833) | |
| José Imaz (1761–1828) | 14 September 1818 | 3 November 1819 | 1 year, 50 days | Non-partisan | The Marquess of Casa Irujo | Ferdinand VII (1808–1833) | |
| Antonio González Salmón (1768–1834) | 3 November 1819 | 22 March 1820 | 140 days | Non-partisan | Manuel González Salmón | Ferdinand VII (1808–1833) | |
| Antonio González Salmón (1768–1834) | 3 November 1819 | 22 March 1820 | 140 days | Non-partisan | The Duke of San Fernando de Quiroga | Ferdinand VII (1808–1833) | |
Start of the Trienio Liberal
| José Canga Argüelles (1770–1843) | 22 March 1820 | 2 March 1821 | 345 days | Non-partisan | Evaristo Pérez de Castro | Ferdinand VII (1808–1833) | |
| Luis Sorela Carcaño (Note: He was appointed as acting minister, but never took office. Juan Ángel Caamaño served during this time.) (1784–1847) acting minister | 2 March 1821 | 4 March 1821 | 2 days | Non-partisan | Joaquín Anduaga Cuenca | Ferdinand VII (1808–1833) | |
| Antonio Barata Matas (1772–1850) | 4 March 1821 | 31 October 1821 | 241 days | Non-partisan | Eusebio Bardají y Azara | Ferdinand VII (1808–1833) | |
| Ángel Vallejo Villalón (1778–1840) acting minister | 31 October 1821 | 8 January 1822 | 69 days | Non-partisan | Eusebio Bardají y Azara | Ferdinand VII (1808–1833) | |
| José Imaz (1761–1828) acting minister | 8 January 1822 | 11 January 1822 | 3 days | Non-partisan | Ramón López-Pelegrín | Ferdinand VII (1808–1833) | |
| Luis Sorela Carcaño (1784–1847) acting minister | 11 January 1822 | 24 January 1822 | 13 days | Non-partisan | Ramón López-Pelegrín | Ferdinand VII (1808–1833) | |
| Luis López Ballesteros (1782–1853) | 24 January 1822 | 30 January 1822 | 6 days | Non-partisan | The Marquess of Santa Cruz | Ferdinand VII (1808–1833) | |
| Luis Sorela Carcaño (1784–1847) acting minister | 30 January 1822 | 28 February 1822 | 29 days | Non-partisan | Ramón López-Pelegrín | Ferdinand VII (1808–1833) | |
| Felipe Sierra Pambley (1774–1823) | 28 February 1822 | 5 August 1822 | 158 days | Non-partisan | Francisco Martínez de la Rosa | Ferdinand VII (1808–1833) | |
| Antonio Martínez Martínez (1770–1854) | 5 August 1822 | 6 August 1822 | 1 day | Non-partisan | The Duke of San Miguel | Ferdinand VII (1808–1833) | |
| Mariano Egea Gallar (1777–1841) acting minister | 6 August 1822 | 28 April 1823 | 265 days | Non-partisan | The Duke of San Miguel | Ferdinand VII (1808–1833) | |
| Manuel Cortés Aragón (1782–1845) acting minister | 28 April 1823 | 13 May 1823 | 15 days | Non-partisan | José Manuel de Vadillo | Ferdinand VII (1808–1833) | |
| Manuel Cortés Aragón (1782–1845) acting minister | 28 April 1823 | 13 May 1823 | 15 days | Non-partisan | Santiago Usoz y Mozi | Ferdinand VII (1808–1833) | |
| Juan Antonio Yandiola Garay (1786–1830) | 13 May 1823 | 30 September 1823 | 140 days | Non-partisan | José María Pando | Ferdinand VII (1808–1833) | |
| Juan Antonio Yandiola Garay (1786–1830) | 13 May 1823 | 30 September 1823 | 140 days | Non-partisan | Juan Antonio Yandiola Garay | Ferdinand VII (1808–1833) | |
| Juan Antonio Yandiola Garay (1786–1830) | 13 May 1823 | 30 September 1823 | 140 days | Non-partisan | José Luyando | Ferdinand VII (1808–1833) | |
End of the Trienio Liberal
| Juan Bautista Erro (1773–1854) | 26 May 1823 | 2 December 1823 | 190 days | Non-partisan | Víctor Damián Sáez (Note: Antonio Vargas Laguna, 1st Marquess of the Constancia, was the de iure prime minister until August 7, 1823, but he was abroad negotiating with foreign powers, so he never took office.) | Ferdinand VII (1808–1833) | |
| Luis López Ballesteros (1782–1853) | 2 December 1823 | 1 October 1832 | 8 years, 304 days | Non-partisan | The Marquess of Casa Irujo | Ferdinand VII (1808–1833) | |
| Luis López Ballesteros (1782–1853) | 2 December 1823 | 1 October 1832 | 8 years, 304 days | Non-partisan | The Marquess of Heredia | Ferdinand VII (1808–1833) | |
| Luis López Ballesteros (1782–1853) | 2 December 1823 | 1 October 1832 | 8 years, 304 days | Non-partisan | Francisco Cea Bermúdez | Ferdinand VII (1808–1833) | |
| Luis López Ballesteros (1782–1853) | 2 December 1823 | 1 October 1832 | 8 years, 304 days | Non-partisan | The Duke of the Infantado | Ferdinand VII (1808–1833) | |
| Luis López Ballesteros (1782–1853) | 2 December 1823 | 1 October 1832 | 8 years, 304 days | Non-partisan | Manuel González Salmón | Ferdinand VII (1808–1833) | |
| Luis López Ballesteros (1782–1853) | 2 December 1823 | 1 October 1832 | 8 years, 304 days | Non-partisan | The Count of Alcudia | Ferdinand VII (1808–1833) | |
| Victoriano de Encima (1766–1840) | 1 October 1832 | 25 March 1833 | 175 days | Non-partisan | Francisco Cea Bermúdez | Ferdinand VII (1808–1833) | |
| Antonio Martínez Martínez (1770–1854) | 25 March 1833 | 27 December 1833 | 277 days | Non-partisan | Francisco Cea Bermúdez | Ferdinand VII (1808–1833) | |
| Antonio Martínez Martínez (1770–1854) | 25 March 1833 | 27 December 1833 | 277 days | Non-partisan | Francisco Cea Bermúdez | Isabella II (1833–1868) | |
| Javier de Burgos (1778–1848) acting minister | 27 December 1833 | 15 January 1834 | 19 days | Non-partisan | Francisco Cea Bermúdez | Isabella II (1833–1868) | |
| José Aranalde Gorbieta (1792–1855) | 15 January 1834 | 7 February 1834 | 23 days | Moderate | Francisco Martínez de la Rosa | Isabella II (1833–1868) | |
| José Imaz (1761–1828) acting minister | 7 February 1834 | 18 June 1834 | 131 days | Moderate | Francisco Martínez de la Rosa | Isabella II (1833–1868) | |
| The Count of Toreno (1786–1843) | 18 June 1834 | 13 June 1835 | 360 days | Moderate | Francisco Martínez de la Rosa | Isabella II (1833–1868) | |
| The Count of Toreno (1786–1843) | 18 June 1834 | 13 June 1835 | 360 days | Moderate | The Count of Toreno | Isabella II (1833–1868) | |
| Juan Álvarez Mendizábal (1790–1853) | 13 June 1835 | 15 May 1836 | 337 days | Progressive | The Count of Toreno | Isabella II (1833–1868) | |
| Juan Álvarez Mendizábal (1790–1853) | 13 June 1835 | 15 May 1836 | 337 days | Progressive | Miguel Ricardo de Álava (Note: Acting during the absences of the Minister: Julián Villalba (14–17 September 1835) and Juan Álvarez Mendizábal (17–25 September).) | Isabella II (1833–1868) | |
| Juan Álvarez Mendizábal (1790–1853) | 13 June 1835 | 15 May 1836 | 337 days | Progressive | Juan Álvarez Mendizábal (acting) | Isabella II (1833–1868) | |
| José Ventura de Aguirre-Solarte Iturraspe (Note: He never took office. During his term, Mariano Egea, Honorary Councillor of State and Director-General in the Ministry of Finance (17 to 25 May 1836) and Félix d'Olhaberriague Blanco, Director-General in the Ministry of Finance (May 25 to August 14, 1836), served as acting ministers.) (1793–1842) | 15 May 1836 | 14 August 1836 | 91 days | Moderate | Francisco Javier de Istúriz (acting) | Isabella II (1833–1868) | |
| Joaquín María Ferrer y Cafranga (Note: He never took office. Mariano Egea, Honorary Councillor of State and Director-General in the Ministry of Finance served as acting minister.) (1781–1846) | 14 August 1836 | 9 September 1836 | 26 days | Progressive | José María Calatrava | Isabella II (1833–1868) | |
| Juan Álvarez Mendizábal (1790–1853) | 11 September 1836 | 18 August 1837 | 341 days | Progressive | José María Calatrava | Isabella II (1833–1868) | |
| Pío Pita Pizarro (1792–1845) | 18 August 1837 | 1 October 1837 | 44 days | Progressive | The Prince of Vergara | Isabella II (1833–1868) | |
| José María Pérez Quintana (1789–1857) acting minister | 1 October 1837 | 7 October 1837 | 6 days | Progressive | The Prince of Vergara | Isabella II (1833–1868) | |
| Antonio María Seijas Bieyra (1767–?) | 7 October 1837 | 16 December 1837 | 70 days | Progressive | The Prince of Vergara | Isabella II (1833–1868) | |
| Antonio María Seijas Bieyra (1767–?) | 7 October 1837 | 16 December 1837 | 70 days | Progressive | Eusebio Bardají y Azara | Isabella II (1833–1868) | |
| Alejandro Mon y Menéndez (1801–1882) | 16 December 1837 | 6 September 1838 | 264 days | Moderate | The Marquess of Heredia | Isabella II (1833–1868) | |
| The Marquess of Montevirgen (1788–1853) | 6 September 1838 | 21 November 1838 | 76 days | Moderate | The Duke of Frías | Isabella II (1833–1868) | |
| Pío Pita Pizarro (1792–1845) | 21 November 1838 | 10 May 1839 | 170 days | Moderate | The Duke of Frías | Isabella II (1833–1868) | |
| Pío Pita Pizarro (1792–1845) | 21 November 1838 | 10 May 1839 | 170 days | Moderate | Evaristo Pérez de Castro | Isabella II (1833–1868) | |
| José Ferraz y Cornel (1796–1854) acting minister | 10 May 1839 | 12 May 1839 | 2 days | Independent | Evaristo Pérez de Castro | Isabella II (1833–1868) | |
| Domingo Jiménez | 12 May 1839 | 19 August 1839 | 99 days | Moderate | Evaristo Pérez de Castro | Isabella II (1833–1868) | |
| José Ferraz y Cornel (1796–1854) acting minister | 19 August 1839 | 20 August 1839 | 1 day | Independent | Evaristo Pérez de Castro | Isabella II (1833–1868) | |
| José Primo de Rivera (1777–1853) acting minister | 20 August 1839 | 3 September 1839 | 14 days | Moderate | Evaristo Pérez de Castro | Isabella II (1833–1868) | |
| José San Millán (1788–1857) | 3 September 1839 | 8 April 1840 | 218 days | Moderate | Evaristo Pérez de Castro | Isabella II (1833–1868) | |
| Ramón de Santillán (1791–1863) | 8 April 1840 | 20 July 1840 | 103 days | Moderate | Evaristo Pérez de Castro | Isabella II (1833–1868) | |
| José Ferraz y Cornel (1796–1854) | 20 July 1840 | 19 August 1840 | 30 days | Independent | The Marquess of Valdeterrazo | Isabella II (1833–1868) | |
| José Ferraz y Cornel (1796–1854) | 20 July 1840 | 19 August 1840 | 30 days | Independent | Valentín Ferraz y Barrau | Isabella II (1833–1868) | |
| José María Secades del Rivero (1785–1868) acting minister | 19 August 1840 | 11 September 1840 | 23 days | Progressive | Valentín Ferraz y Barrau | Isabella II (1833–1868) | |
| José María Secades del Rivero (1785–1868) acting minister | 19 August 1840 | 11 September 1840 | 23 days | Progressive | Modesto Cortázar y Leal de Ibarra | Isabella II (1833–1868) | |
| Domingo Jiménez | 11 September 1840 | 16 September 1840 | 5 days | Progressive | Vicente Sancho y Cobertores | Isabella II (1833–1868) | |
| Agustín Fernández Gamboa (1789–1850) | 3 October 1840 | 6 March 1841 | 154 days | Progressive | The Prince of Vergara | Isabella II (1833–1868) | |
| Joaquín María Ferrer y Cafranga (1777–1861) | 6 March 1841 | 20 May 1841 | 75 days | Progressive | The Prince of Vergara | Isabella II (1833–1868) | |
| Joaquín María Ferrer y Cafranga (1777–1861) | 6 March 1841 | 20 May 1841 | 75 days | Progressive | Joaquín María Ferrer | Isabella II (1833–1868) | |
| Pedro Surra Rull (1794–1850) | 21 May 1841 | 25 May 1842 | 1 year, 4 days | Progressive | The Marquess of Valdeterrazo | Isabella II (1833–1868) | |
| Antonio María del Valle (1791–1863) acting minister | 26 May 1842 | 17 June 1842 | 22 days | Progressive | The Marquess of Valdeterrazo | Isabella II (1833–1868) | |
| Ramón María Calatrava (1786–1876) | 17 June 1842 | 9 May 1843 | 326 days | Progressive | The Marquess of Rodil | Isabella II (1833–1868) | |
| Mateo Miguel Ayllón Alonso (1793–1844) | 9 May 1843 | 19 May 1843 | 10 days | Progressive | Joaquín María López y López | Isabella II (1833–1868) | |
| Juan Álvarez Mendizábal (1790–1853) | 19 May 1843 | 24 July 1843 | 66 days | Progressive | Álvaro Gómez Becerra | Isabella II (1833–1868) | |
| Mateo Miguel Ayllón Alonso (1793–1844) | 24 July 1843 | 24 November 1843 | 118 days | Progressive | Joaquín María López | Isabella II (1833–1868) | |
| Mateo Miguel Ayllón Alonso (1793–1844) | 24 July 1843 | 24 November 1843 | 118 days | Progressive | Salustiano de Olózaga y Almandoz | Isabella II (1833–1868) | |
| Manuel Cantero de San Vicente (1804–1876) | 24 November 1843 | 1 December 1843 | 7 days | Progressive | Salustiano de Olózaga y Almandoz | Isabella II (1833–1868) | |
| José Díaz de Serralde acting minister | 1 December 1843 | 10 December 1843 | 9 days | Independent | Salustiano de Olózaga y Almandoz | Isabella II (1833–1868) | |
| José Díaz de Serralde acting minister | 1 December 1843 | 10 December 1843 | 9 days | Independent | Luis González Bravo | Isabella II (1833–1868) | |
| The Count of Santa Olalla (1799–1851) | 10 December 1843 | 3 May 1844 | 145 days | Moderate | Luis González Bravo | Isabella II (1833–1868) | |
| Alejandro Mon y Menéndez (1801–1882) | 3 May 1844 | 12 February 1846 | 1 year, 285 days | Moderate | The Duke of Valencia | Isabella II (1833–1868) | |
| Manuel María Sierra Moya (1799–1866) acting minister | 12 February 1846 | 15 February 1846 | 3 days | Moderate | The Marquess of Miraflores | Isabella II (1833–1868) | |
| José de la Peña y Aguayo (1801–1853) | 15 February 1846 | 16 March 1846 | 29 days | Moderate | The Marquess of Miraflores | Isabella II (1833–1868) | |
| The Count of the Romera (1800–1869) | 16 March 1846 | 5 April 1846 | 20 days | Moderate | The Duke of Valencia | Isabella II (1833–1868) | |
| Manuel María Sierra Moya (1799–1866) acting minister | 5 April 1846 | 12 April 1846 | 7 days | Moderate | Francisco Javier de Istúriz | Isabella II (1833–1868) | |
| Alejandro Mon y Menéndez (1801–1882) | 12 April 1846 | 28 January 1847 | 291 days | Moderate | Francisco Javier de Istúriz | Isabella II (1833–1868) | |
| Ramón de Santillán (1791–1863) | 28 January 1847 | 28 March 1847 | 59 days | Moderate | The Marquess of Casa Irujo | Isabella II (1833–1868) | |
| The Marquess of Salamanca (1811–1883) | 28 March 1847 | 4 October 1847 | 190 days | Moderate | Joaquín Francisco Pacheco | Isabella II (1833–1868) | |
| The Marquess of Salamanca (1811–1883) | 28 March 1847 | 4 October 1847 | 190 days | Moderate | Florencio García Goyena | Isabella II (1833–1868) | |
| The Count of the Romera (1800–1869) | 4 October 1847 | 24 December 1847 | 81 days | Moderate | The Duke of Valencia | Isabella II (1833–1868) | |
| Manuel Bertrán de Lis y Ribes (1806–1869) | 24 December 1847 | 15 June 1848 | 174 days | Moderate | The Duke of Valencia | Isabella II (1833–1868) | |
| The Count of the Romera (1800–1869) | 15 June 1848 | 11 August 1848 | 57 days | Moderate | The Duke of Valencia | Isabella II (1833–1868) | |
| Alejandro Mon y Menéndez (1801–1882) | 11 August 1848 | 19 August 1849 | 1 year, 8 days | Moderate | The Duke of Valencia | Isabella II (1833–1868) | |
| Juan Bravo Murillo (1803–1873) | 19 August 1849 | 19 October 1849 | 61 days | Moderate | The Duke of Valencia | Isabella II (1833–1868) | |
| Vicente Armesto Hernández (1801–1866) | 19 October 1849 | 20 October 1849 | 1 day | Moderate | The Count of Clonard | Isabella II (1833–1868) | |
| Juan Bravo Murillo (1803–1873) | 20 October 1849 | 29 November 1850 | 1 year, 40 days | Moderate | The Duke of Valencia | Isabella II (1833–1868) | |
| Manuel Seijas Lozano (1800–1868) | 29 November 1850 | 14 January 1851 | 46 days | Moderate | The Duke of Valencia | Isabella II (1833–1868) | |
| Juan Bravo Murillo (1803–1873) | 14 January 1851 | 14 December 1852 | 1 year, 335 days | Moderate | Juan Bravo Murillo | Isabella II (1833–1868) | |
| Gabriel Aristizábal Reutt (1805–1877) | 14 December 1852 | 10 January 1853 | 27 days | Moderate | The Count of Alcoy | Isabella II (1833–1868) | |
| Alejandro Llorente y Lannas (1814–1901) | 10 January 1853 | 14 April 1853 | 94 days | Moderate | The Count of Alcoy | Isabella II (1833–1868) | |
| Manuel Bermúdez de Castro y Díez (1811–1870) | 14 April 1853 | 21 June 1853 | 68 days | Moderate | Francisco de Lersundi y Hormaechea | Isabella II (1833–1868) | |
| Luis María Pastor (1804–1872) | 21 June 1853 | 19 September 1853 | 90 days | Moderate | Francisco de Lersundi y Hormaechea | Isabella II (1833–1868) | |
| Luis María Pastor (1802–1863) | 19 September 1853 | 17 July 1854 | 301 days | Moderate | The Count of San Luis | Isabella II (1833–1868) | |
| Manuel Cantero de San Vicente (1804–1876) | 18 July 1854 | 30 July 1854 | 12 days | Moderate | The Duke of Rivas | Isabella II (1833–1868) | |
| Manuel Cantero de San Vicente (1804–1876) | 18 July 1854 | 30 July 1854 | 12 days | Moderate | The Prince of Vergara | Isabella II (1833–1868) | |
| The Marquess of the Laguna (1792–1864) | 30 July 1854 | 28 December 1854 | 151 days | Progressive | The Prince of Vergara | Isabella II (1833–1868) | |
| The Duke of Sevillano (1790–1864) | 28 December 1854 | 21 January 1855 | 24 days | Progressive | The Prince of Vergara | Isabella II (1833–1868) | |
| Pascual Madoz (1806–1870) | 21 January 1855 | 6 June 1855 | 136 days | Progressive | The Prince of Vergara | Isabella II (1833–1868) | |
| Juan Bruil (Note: Acting during the absences of the Minister: Antonio Santa Cruz, Minister of the Navy (13–20 August 1855).) (1810–1878) | 6 June 1855 | 7 February 1856 | 246 days | Progressive | The Prince of Vergara | Isabella II (1833–1868) | |
| Francisco Santa Cruz Pacheco (1797–1883) | 7 February 1856 | 14 July 1856 | 158 days | Progressive | The Prince of Vergara | Isabella II (1833–1868) | |
| Manuel Cantero de San Vicente (1804–1876) | 14 July 1856 | 20 September 1856 | 68 days | Liberal Unionist | The Duke of Tetuán | Isabella II (1833–1868) | |
| Pedro Salaverría (1821–1896) | 20 September 1856 | 12 October 1856 | 22 days | Liberal Unionist | The Duke of Tetuán | Isabella II (1833–1868) | |
| The Marquess of Barzanallana (1817–1892) | 12 October 1856 | 15 October 1857 | 1 year, 3 days | Moderate | The Duke of Valencia | Isabella II (1833–1868) | |
| Victorio Fernández Lascoiti (1810–1878) acting minister | 15 October 1857 | 25 October 1857 | 10 days | Moderate | The Marquess of Nervión | Isabella II (1833–1868) | |
| Alejandro Mon y Menéndez (1801–1882) | 25 October 1857 | 14 January 1858 | 81 days | Moderate | The Marquess of Nervión | Isabella II (1833–1868) | |
| José Sánchez-Ocaña López de Hontiveros (1798–1887) | 14 January 1858 | 30 June 1858 | 167 days | Moderate | Francisco Javier de Istúriz | Isabella II (1833–1868) | |
| Pedro Salaverría (1821–1896) | 30 June 1858 | 2 March 1863 | 4 years, 245 days | Liberal Unionist | The Duke of Tetuán | Isabella II (1833–1868) | |
| José de Sierra y Cárdenas (1809–1883) | 2 March 1863 | 4 August 1863 | 155 days | Moderate | The Marquess of Miraflores | Isabella II (1833–1868) | |
| Manuel Moreno López (1815–1868) | 4 August 1863 | 13 October 1863 | 70 days | Moderate | The Marquess of Miraflores | Isabella II (1833–1868) | |
| Victorio Fernández Lascoiti (1810–1878) acting minister | 13 October 1863 | 17 January 1864 | 96 days | Moderate | The Marquess of Miraflores | Isabella II (1833–1868) | |
| Juan Bautista Trúpita (1815–1873) | 17 January 1864 | 1 March 1864 | 44 days | Moderate | Lorenzo Arrazola | Isabella II (1833–1868) | |
| Pedro Salaverría (1821–1896) | 1 March 1864 | 16 September 1864 | 199 days | Liberal Unionist | Alejandro Mon y Menéndez | Isabella II (1833–1868) | |
| The Marquess of Barzanallana (1817–1892) | 16 September 1864 | 20 February 1865 | 157 days | Moderate | The Duke of Valencia | Isabella II (1833–1868) | |
| Alejandro de Castro y Casal (1812–1881) | 20 February 1865 | 21 June 1865 | 121 days | Moderate | The Duke of Valencia | Isabella II (1833–1868) | |
| Manuel Alonso Martínez (1827–1891) | 21 June 1865 | 28 May 1866 | 341 days | Liberal Unionist | The Duke of Tetuán | Isabella II (1833–1868) | |
| Antonio Cánovas del Castillo (1828–1897) acting minister | 28 May 1866 | 10 July 1866 | 43 days | Liberal Unionist | The Duke of Tetuán | Isabella II (1833–1868) | |
| The Marquess of Barzanallana (1817–1892) | 10 July 1866 | 10 February 1868 | 1 year, 215 days | Moderate | The Duke of Valencia† | Isabella II (1833–1868) | |
| José Sánchez-Ocaña López de Hontiveros (1798–1887) | 10 February 1868 | 23 April 1868 | 73 days | Moderate | The Duke of Valencia† | Isabella II (1833–1868) | |
| The Marquess of Orovio (1817–1883) | 23 April 1868 | 20 September 1868 | 150 days | Moderate | Luis González Bravo | Isabella II (1833–1868) | |
| The Marquess of Orovio (1817–1883) | 23 April 1868 | 20 September 1868 | 150 days | Moderate | The Marquess of Havana | Isabella II (1833–1868) | |
| José Magaz y Jaime (1826–1894) acting minister | 20 September 1868 | 8 October 1868 | 18 days | Moderate | The Marquess of Havana | Isabella II (1833–1868) | |
| Laureano Figuerola (1816–1903) | 8 October 1868 | 13 July 1869 | 253 days | Progressive | The Duke of the Tower | The Duke of the Tower (regent) (1869–1871) | |
| Laureano Figuerola (1816–1903) | 8 October 1868 | 13 July 1869 | 253 days | Progressive | The Marquess of Castillejos | The Duke of the Tower (regent) (1869–1871) | |
| Constantino de Ardanaz (1820–1873) | 13 July 1869 | 1 November 1869 | 111 days | Liberal Unionist | The Marquess of Castillejos | The Duke of the Tower (regent) (1869–1871) | |
| Laureano Figuerola (1816–1903) | 1 November 1869 | 2 December 1870 | 1 year, 31 days | Progressive | The Marquess of Castillejos | The Duke of the Tower (regent) (1869–1871) | |
| Segismundo Moret (1833–1913) | 2 December 1870 | 10 July 1871 | 220 days | Progressive | Juan Bautista Topete | The Duke of the Tower (regent) (1869–1871) | |
| Segismundo Moret (1833–1913) | 2 December 1870 | 10 July 1871 | 220 days | Progressive | The Duke of the Tower | Amadeo I (1871–1873) | |
| Práxedes Mateo Sagasta (1825–1903) acting minister | 10 July 1871 | 24 July 1871 | 14 days | Progressive | The Duke of the Tower | Amadeo I (1871–1873) | |
| Servando Ruiz-Gómez y González-Llanos (1821–1888) | 24 July 1871 | 5 October 1871 | 73 days | Radical-Democrat | Manuel Ruiz Zorrilla | Amadeo I (1871–1873) | |
| Santiago de Angulo Ortiz de Traspeña (1823–1900) | 5 October 1871 | 20 February 1872 | 92 days | Constitutionalist | The Marquess of San Rafael | Amadeo I (1871–1873) | |
| Santiago de Angulo Ortiz de Traspeña (1823–1900) | 5 October 1871 | 20 February 1872 | 92 days | Constitutionalist | Práxedes Mateo Sagasta | Amadeo I (1871–1873) | |
| Juan Francisco Camacho (1813–1896) | 20 February 1872 | 26 May 1872 | 96 days | Constitutionalist | Práxedes Mateo Sagasta | Amadeo I (1871–1873) | |
| The Marquess of the Pazo de la Merced (1823–1898) | 26 May 1872 | 13 June 1872 | 18 days | Constitutionalist | The Duke of the Tower | Amadeo I (1871–1873) | |
| Servando Ruiz-Gómez y González-Llanos (1821–1888) | 13 June 1872 | 19 December 1872 | 189 days | Radical-Democrat | Manuel Ruiz Zorrilla | Amadeo I (1871–1873) | |
| José Echegaray (1832–1916) | 19 December 1872 | 24 February 1873 | 67 days | Radical-Democrat | Manuel Ruiz Zorrilla | Amadeo I (1871–1873) | |
| José Echegaray (1832–1916) | 19 December 1872 | 24 February 1873 | 67 days | Radical-Democrat | Estanislao Figueras | List of presidents of the First Republic | |
| Juan Tutau y Verges (1829–1893) | 24 February 1873 | 11 June 1873 | 107 days | Federal Republican | Estanislao Figueras | List of presidents of the First Republic | |
| Teodoro Ladico (1825–1912) | 11 June 1873 | 28 June 1873 | 17 days | Federal Republican | Francisco Pi y Margall | List of presidents of the First Republic | |
| José de Carvajal y Hué (1835–1899) | 28 June 1873 | 4 September 1873 | 68 days | Federal Republican | Francisco Pi y Margall | List of presidents of the First Republic | |
| José de Carvajal y Hué (1835–1899) | 28 June 1873 | 4 September 1873 | 68 days | Federal Republican | Nicolás Salmerón | List of presidents of the First Republic | |
| Manuel Pedregal y Cañedo (1831–1896) | 8 September 1873 | 3 January 1874 | 117 days | Federal Republican | Emilio Castelar | List of presidents of the First Republic | |
| Práxedes Mateo Sagasta (1825–1903) acting minister | 3 January 1874 | 4 January 1874 | 1 day | Constitutionalist | The Duke of the Tower | List of presidents of the First Republic | |
| José Echegaray (1832–1916) | 4 January 1874 | 13 May 1874 | 129 days | Radical-Democrat | The Duke of the Tower | List of presidents of the First Republic | |
| Juan Francisco Camacho (1813–1896) | 13 May 1874 | 31 December 1874 | 232 days | Constitutionalist | The Marquess of Sierra Bullones | List of presidents of the First Republic | |
| Juan Francisco Camacho (1813–1896) | 13 May 1874 | 31 December 1874 | 232 days | Constitutionalist | Práxedes Mateo Sagasta | List of presidents of the First Republic | |
| Pedro Salaverría (Note: Acting during illness of the Minister: Antonio Cánovas del Castillo, Prime Minister (22 June to 25 July 1876).) (1821–1896) | 31 December 1874 | 25 July 1876 | 1 year, 207 days | Conservative | Antonio Cánovas del Castillo | Alfonso XII (1874–1885) | |
| Pedro Salaverría (1821–1896) | 31 December 1874 | 25 July 1876 | 1 year, 207 days | Conservative | Joaquín Jovellar y Soler | Alfonso XII (1874–1885) | |
| Pedro Salaverría (1821–1896) | 31 December 1874 | 25 July 1876 | 1 year, 207 days | Conservative | Antonio Cánovas del Castillo | Alfonso XII (1874–1885) | |
| José García Barzanallana (1819–1903) | 25 July 1876 | 11 July 1877 | 351 days | Conservative | Antonio Cánovas del Castillo | Alfonso XII (1874–1885) | |
| The Marquess of Orovio (1817–1883) | 11 July 1877 | 19 March 1880 | 2 years, 252 days | Conservative | Antonio Cánovas del Castillo | Alfonso XII (1874–1885) | |
| The Marquess of Orovio (1817–1883) | 11 July 1877 | 19 March 1880 | 2 years, 252 days | Conservative | Arsenio Martínez Campos | Alfonso XII (1874–1885) | |
| The Marquess of Orovio (1817–1883) | 11 July 1877 | 19 March 1880 | 2 years, 252 days | Conservative | Antonio Cánovas del Castillo | Alfonso XII (1874–1885) | |
| Fernando Cos-Gayón (1825–1898) | 19 March 1880 | 8 February 1881 | 326 days | Conservative | Antonio Cánovas del Castillo | Alfonso XII (1874–1885) | |
| Juan Francisco Camacho (1813–1896) | 8 February 1881 | 9 January 1883 | 1 year, 335 days | Liberal | Práxedes Mateo Sagasta | Alfonso XII (1874–1885) | |
| Justo Pelayo de la Cuesta Núñez (1823–1889) | 9 January 1883 | 13 October 1883 | 277 days | Liberal | Práxedes Mateo Sagasta | Alfonso XII (1874–1885) | |
| José Gallostra y Frau (1833–1888) | 13 October 1883 | 18 January 1884 | 97 days | Liberal | José Posada Herrera | Alfonso XII (1874–1885) | |
| Fernando Cos-Gayón (1825–1898) | 18 January 1884 | 27 November 1885 | 1 year, 313 days | Conservative | Antonio Cánovas del Castillo | Alfonso XII (1874–1885) | |
| Juan Francisco Camacho (1813–1896) | 27 November 1885 | 2 August 1886 | 248 days | Liberal | Práxedes Mateo Sagasta | Alfonso XIII (1886–1931) | |
| Joaquín López Puigcerver (1841–1906) | 2 August 1886 | 11 December 1888 | 2 years, 131 days | Liberal | Práxedes Mateo Sagasta | Alfonso XIII (1886–1931) | |
| Venancio González y Fernández (1831–1897) | 11 December 1888 | 21 January 1890 | 1 year, 41 days | Liberal | Práxedes Mateo Sagasta | Alfonso XIII (1886–1931) | |
| The Count of Albox (1842–1931) | 21 January 1890 | 5 July 1890 | 165 days | Liberal | Práxedes Mateo Sagasta | Alfonso XIII (1886–1931) | |
| Fernando Cos-Gayón (1825–1898) | 5 July 1890 | 23 November 1891 | 1 year, 141 days | Conservative | Antonio Cánovas del Castillo | Alfonso XIII (1886–1931) | |
| Juan de la Concha Castañeda (1818–1903) | 23 November 1891 | 11 December 1892 | 1 year, 18 days | Conservative | Antonio Cánovas del Castillo | Alfonso XIII (1886–1931) | |
| Germán Gamazo (1840–1901) | 11 December 1892 | 12 March 1894 | 1 year, 91 days | Liberal | Práxedes Mateo Sagasta | Alfonso XIII (1886–1931) | |
| Amós Salvador Rodrigáñez (1845–1922) | 12 March 1894 | 17 December 1894 | 280 days | Liberal | Práxedes Mateo Sagasta | Alfonso XIII (1886–1931) | |
| José Canalejas y Méndez (1854–1912) | 17 December 1894 | 23 March 1895 | 96 days | Liberal | Práxedes Mateo Sagasta | Alfonso XIII (1886–1931) | |
| Juan Navarro-Reverter (1844–1924) | 23 March 1895 | 4 October 1897 | 2 years, 195 days | Conservative | Antonio Cánovas del Castillo† | Alfonso XIII (1886–1931) | |
| Juan Navarro-Reverter (1844–1924) | 23 March 1895 | 4 October 1897 | 2 years, 195 days | Conservative | Marcelo Azcárraga | Alfonso XIII (1886–1931) | |
| Joaquín López Puigcerver (1841–1906) | 4 October 1897 | 4 March 1899 | 1 year, 151 days | Liberal | Práxedes Mateo Sagasta | Alfonso XIII (1886–1931) | |
| The Marquess of Pozo Rubio (1848–1905) | 4 March 1899 | 6 July 1900 | 1 year, 124 days | Conservative | Francisco Silvela | Alfonso XIII (1886–1931) | |
| Manuel Allendesalazar (1837–1914) | 6 July 1900 | 6 March 1901 | 243 days | Conservative | Francisco Silvela | Alfonso XIII (1886–1931) | |
| Manuel Allendesalazar (1837–1914) | 6 July 1900 | 6 March 1901 | 243 days | Conservative | Marcelo Azcárraga | Alfonso XIII (1886–1931) | |
| Ángel Urzaiz (1856–1926) | 6 March 1901 | 19 March 1902 | 1 year, 13 days | Liberal | Práxedes Mateo Sagasta | Alfonso XIII (1886–1931) | |
| Tirso Rodrigáñez (1853–1935) | 19 March 1902 | 15 November 1902 | 241 days | Liberal | Práxedes Mateo Sagasta | Alfonso XIII (1886–1931) | |
| The Count of Albox (1842–1931) | 15 November 1902 | 6 December 1902 | 21 days | Liberal | Práxedes Mateo Sagasta | Alfonso XIII (1886–1931) | |
| The Marquess of Pozo Rubio (1848–1905) | 6 December 1902 | 20 March 1903 | 104 days | Conservative | Francisco Silvela | Alfonso XIII (1886–1931) | |
| Faustino Rodríguez-San Pedro (1833–1925) | 20 March 1903 | 20 July 1903 | 122 days | Conservative | Francisco Silvela | Alfonso XIII (1886–1931) | |
| Augusto González Besada (1865–1919) | 20 July 1903 | 5 December 1903 | 138 days | Conservative | The Marquess of Pozo Rubio | Alfonso XIII (1886–1931) | |
| The Count of Valencia de Don Juan (1853–1922) | 5 December 1903 | 16 December 1904 | 1 year, 11 days | Conservative | Antonio Maura | Alfonso XIII (1886–1931) | |
| Tomás Castellano y Villarroya (1850–1906) | 16 December 1904 | 27 January 1905 | 42 days | Conservative | Marcelo Azcárraga | Alfonso XIII (1886–1931) | |
| Antonio García Alix (1852–1911) | 27 January 1905 | 23 June 1905 | 147 days | Conservative | The Marquess of Pozo Rubio | Alfonso XIII (1886–1931) | |
| Ángel Urzaiz (1856–1926) | 23 June 1905 | 18 July 1905 | 25 days | Liberal | Eugenio Montero Ríos | Alfonso XIII (1886–1931) | |
| José Echegaray (Note: Acting during absence of the Minister: Bernardo Mateo Sagasta, Under-Secretary (31 August – 11 September 1905).) (1832–1916) | 18 July 1905 | 1 December 1905 | 136 days | Liberal | Eugenio Montero Ríos | Alfonso XIII (1886–1931) | |
| Amós Salvador Rodrigáñez (1845–1922) | 1 December 1905 | 6 July 1906 | 217 days | Liberal | Segismundo Moret | Alfonso XIII (1886–1931) | |
| Juan Navarro-Reverter (Note: Acting during absence of the Minister: Federico Requejo Avedillo, Under-Secretary (18–31 August 1906).) (1844–1924) | 6 July 1906 | 30 November 1906 | 147 days | Liberal | José López Domínguez | Alfonso XIII (1886–1931) | |
| Eleuterio Delgado (1852–1908) | 30 November 1906 | 4 December 1906 | 4 days | Liberal | Segismundo Moret | Alfonso XIII (1886–1931) | |
| Juan Navarro-Reverter (1844–1924) | 4 December 1906 | 25 January 1907 | 52 days | Liberal | The Marquess of Vega de Armijo | Alfonso XIII (1886–1931) | |
| The Count of Valencia de Don Juan (Note: Acting during absence of the Minister: Luis Espada Guntín, Under-Secretary (17 August – 21 September 1907).) (1853–1922) | 25 January 1907 | 23 February 1908 | 1 year, 29 days | Conservative | Antonio Maura | Alfonso XIII (1886–1931) | |
| Cayetano Sánchez Bustillo (1839–1908) | 23 February 1908 | 14 September 1908† | 204 days | Conservative | Antonio Maura | Alfonso XIII (1886–1931) | |
| Augusto González Besada (Note: Acting during absence of the Minister: Rafael Andrade Navarrete, Under-Secretary (21 September – 7 October 1908).) (1865–1919) | 14 September 1908 | 21 October 1909 | 1 year, 37 days | Conservative | Antonio Maura | Alfonso XIII (1886–1931) | |
| Juan Alvarado y del Saz (1856–1935) | 21 October 1909 | 9 February 1910 | 111 days | Liberal | Segismundo Moret | Alfonso XIII (1886–1931) | |
| Eduardo Cobián (Note: Acting during absence of the Minister: Alfredo Zavala y Camps, Under-Secretary (11–17 August 1910 and February 21 to March 7, 1911) and Antonio Martínez Tudela, State Representative in the Tobacco Monopoly (22–30 August 1910).) (1857–1918) | 9 February 1910 | 3 April 1911 | 1 year, 53 days | Liberal | José Canalejas y Méndez† | Alfonso XIII (1886–1931) | |
| Tirso Rodrigáñez (1853–1935) | 3 April 1911 | 12 March 1912 | 344 days | Liberal | José Canalejas y Méndez† | Alfonso XIII (1886–1931) | |
| Juan Navarro-Reverter (Note: Acting during absence of the Minister: Isidro Pérez Oliva, Under-Secretary (July 23 to September 11, 1912).) (1844–1924) | 12 March 1912 | 31 December 1912 | 294 days | Liberal | José Canalejas y Méndez† | Alfonso XIII (1886–1931) | |
| Juan Navarro-Reverter (1844–1924) | 12 March 1912 | 31 December 1912 | 294 days | Liberal | The Marquess of Alhucemas (Note: He acted as acting prime minister after the assassination of José Canalejas on 12 November 1912) | Alfonso XIII (1886–1931) | |
| Juan Navarro-Reverter (1844–1924) | 12 March 1912 | 31 December 1912 | 294 days | Liberal | The Count of Romanones | Alfonso XIII (1886–1931) | |
| Félix Suárez Inclán (1854–1939) | 31 December 1912 | 27 October 1913 | 300 days | Liberal | The Count of Romanones | Alfonso XIII (1886–1931) | |
| The Count of Bugallal (Note: Acting during absence of the Minister: Mariano Ordóñez García, Under-Secretary (8–20 October 1914; August 4 to September 6, 1915; and September 19 to October 1, 1917).) (1861–1932) | 27 October 1913 | 9 December 1915 | 2 years, 43 days | Conservative | Eduardo Dato | Alfonso XIII (1886–1931) | |
| Ángel Urzaiz (1856–1926) | 9 December 1915 | 25 February 1916 | 78 days | Liberal | The Count of Romanones | Alfonso XIII (1886–1931) | |
| Miguel Villanueva y Gómez (1852–1931) | 25 February 1916 | 30 April 1916 | 65 days | Liberal | The Count of Romanones | Alfonso XIII (1886–1931) | |
| Santiago Alba y Bonifaz (1872–1949) | 30 April 1916 | 11 June 1917 | 1 year, 42 days | Liberal | The Count of Romanones | Alfonso XIII (1886–1931) | |
| Santiago Alba y Bonifaz (1872–1949) | 30 April 1916 | 11 June 1917 | 1 year, 42 days | Liberal | The Marquess of Alhucemas | Alfonso XIII (1886–1931) | |
| The Count of Bugallal (1861–1932) | 11 June 1917 | 3 November 1917 | 145 days | Conservative | Eduardo Dato | Alfonso XIII (1886–1931) | |
| Juan Ventosa (Note: Acting during absence of the Minister: Pablo Garnica y Echevarría, Under-Secretary (15–20 February 1918 and 11–30 August 1918).) (1879–1959) | 3 November 1917 | 2 March 1918 | 119 days | Catalan Regionalist | The Marquess of Alhucemas | Alfonso XIII (1886–1931) | |
| The Count of Caralt (1862–1944) | 2 March 1918 | 22 March 1918 | 20 days | Liberal | The Marquess of Alhucemas | Alfonso XIII (1886–1931) | |
| Augusto González Besada (1865–1919) | 22 March 1918 | 9 November 1918 | 232 days | Conservative | Antonio Maura | Alfonso XIII (1886–1931) | |
| Santiago Alba y Bonifaz (1872–1949) | 9 November 1918 | 5 December 1918 | 26 days | Liberal | The Marquess of Alhucemas | Alfonso XIII (1886–1931) | |
| Fermín Calbetón y Blanchón (Note: Fermín Calbetón fell ill at the end of January 1919, and was replaced in his duties by José Gómez-Acebo y Cortina, Marquess of Cortina, Minister of Development on January 31. Calbetón died in February, and Gómez-Acebo continued in the role until the end of the government's term.) (1853–1919) | 5 December 1918 | 4 February 1919† | 61 days | Liberal | The Count of Romanones | Alfonso XIII (1886–1931) | |
| The Marquess of Cortina (1860–1932) acting minister | 4 February 1919 | 15 April 1919 | 70 days | Liberal | The Count of Romanones | Alfonso XIII (1886–1931) | |
| Juan de la Cierva y Peñafiel (1864–1938) | 15 April 1919 | 20 July 1919 | 96 days | Conservative | Antonio Maura | Alfonso XIII (1886–1931) | |
| The Count of Bugallal (Note: Acting during absence of the Minister: Manuel Argüelles Argüelles, Under-Secretary (August 20 to September 8, 1919).) (1861–1932) | 20 July 1919 | 5 May 1920 | 290 days | Conservative | Joaquín Sánchez de Toca | Alfonso XIII (1886–1931) | |
| The Count of Bugallal (1861–1932) | 20 July 1919 | 5 May 1920 | 290 days | Conservative | Manuel Allendesalazar | Alfonso XIII (1886–1931) | |
| Lorenzo Domínguez Pascual (1863–1926) | 5 May 1920 | 28 January 1921 | 268 days | Conservative | Eduardo Dato† | Alfonso XIII (1886–1931) | |
| Manuel Argüelles Argüelles (1875–1945) | 28 January 1921 | 7 July 1921 | 160 days | Conservative | Eduardo Dato† | Alfonso XIII (1886–1931) | |
| Manuel Argüelles Argüelles (1875–1945) | 28 January 1921 | 7 July 1921 | 160 days | Conservative | The Count of Bugallal (Note: He acted acting prime minister after the assassination of Eduardo Dato from March 8 to March 13, 1921) | Alfonso XIII (1886–1931) | |
| Manuel Argüelles Argüelles (1875–1945) | 28 January 1921 | 7 July 1921 | 160 days | Conservative | Manuel Allendesalazar | Alfonso XIII (1886–1931) | |
| Mariano Ordóñez García (1874–1938) | 7 July 1921 | 14 August 1921 | 38 days | Conservative | Manuel Allendesalazar | Alfonso XIII (1886–1931) | |
| Francesc Cambó (Note: Acting during absence of the Minister: José Gómez Acebo, Marquess of Cortina, Minister of the Navy (14–22 August 1921).) (1876–1947) | 14 August 1921 | 8 March 1922 | 206 days | Catalan Regionalist | Antonio Maura | Alfonso XIII (1886–1931) | |
| Francisco Bergamín y García (Note: Acting during absence of the Minister: Juan José Ruano de la Sota, Under-Secretary (29 July – 25 August 1922).) (1855–1937) | 8 March 1922 | 4 December 1922 | 271 days | Conservative | José Sánchez-Guerra y Martínez | Alfonso XIII (1886–1931) | |
| Juan José Ruano de la Sota (1871–1930) | 4 December 1922 | 7 December 1922 | 3 days | Conservative | José Sánchez-Guerra y Martínez | Alfonso XIII (1886–1931) | |
| José Manuel Pedregal (1871–1948) | 7 December 1922 | 4 April 1923 | 118 days | Reformist | The Marquess of Alhucemas | Alfonso XIII (1886–1931) | |
| Miguel Villanueva y Gómez (1852–1931) | 4 April 1923 | 3 September 1923 | 152 days | Liberal | The Marquess of Alhucemas | Alfonso XIII (1886–1931) | |
| Félix Suárez Inclán (1854–1939) | 3 September 1923 | 15 September 1923 | 12 days | Liberal | The Marquess of Alhucemas | Alfonso XIII (1886–1931) | |
| Enrique Illana y Sánchez de Vargas (Note: Ordinary discharge of duties.) (1865–1942) acting minister | 15 September 1923 | 21 December 1923 | 97 days | Independent | The Marquess of Estella | Alfonso XIII (1886–1931) | |
| Carlos Vergara Cailleaux (1854–1929) acting minister | 21 December 1923 | 25 February 1924 | 66 days | Independent | The Marquess of Estella | Alfonso XIII (1886–1931) | |
| José Corral y Larre (1866–1938) acting minister | 25 February 1924 | 3 December 1925 | 1 year, 281 days | Independent | The Marquess of Estella | Alfonso XIII (1886–1931) | |
| The Duke of Calvo Sotelo (1893–1936) | 3 December 1925 | 21 January 1930 | 4 years, 49 days | Patriotic Unionist | The Marquess of Estella | Alfonso XIII (1886–1931) | |
| The Count of the Andes (1880–1963) | 21 January 1930 | 30 January 1930 | 9 days | Patriotic Unionist | The Marquess of Estella | Alfonso XIII (1886–1931) | |
| Manuel Argüelles Argüelles (1875–1945) | 30 January 1930 | 20 August 1930 | 202 days | Conservative | The Count of Xauen | Alfonso XIII (1886–1931) | |
| Julio Wais San Martín (1878–1954) | 20 August 1930 | 18 February 1931 | 182 days | Conservative | The Count of Xauen | Alfonso XIII (1886–1931) | |
| Juan Ventosa (1879–1959) | 18 February 1931 | 14 April 1931 | 55 days | Catalan Regionalist | Juan Bautista Aznar-Cabañas | Alfonso XIII (1886–1931) | |
| Indalecio Prieto (Note: During the absence of the Minister: Niceto Alcalá-Zamora, Prime Minister (26–28 June 1931)) (1883–1962) | 15 April 1931 | 16 December 1931 | 245 days | Socialist | Niceto Alcalá-Zamora | Niceto Alcalá-Zamora (1931–1936) | |
| Indalecio Prieto (1883–1962) | 15 April 1931 | 16 December 1931 | 245 days | Socialist | Manuel Azaña | Niceto Alcalá-Zamora (1931–1936) | |
| Jaime Carner (Note: During the illness of the Minister: Manuel Azaña, Prime Minister (23 February – 12 June 1933)) (1867–1934) | 16 December 1931 | 12 June 1933 | 1 year, 178 days | Catalan Republican Left | Manuel Azaña | Niceto Alcalá-Zamora (1931–1936) | |
| Agustín Viñuales (1881–1959) | 12 June 1933 | 12 September 1933 | 92 days | Republican Action | Manuel Azaña | Niceto Alcalá-Zamora (1931–1936) | |
| Antonio Lara Zárate (1881–1956) | 12 September 1933 | 3 March 1934 | 172 days | Republican Action | Alejandro Lerroux | Niceto Alcalá-Zamora (1931–1936) | |
| Antonio Lara Zárate (1881–1956) | 12 September 1933 | 3 March 1934 | 172 days | Republican Action | Diego Martínez Barrio | Niceto Alcalá-Zamora (1931–1936) | |
| Antonio Lara Zárate (1881–1956) | 12 September 1933 | 3 March 1934 | 172 days | Republican Action | Alejandro Lerroux | Niceto Alcalá-Zamora (1931–1936) | |
| Manuel Marraco Ramón (1870–1956) | 3 March 1934 | 3 April 1935 | 1 year, 31 days | Radical Republican | Alejandro Lerroux | Niceto Alcalá-Zamora (1931–1936) | |
| Manuel Marraco Ramón (1870–1956) | 3 March 1934 | 3 April 1935 | 1 year, 31 days | Radical Republican | Ricardo Samper | Niceto Alcalá-Zamora (1931–1936) | |
| Manuel Marraco Ramón (1870–1956) | 3 March 1934 | 3 April 1935 | 1 year, 31 days | Radical Republican | Alejandro Lerroux | Niceto Alcalá-Zamora (1931–1936) | |
| Alfredo de Zavala y Lafora (1883–1995) | 3 April 1935 | 6 May 1935 | 33 days | Independent | Alejandro Lerroux | Niceto Alcalá-Zamora (1931–1936) | |
| Joaquín Chapaprieta (1871–1951) | 6 May 1935 | 30 December 1935 | 238 days | Independent | Alejandro Lerroux | Niceto Alcalá-Zamora (1931–1936) | |
| Joaquín Chapaprieta (1871–1951) | 6 May 1935 | 30 December 1935 | 238 days | Independent | Joaquín Chapaprieta | Niceto Alcalá-Zamora (1931–1936) | |
| Joaquín Chapaprieta (1871–1951) | 6 May 1935 | 30 December 1935 | 238 days | Independent | Manuel Portela Valladares | Niceto Alcalá-Zamora (1931–1936) | |
| Manuel Rico Avello (1886–1936) | 30 December 1935 | 19 February 1936 | 51 days | Independent | Manuel Portela Valladares | Niceto Alcalá-Zamora (1931–1936) | |
| Gabriel Franco López (1897–1972) | 19 February 1936 | 13 May 1936 | 84 days | Republican Left | Manuel Azaña | Niceto Alcalá-Zamora (1931–1936) | |
| Gabriel Franco López (1897–1972) | 19 February 1936 | 13 May 1936 | 84 days | Republican Left | Augusto Barcia Trelles (Note: Acting prime minister from 10 to 13 May 1936) | Manuel Azaña (1936–1939) | |
| Enrique Ramos Ramos (1873–1957) | 13 May 1936 | 4 September 1936 | 114 days | Republican Left | Santiago Casares Quiroga | Manuel Azaña (1936–1939) | |
| Enrique Ramos Ramos (1873–1957) | 13 May 1936 | 4 September 1936 | 114 days | Republican Left | Diego Martínez Barrio | Manuel Azaña (1936–1939) | |
| Enrique Ramos Ramos (1873–1957) | 13 May 1936 | 4 September 1936 | 114 days | Republican Left | José Giral | Manuel Azaña (1936–1939) | |
| Juan Negrín (1892–1956) | 4 September 1936 | 5 April 1938 | 1 year, 213 days | Socialist | Francisco Largo Caballero | Manuel Azaña (1936–1939) | |
| Juan Negrín (1892–1956) | 4 September 1936 | 5 April 1938 | 1 year, 213 days | Socialist | Juan Negrín | Manuel Azaña (1936–1939) | |
| Francisco Méndez Aspe (1892–1958) | 5 April 1938 | 5 March 1939 | 334 days | Republican Left | Juan Negrín | Manuel Azaña (1936–1939) | |
| Manuel González Marín (1870–1940) | 5 March 1939 | 31 March 1939 | 26 days | Independent (CNT) | National Defence Council | José Miaja (1939) | |
| Andrés Amado Reygondaud (Note: Serving under the title of "Chairman of the Finance Commission" until 31 January 1938.) (1886–1946) | 5 October 1936 | 9 August 1939 | 2 years, 308 days | Independent | Junta Técnica del Estado | Francisco Franco (1939–1975) | |
| Andrés Amado Reygondaud (1886–1946) | 5 October 1936 | 9 August 1939 | 2 years, 308 days | Independent | Franco I | Francisco Franco (1939–1975) | |
| José Larraz López (1904–1973) | 9 August 1939 | 19 May 1941 | 1 year, 283 days | National Movement | Franco II | Francisco Franco (1939–1975) | |
| The Count of Benjumea (1878–1963) | 19 May 1941 | 19 July 1951 | 11 years, 344 days | National Movement | Franco II | Francisco Franco (1939–1975) | |
| The Count of Benjumea (1878–1963) | 19 May 1941 | 19 July 1951 | 11 years, 344 days | National Movement | Franco III | Francisco Franco (1939–1975) | |
| Francisco Gómez de Llano (1896–1970) | 19 July 1951 | 25 February 1957 | 5 years, 221 days | National Movement | Franco IV | Francisco Franco (1939–1975) | |
| Mariano Navarro Rubio (1913–2001) | 25 February 1957 | 7 July 1965 | 8 years, 132 days | National Movement | Franco V | Francisco Franco (1939–1975) | |
| Mariano Navarro Rubio (1913–2001) | 25 February 1957 | 7 July 1965 | 8 years, 132 days | National Movement | Franco VI | Francisco Franco (1939–1975) | |
| Juan José Espinosa San Martín (1918–1982) | 7 July 1965 | 29 October 1969 | 4 years, 114 days | National Movement | Franco VII | Francisco Franco (1939–1975) | |
| Alberto Monreal Luque (1926–2014) | 29 October 1969 | 11 June 1973 | 3 years, 225 days | National Movement | Franco VIII | Francisco Franco (1939–1975) | |
| Antonio Barrera de Irimo (1929–2014) | 11 June 1973 | 29 October 1974 | 1 year, 140 days | National Movement | Luis Carrero Blanco† | Francisco Franco (1939–1975) | |
| Antonio Barrera de Irimo (1929–2014) | 11 June 1973 | 29 October 1974 | 1 year, 140 days | National Movement | The Duke of Fernández-Miranda (acting) | Francisco Franco (1939–1975) | |
| Antonio Barrera de Irimo (1929–2014) | 11 June 1973 | 29 October 1974 | 1 year, 140 days | National Movement | The Marquess of Arias Navarro | Francisco Franco (1939–1975) | |
| Rafael Cabello de Alba (1925–2010) | 29 October 1974 | 11 December 1975 | 1 year, 43 days | National Movement | The Marquess of Arias Navarro | Francisco Franco (1939–1975) | |
| Rafael Cabello de Alba (1925–2010) | 29 October 1974 | 11 December 1975 | 1 year, 43 days | National Movement | The Marquess of Arias Navarro | Juan Carlos I (1975–2014) | |
| The Marquess of Villar Mir (1931–2024) | 11 December 1975 | 7 July 1976 | 209 days | National Movement | The Marquess of Arias Navarro | Juan Carlos I (1975–2014) | |
| Eduardo Carriles (1923–2020) | 7 July 1976 | 4 July 1977 | 362 days | Spanish Democratic Unionist | The Duke of Suárez | Juan Carlos I (1975–2014) | |
| Francisco Fernández Ordóñez (1930–1992) | 4 July 1977 | 5 April 1979 | 1 year, 275 days | Centrist | The Duke of Suárez | Juan Carlos I (1975–2014) | |
| Jaime García Añoveros (1932–2000) | 5 April 1979 | 2 December 1982 | 3 years, 241 days | Centrist | The Duke of Suárez | Juan Carlos I (1975–2014) | |
| Jaime García Añoveros (1932–2000) | 5 April 1979 | 2 December 1982 | 3 years, 241 days | Centrist | The Marquess of Ría de Ribadeo | Juan Carlos I (1975–2014) | |
| Miguel Boyer (1939–2014) | 2 December 1982 | 4 July 1985 | 2 years, 214 days | Socialist | Felipe González | Juan Carlos I (1975–2014) | |
| Carlos Solchaga (born 1944) | 4 July 1985 | 13 July 1993 | 8 years, 9 days | Socialist | Felipe González | Juan Carlos I (1975–2014) | |
| Pedro Solbes (1942–2023) | 13 July 1993 | 5 May 1996 | 2 years, 297 days | Socialist | Felipe González | Juan Carlos I (1975–2014) | |
| Rodrigo Rato (born 1949) | 5 May 1996 | 28 April 2000 | 3 years, 359 days | Popular | José María Aznar | Juan Carlos I (1975–2014) | |
| Cristóbal Montoro (1950–) | 28 April 2000 | 18 April 2004 | 3 years, 356 days | Popular | José María Aznar | Juan Carlos I (1975–2014) | |
| Pedro Solbes (1942–2023) | 18 April 2004 | 8 April 2009 | 4 years, 355 days | Socialist | José Luis Rodríguez Zapatero | Juan Carlos I (1975–2014) | |
| Elena Salgado (born 1949) | 8 April 2009 | 22 December 2011 | 2 years, 258 days | Independent | José Luis Rodríguez Zapatero | Juan Carlos I (1975–2014) | |
| Cristóbal Montoro (1950–) | 22 December 2011 | 7 June 2018 | 6 years, 167 days | Popular | Mariano Rajoy | Juan Carlos I (1975–2014) | |
| Cristóbal Montoro (1950–) | 22 December 2011 | 7 June 2018 | 6 years, 167 days | Popular | Mariano Rajoy | Felipe VI (2014-present) | |
| María Jesús Montero (born 1966) | 7 June 2018 | 27 March 2026 | 7 years, 293 days | Socialist | Pedro Sánchez | Felipe VI (2014-present) | |
| Arcadi España (born 1974) | 27 March 2026 | Incumbent | 231 days | Socialist | Pedro Sánchez | Felipe VI (2014-present) | |
