= Dictablanda of Dámaso Berenguer =

Final period of the Spanish Restoration and King Alfonso XIII's reign

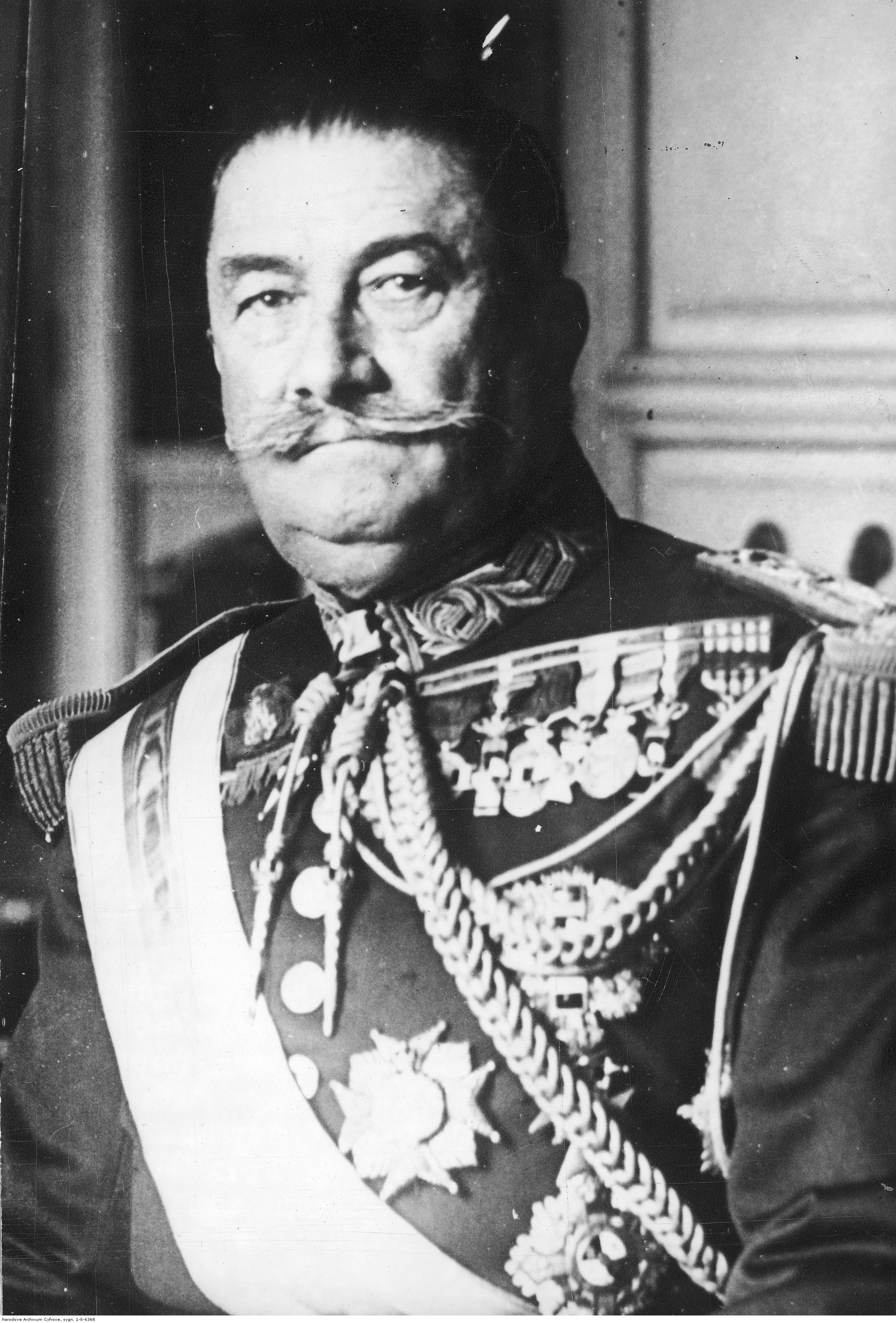
General Dámaso Berenguer

The Dictablanda of Dámaso Berenguer (dictablanda being a pun meaning "soft dictatorship") was the final period of the Spanish Restoration and of King Alfonso XIII’s reign. This period saw two different governments: Dámaso Berenguer’s government, formed in January 1930 with the goal of reestablishing “constitutional normalcy” following Primo de Rivera’s dictatorship, and President Juan Bautista Aznar’s government, formed a year later. The latter paved the way to the proclamation of the Second Spanish Republic. The term dictablanda was used by the press to refer to the ambivalence of Berenguer’s government, which neither continued the model of the former dictatorship nor did it fully reestablish the 1876 Constitution.

== The Berenguer error ==
Alfonso XIII named General Dámaso Berenguer president on 28 January 1930, with the goal of returning the country to “constitutional normalcy”. However, historians have pointed out the impossibility of achieving this by attempting to transition towards a liberal regime by simply reestablishing the political order that existed before the 1923 coup and not considering the link between the Crown and Primo de Rivera’s dictatorship. Nonetheless, this mistake was made by the King and his government by trying to bring Spain back to the 1876 Constitution despite it having been abolished for six years. Since 1923, Alfonso XIII had been a king without a Constitution. During that time, his rule was legitimized not by a written document, but by a coup d’état allowed by the King. The Monarchy had become associated with the dictatorship, and it now attempted to survive when the dictatorship had ceased to exist.

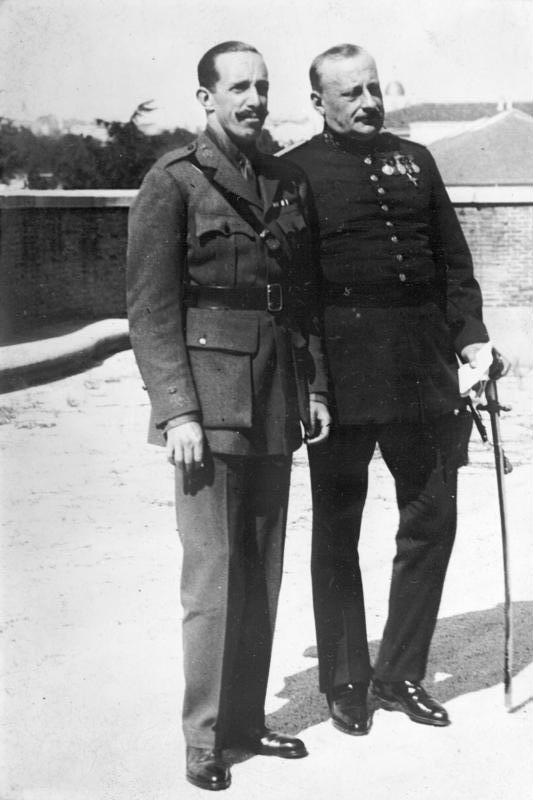
King Alfonso XIII and Miguel Primo de Rivera

Republican politicians and “monarchists without a King”, as well as numerous jurists, dismissed the return to “constitutional normalcy” as impossible. On 12 October 1930, jurist Mariano Gómez would write: “Spain lives without a Constitution”. According to Gómez, Primo de Rivera’s dictatorship initiated a constituent process that could only be concluded with a return to normalcy through “a constituent government, constituent elections presided by a neutral power that wasn’t a belligerent in the conflict created by the dictatorship, a system of freedoms and guarantees for citizens and courts wielding supreme authority to create the new common legality”.

General Berenguer was greatly troubled while articulating his government because the two dynastic parties, the Liberal-Fusionist Party and the Conservative Party had ceased to exist following the six-year dictatorship, for they weren’t actual political parties but interest groups whose only objective was to hold power at a certain time, owing to the electoral fraud instituted by the cacique system. Most politicians refused to collaborate with Berenguer as individuals, so he could only count on the most reactionary sector of conservatism, headed by Gabino Bugallal. Additionally, Patriotic Union, the only political party of the dictatorship, which in 1930 turned into the National Monarchist Union and was losing members, didn’t support Berenguer’s government either because it opposed the Constitution. As a result, the Monarchy didn’t have at its disposal any political organizations capable of guiding the transition process.

Berenguer's policies did not improve the position of the Monarchy. The slow rate at which the new liberalizing policies were being implemented cast doubt on the government’s claimed objective of reestablishing “Constitutional normalcy”. As a result, the press began to call the new regime “dictablanda”, meaning “soft dictatorship”. During this time, some politicians of the two dynastic parties defined themselves as “monarchists without a King” (such as Ángel Ossorio y Gallardo) and others joined the Republican side (such as Miguel Maura and Niceto Alcalá-Zamora, both of whom founded the Liberal Republican Right).

José Ortega y Gasset published an article on 15 November 1930 in the newspaper El Sol titled "The Berenguer error". It had a significant repercussion and it concluded with the following line: “Spaniards, your State does not exist! Rebuild it! Delenda est Monarchia”.

== Loss of political and social support for the Monarchy ==
The events that occurred throughout 1930 indicated that the return to the pre-1923 situation was not possible, because the Monarchy had become isolated. Sectors of society that had always supported the Monarchy, such as business owners, withdrew their support because they didn't trust its capacity to end the turmoil. The Monarchy also lacked the support of the middle class (the Church’s influence in this sector of society was being displaced by democratic and socialist ideas), and intellectuals and university students clearly publicized their rejection of the King.

One of the few groups that supported the Monarchy was the Catholic Church (which was fond of the Monarchy, as it reestablished its traditional position in society), but the Church was on the defensive due to the growth of republican and democratic ideals in the country. Another source of politica support for the Monarchy was the Army, although some sectors of this institution were abandoning their support for the King. In the words of Juliá Santos, “Perhaps the Army in itself would never participate in a conspiracy against the Monarchy but neither would it do anything to save the throne, and there weren't few military personnel that hurriedly collaborated with the anti-monarchic conspirators”.

== The prime of Republicanism and the Pact of San Sebastián ==
The social changes that had occurred in the previous thirty years did not help the reestablishment of the Restoration period's political system This reality, along with the public's association of the Dictatorship with the Monarchy, can explain the rapid growth of Republicanism in the cities. Thus, in this fast politization process, the lower and middle urban classes were convinced that the Monarchy signified despotism, and Democracy signified a Republic. According to Juliá Santos, in 1930, “the hostility against the Monarchy spread like an unstoppable hurricane in meetings and demonstrations throughout Spain”; “people began to cheerfully make for the streets, under any pretext, to praise the Republic”. The Republican cause also had the support of the intellectuals that formed the Group at the Service of the Republic, led by José Ortega y Gasset, Gregorio Marañón and Ramón Pérez de Ayala). On 17 August 1930, the Pact of San Sebastián was signed in a meeting organized by Republican Alliance. Apparently, (as no written account of the meeting was produced) the parts agreed to follow a strategy that put an end to King Alfonso XIII’s Monarchy and proclaim the Second Spanish Republic. According to an official note, the following people and groups assisted the meeting: Republican Alliance; Alejandro Lerroux of the Radical Republican Party, Manuel Azaña of Republican Action Group; Marcelino Domingo, Álvaro de Albornoz and Ángel Galarza of the Radical Socialist Republican Party; Niceto Alcalá-Zamora and Miguel Maura of the Liberal Republican Right; Manuel Carrasco Formiguera of Catalan Action; Matías Mallol Bosch of Republican Action of Catalonia; Jaume Aiguader of Catalan State and Santiago Casares Quiroga of the Galician Republican Federation. The meeting was also individually assisted by Indalecio Prieto, Felipe Sánchez Román and Eduardo Ortega y Gasset, brother of José Ortega y Gasset. Gregorio Marañón could not assist the meeting but sent “an enthusiastic letter of adherence”.

In October 1930, the Pact was joined in Madrid by two socialist organizations, PSOE and UGT, with the purpose of organizing a general strike followed by a military insurrection that would cast the Monarchy into “the archives of History”, as was said in the manifesto published in mid-December 1930. In order to coordinate the action, a “Revolutionary Committee” was formed, composed of Niceto Alcalá-Zamora, Miguel Maura, Alejandro Lerroux, Diego Martínez Barrio, Manuel Azaña, Marcelino Domingo, Álvaro de Albornoz, Santiago Casares Quiroga and Luis Nicolau d’Olwer, the nine representing the Republican faction, and Indalecio Prieto, Fernando de los Ríos and Francisco Largo Caballero, the three representing the Socialist faction. Meanwhile, the CNT continued reorganizing itself (although after the lifting of its ban it was only allowed to reconstitute itself at the provincial level) and, in accordance with its left-libertarian and “anti-political” program, did not participate in the republican-socialist alliance, and thus continued to act as a revolutionary leftist anti-establishment party.

== First failed attempt against the Monarchy ==
The Republican-Socialist Revolutionary Committee, presided by Alcalá-Zamora, which had its meetings at the Ateneo de Madrid, orchestrated a military insurrection, supported in the streets by a general strike. The use of violence to achieve power and overthrow a regime had been legitimized by the preceding coup that brought the Dictatorship. Nevertheless, the general strike was never called, and the military proclamation failed because captains Fermín Galán and Ángel García Hernández initiated the revolt in the Jaca garrison on December 12, three days before the established date. These events are known as the “Jaca uprising”, and the two insurgent captains were subjected to a summary military tribunal and executed. This mobilized public opinion in favor of the memory of the two “martyrs” of the yearned Republic.

== Admiral Aznar’s government and the fall of the Monarchy ==
Despite the failure of the Revolutionary Committee’s efforts to bring about the Republic, and even though its members were either detained, in exile or in hiding, General Berenguer felt compelled to reestablish the validity of Article 13 of the 1876 Constitution, which recognized the public freedoms of expression and association, and to call for general elections on 1 March 1931 with the objective of “constituting a Parliament which, along with the Courts of the last period [Primo de Rivera’s dictatorship], reestablishes the functioning of the co-sovereign forces in their entirety [the King and the Courts], as they are the axis of the Constitution of the Spanish Monarchy”. Thus, this was not a constituent assembly, nor was it an establishment of courts capable of reforming the Constitution. As a result, the announcement received no support, not even within the monarchists of the old Restoration parties. Berenguer’s failure compelled Alfonso XIII to look for his replacement. On 11 February he called the Catalanist leader Francesc Cambó to his Palace, having already become acquainted with him in a meeting in London the previous year. On 13 February 1931 King Alfonso XIII ended General Berenguer’s dictablanda and named Admiral Juan Bautista Aznar new president. At the time Aznar was sardonically described as “from the Moon politically and, from Cartagena geographically”, due to his minor political importance. Alfonso XIII had previously offered the post to liberal Santiago Alba and the “constitutionalist” conservative Rafael Sánchez Guerra, but both declined the nomination, with Sánchez Guerra having visited the imprisoned members of the Revolutionary Committee to ask them to join his Cabinet but receiving the refusal of all of them, with Miguel Maura telling him: “We have nothing to do or say about the Monarchy”. Aznar formed a government of “monarchical concentration” that was composed of leaders of the old liberal and conservative dynastic parties, as the King only accepted the presence of those who were “loyal to his person”, such as the Count of Romanones, Manuel García Prieto, Gabriel Maura Gamazo son of Antonio Maura, and Gabino Bugallal. The Cabinet was also joined by a member of the Regionalist League, Joan Ventosa, with the objective, as Cambó explained a year later, of “obtaining for Catalonia’s cause what couldn’t be achieved until then”. For Santiago Alba, it was a government for the “palace serfdom”.: “let us not be fooled once again by the heir of Ferdinand VII”, said Alba. The King trusted the government’s capacity to solve the situation, as Cambó certified in a personal meeting with him on 24 February: “I found him living in the best of worlds, oblivious to the weakness of the government, which was the base of his support”. Aznar’s new government proposed a new electoral calendar: municipal elections would be held first on 12 April, followed by Court elections which would “have a Constituent character”, so that they could proceed to the “revision of the faculties of the State’s Powers and the precise delimitation of the area of each” (in other words, reducing the Crown’s prerogatives) and to “an adequate solution to the problem of Catalonia”. On 20 March, during the electoral campaign, a drumhead court-martial against the Revolutionary Committee that orchestrated the failed civil-military movement was heard. The trial turned into a display of Republican will, and all of the accused were set free.

Everyone saw the 12 April 1931 municipal elections as a plebiscite on the Monarchy. Therefore, when it became known that the republican-socialist candidacies had won in 41 of 50 province capitals, the Revolutionary Committee publicized an announcement stating that the election results had been “unfavorable to the Monarchy [and] favorable to the Republic”, and announced its intention to “act with energy and swiftness in order to give immediate effect to [the] aspirations [of that majoritarian, longing and juvenile Spain] by implementing the Republic”. On Tuesday 14 April, the Republic was proclaimed from the balconies of city halls that were occupied by the new councilors, and King Alfonso XIII was forced to leave the country. On the same day, the Revolutionary Committee turned into the First Provisional Government of the Second Spanish Republic.

== Cabinets ==
=== Government of general Berenguer ===
Council of Ministers, 30 January 1930 – 18 February 1931
Function	Image	Name and surname	Tenure	Political party
President of the Council of Ministers		Dámaso Berenguer	30 January 1930 – 18 February 1931	Military
Minister of the Army		Dámaso Berenguer	30 January 1930 – 18 February 1931	Military
Minister of the Navy		Salvador Carvia Caravaca	30 January 1930 – 18 February 1931	Military
Minister of Labor and Protection		Pedro Sangro and Ros de Olano	30 January 1930 – 18 February 1931	Independent
Minister of State		Jacobo Fitz-James Stuart y Falcó	30 January 1930 – 18 February 1931	Independent
Minister of Public Instruction and Fine Arts		Jacobo Fitz-James Stuart y Falcó	30 January – 24 February 1930	Independent
Minister of Public Instruction and Fine Arts		Elias Tormo	24 February 1930 – 18 February 1931	Conservative
Minister of Justice and Religion		Jose Estrada y Estrada	18 January – 25 November 1930	Conservative
Minister of Grace and Justice		Joaquin de Montes y Jovellar	25 November 1930 – 18 February 1931	Conservative
Minister of Finance		Manuel de Argüelles	18 January – 20 August 1930	Conservative
Minister of Finance		Julio Wais San Martin	20 August 1930 – 18 February 1931	Conservative
Minister of Governance		Enrique Marzo Balaguer	30 January – 25 November 1930	Military
Minister of Governance		Leopoldo Matos y Massieu	25 November 1930 – 18 February 1931	Conservative
Minister of Development		Leopoldo Matos y Massieu	30 January – 25 November 1930	Conservative
Minister of Development		Jose Estrada y Estrada	25 November 1930 – 18 February 1931	Conservative
Minister of National Economy		Manuel de Argüelles	30 January – 3 February 1930 (interim)	Conservative
Minister of National Economy		Julio Wais San Martin	3 February – 20 August 1930	Conservative
Minister of National Economy		Luis Rodriguez de Viguri	20 August 1930 – 18 February 1931	Conservative

=== Government of admiral Aznar ===
Council of Ministers, 18 February – 14 April 1931
Function	Image	Holder	Time	Political party
President of the Council of Ministers		Juan Bautista Aznar	18 February – 14 April 1931	Military
Minister of the Army		Dámaso Berenguer	18 February – 14 April 1931	Military
Minister of State		Count of Romanones	18 February – 14 April 1931	Liberal
Minister of Grace and Justice		Manuel Garcia Prieto	18 February – 14 April 1931	Liberal
Minister of Finance		Juan Ventosa y Calvell	18 February – 14 April 1931	Regionalist League
Minister of the Navy		Jose Rivera Alvarez de Canero	18 February – 14 April 1931	Military
Minister of Governance		Marquis of Hoyos	18 February – 14 April 1931	Military
Minister of Development		Juan de la Cierva y Peñafiel	18 February – 14 April 1931	Conservative
Minister of Public Instruction and Fine Arts		Jose Gascón y Marin	18 February – 14 April 1931	Conservative
Minister of Labor and Protection		Gabriel Maura Gamazo	18 February – 14 April 1931	Conservative
Minister of National Economy		Gabino Bugallal	18 February – 14 April 1931	Conservative

== See also ==
- Fall of the dictatorship of Primo de Rivera
