= Julio Wais San Martín =

Spanish politician and minister of National Economy (1878–1954)

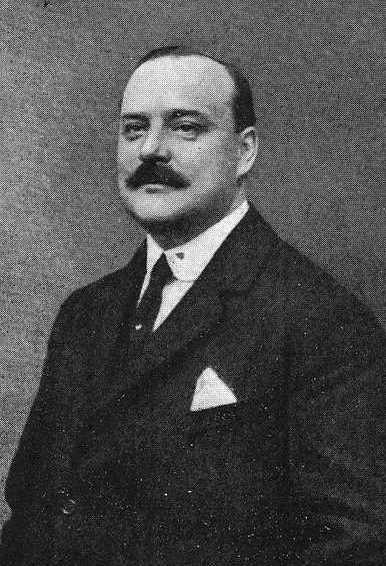
- Julio Wais San Martín in 1920

Minister of Finance of Spain
- In office August 20, 1930 – February 18, 1931
- Monarch: Alfonso XIII
- Prime Minister: Dámaso Berenguer
- Preceded by: Manuel Argüelles Argüelles
- Succeeded by: Juan Ventosa

Minister of National Economy of Spain
- In office February 3, 1930 – August 20, 1930
- Monarch: Alfonso XIII
- Prime Minister: Dámaso Berenguer
- Preceded by: Manuel Argüelles Argüelles
- Succeeded by: Luis Rodríguez de Viguri

Minister of Grace and Justice of Spain
- In office July 7, 1921 – August 14, 1921
- Monarch: Alfonso XIII
- Prime Minister: Manuel Allendesalazar
- Preceded by: Vicente Piniés Bayona
- Succeeded by: José Francos Rodríguez

Under Secretary of the Ministry of Governance
- In office July 23, 1919 – May 14, 1920
- Monarch: Alfonso XIII
- Prime Minister: Joaquín Sánchez de Toca; Manuel Allendesalazar; Eduardo Dato
- Minister of Governance: Manuel de Burgos y Mazo; Joaquín Fernández Prida; Francisco Bergamín García
- Preceded by: Joaquín Montes y Jovellar
- Succeeded by: Juan José Ruano de la Sota
- In office September 7, 1920 – July 8, 1921
- Monarch: Alfonso XIII
- Prime Minister: Eduardo Dato; Gabino Bugallal (as acting); Manuel Allendesalazar
- Minister of Governance: Gabino Bugallal
- Preceded by: Juan José Ruano de la Sota
- Succeeded by: Juan Cervantes y Sanz de Andino

Member of the Congress of Deputies for A Coruña's Pontedeume district
- In office December 3, 1912 – September 15, 1923

Personal details
- Born: August 29, 1878 A Coruña, Spain
- Died: April 16, 1954 (aged 75) Madrid, Spanish State
- Party: Conservative
- Occupation: Politician

Julio Wais San Martín (August 29, 1878 – April 16, 1954) was a Spanish politician and minister of National Economy during the Dámaso Berenguer period following the dictatorship of Primo de Rivera.
