= Eduardo Cobián =

Spanish politician

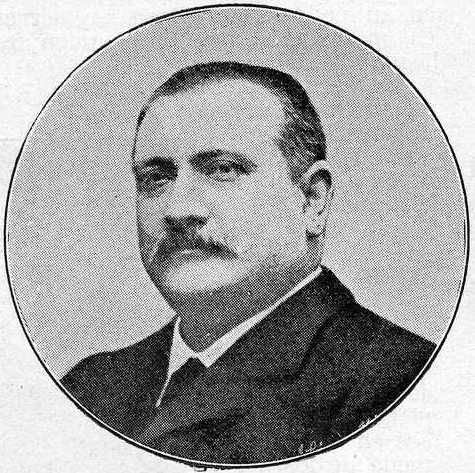

Minister of Finance of Spain
- In office 9 February 1910 – 3 April 1911
- Monarch: Alfonso XIII
- Prime Minister: José Canalejas
- Preceded by: Juan Alvarado y del Saz
- Succeeded by: Tirso Rodrigáñez

Minister of the Navy of Spain
- In office 6 January 1905 – 23 June 1905
- Monarch: Alfonso XIII
- Prime Minister: Marcelo Azcárraga; Raimundo Fernández-Villaverde
- Preceded by: Marcelo Azcárraga
- Succeeded by: Miguel Villanueva
- In office 20 July 1903 – 5 December 1903
- Monarch: Alfonso XIII
- Prime Minister: Raimundo Fernández-Villaverde
- Preceded by: Joaquín Sánchez de Toca
- Succeeded by: José Ferrándiz y Niño

Governor of the Bank of Spain
- In office 6 April 1911 – 12 November 1913
- Monarch: Alfonso XIII
- Prime Minister: José Canalejas; Manuel García Prieto (as interim); Count of Romanones; Eduardo Dato
- Minister of Finance: Tirso Rodrigáñez; Juan Navarro Reverter; Félix Suárez Inclán; Gabino Bugallal
- Preceded by: Tirso Rodrigáñez
- Succeeded by: Lorenzo Domínguez Pascual

Personal details
- Born: Eduardo Cobián y Roffignac; 19 March 1857 Pontevedra, Spain
- Died: 20 April 1918 (aged 61) Madrid, Spain
- Party: Liberal
- Other political affiliations: Conservative; Villaverdists; Democratic

Eduardo Cobián y Roffignac (19 March 1857 – 20 April 1918) was a Spanish politician who served as minister during the Spanish Restoration.
