= Juan Camacho =

Juan Camacho may refer to:

- Juan Antonio Camacho de Saavedra (1669–1740), master architect of Córdoba, Spain
- Juan Francisco Camacho (1824–1896), Spanish statesman and financier
- Juan Camacho (Bolivian athlete) (born 1959), Bolivian retired long-distance runner
- Juan Camacho (Mexican athlete) (born 1972), Mexican retired long-distance runner
- Juanjo Camacho (born 1980), Spanish footballer
