= Juan de la Concha Castañeda =

Spanish lawyer, journalist and politician (1818–1903)

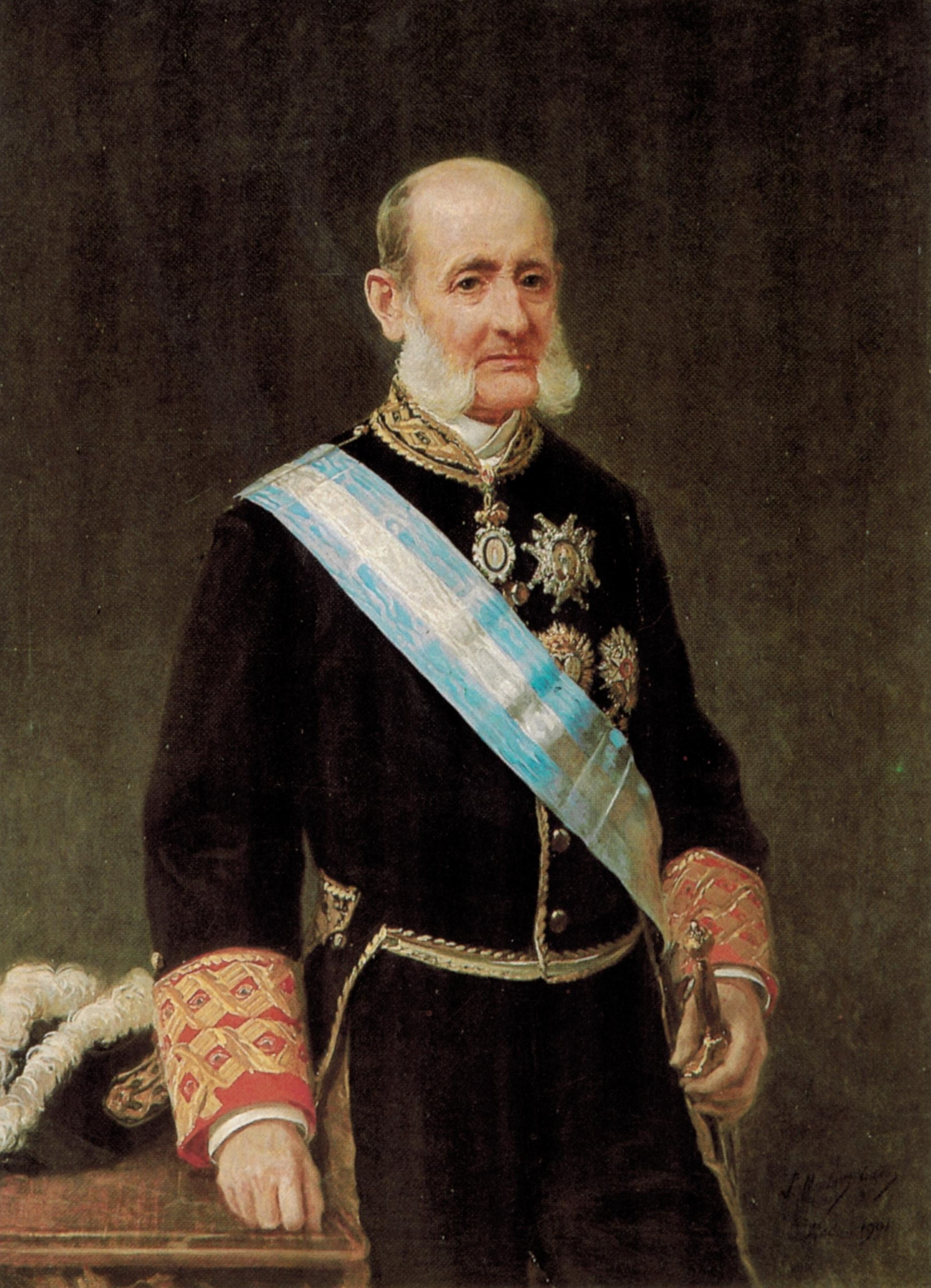
- 1901 portrait of Concha

Minister of Finance
- In office 23 November 1891 – 11 December 1892
- Prime Minister: Antonio Cánovas del Castillo
- Preceded by: Fernando Cos-Gayón

Personal details
- Born: 29 August 1818 Plasencia, Spain
- Died: 30 August 1903 (aged 85) Madrid, Spain
- Party: Conservative Party
- Spouse: Teresa María Alcalde (m. 1841)
- Education: Complutense University of Madrid

Juan de la Concha Castañeda (1818–1903) was a Spanish lawyer and politician. He served as the minister of finance between 23 November 1891 and 11 December 1892 and governor of the Bank of Spain between January 1900 and April 1901.

== Early life and education ==
Concha was born in Plasencia on 29 August 1818. He studied Latin and philosophy at the Conciliar Seminary of Plasencia. He studied law at the University of Salamanca, but not completed his studies there. He graduated from the Complutense University of Madrid in 1841 receiving a degree in law.

== Career and activities ==
Following his graduation Concha worked as lawyer until 1844 when his public career began. He became a judge in the Court of Pastrana in April 1844 which he held until July 1845 and then a provincial counselor in Guadalajara in 1845. Next he worked at the accounting department of the Ministry of Interior in Madrid.

Concha published articles in the newspaper El Siglo and was an editorial member of the newspapers El Faro Nacional and La Justicia from 1850 to 1868.

Concha was elected as a deputy representing the province of Cáceres in 1863. He was reelected as a deputy in the 1867 elections. He joined the newly founded Conservative Party and was elected as a senator for Cáceres in 1876. He served at the Senate until 1886 when he became a member of the Real Academia de Ciencias Morales y Políticas.

Concha served as the prosecutor of the Supreme Court in 1890. He was appointed minister of finance on 23 November 1891, replacing Fernando Cos-Gayón in the post. Concha served in the cabinet led by Antonio Cánovas del Castillo until 11 December 1892. Concha's last public post was the governor of the Bank of Spain which he was appointed in January 1900, succeeding Antonio María Fabié in the post. He was in office until April 1901 when Pío Gullón e Iglesias was named as the governor of the Bank of Spain. Then Concha retired from public service and politics.

== Personal life and death ==
Concha married Teresa María Alcalde in 1841. He died in Madrid on 30 August 1903.

=== Awards ===
Concha was awarded the Grand Cross of the Order of Isabella the Catholic and the Commander of the Order of Charles III on 16 February 1877.
