= Ángel Urzaiz =

Spanish writer, politician and lawyer (1856–1926)

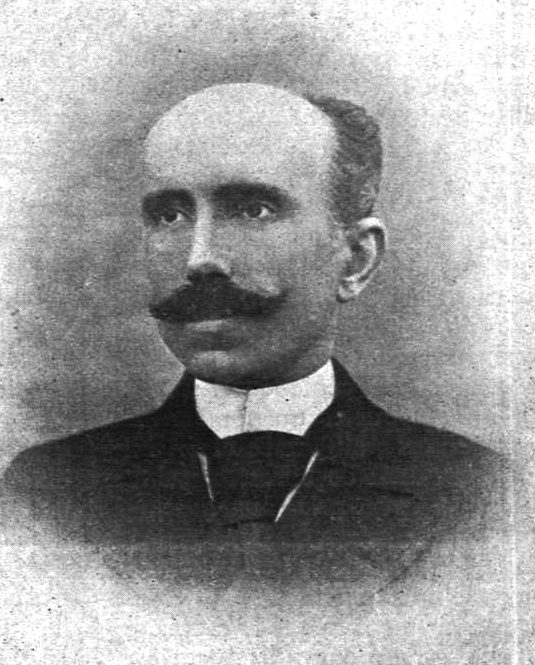

Minister of Finance of Spain
- In office 9 December 1915 – 25 February 1916
- Prime Minister: Count of Romanones
- Preceded by: Gabino Bugallal
- Succeeded by: Miguel Villanueva
- In office 23 June 1905 – 18 July 1905
- Prime Minister: Eugenio Montero Ríos
- Preceded by: Antonio García Alix
- Succeeded by: José Echegaray
- In office 6 March 1901 – 19 March 1902
- Prime Minister: Práxedes Mateo Sagasta
- Preceded by: Manuel Allendesalazar
- Succeeded by: Tirso Rodrigáñez

Personal details
- Born: Ángel María Urzaiz y Cuesta; 21 February 1856 El Puerto de Santa María, Spain
- Died: 1 May 1926 (aged 70) Madrid, Spain
- Party: Liberal
- Other political affiliations: Democratic

Ángel María Urzaiz y Cuesta (21 February 1856 – 1 May 1926) was a Spanish politician who served as Finance minister during the Spanish Restoration.
