= Aranda Ministry =

The Aranda Ministry was a Spanish government headed by Pedro Pablo Abarca de Bolea, Count of Aranda, which briefly led the country from 28 February to 15 November 1792. It was intended as a stop-gap administration between the outgoing Floridablanca Ministry and the rising star and royal favourite Manuel Godoy.

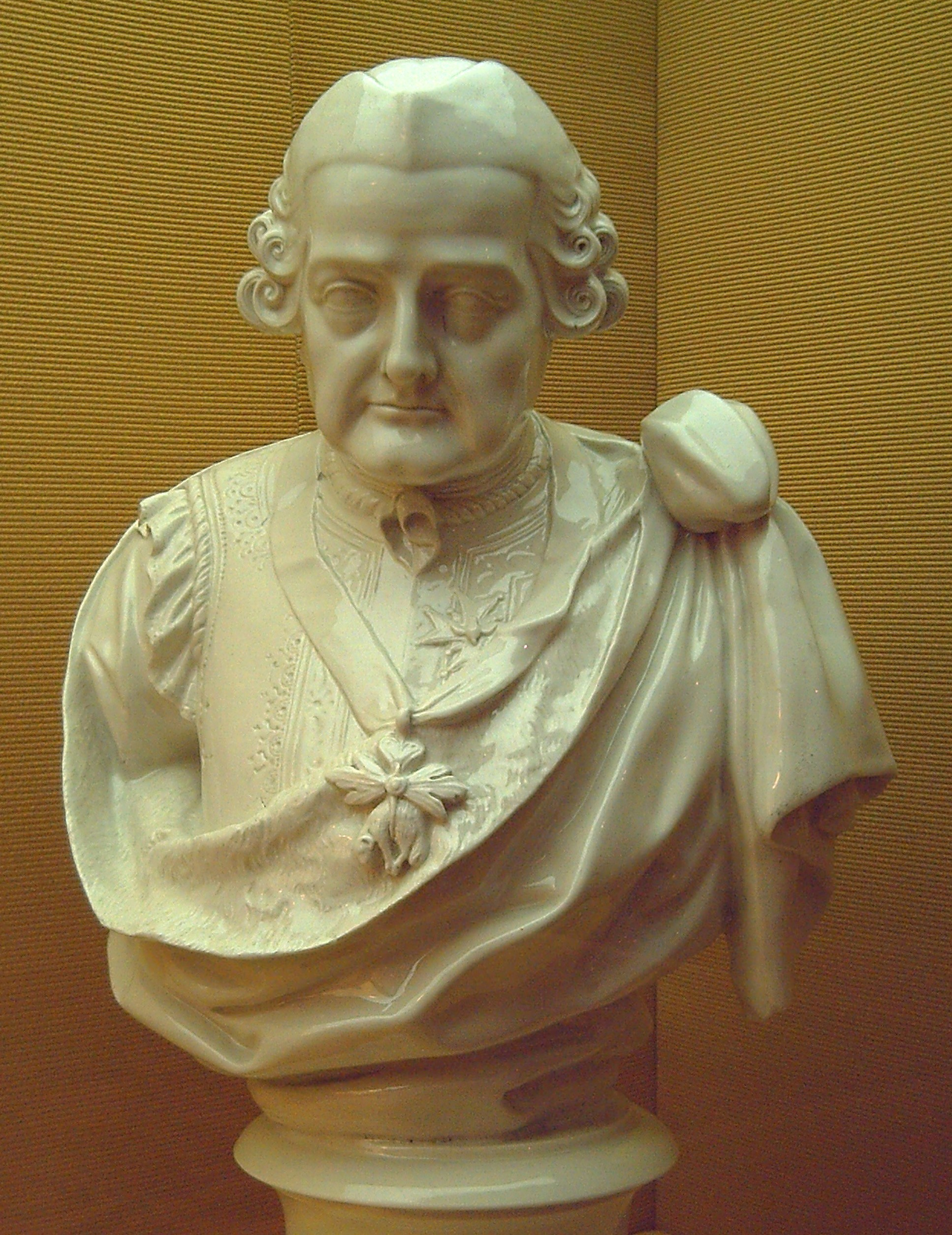
18th century porcelain bust of Aranda (M.A.N., Madrid).

Aranda was an experienced diplomat who had extensive experience in Paris where the French Revolution had recently broken out. He had his own radical ideas for reform of the Spanish Empire, which would have seen it formed into a looser commonwealth. However, his government ended before he could propose or implement any of these schemes. In November 1792 he handed over power to Manuel Godoy who was seen by the King as being better fitted to leading Spain in such turbulent times than either Floridablanca or Aranda.

== Cabinet ==
28 February – 15 November 1792
Portfolio	Image	Holder	Term
First Secretary of State (PM)		Count of Aranda	28 February – 15 November 1792 (interim)
Secretary of State for War		Manuel Negrete de la Torre	28 February – 15 November 1792
Secretary of State for Navy		Antonio Valdés y Fernández Bazán	28 February – 15 November 1792
Secretary of State for the Treasury		Diego de Gardoqui	28 February – 15 November 1792
Secretary of State for Grace and Justice		Antonio Aniceto Porlier	28 February – 13 July 1792
Secretary of State for Grace and Justice		Pedro Antonio Acuña y Malvar	13 July – 15 November 1792

== Bibliography ==
- Hughes, Robert. Goya. Vintage, 2004.
- Simms, Brendan. Three Victories and a Defeat: The Rise and Fall of the First British Empire. Penguin Books 2008.
