= Carvajal Ministry =

Spanish government between 1746 and 1754

The Carvajal Ministry was a Spanish government which served between 1746 and 1754 during the reign of Ferdinand VI of Spain headed by José de Carvajal.

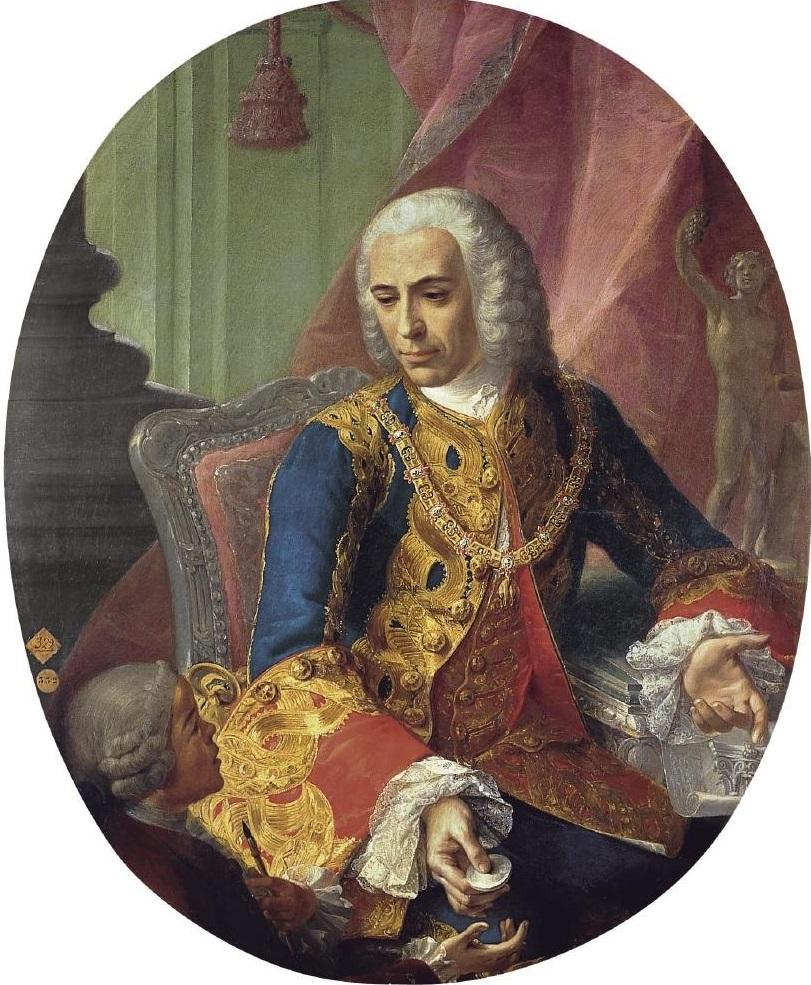
José de Carvajal

Contrasting with the previous anti-British emphasis of the Spanish government Carvajal was neutral and sought much better relations, a view shared by King Ferdinand. The government negotiated and signed the Anglo-Spanish Treaty of Madrid in 1750, resolving the issues that had taken them into the War of Jenkins' Ear.

The Ministry fell when Carvajal died in 1754, and was replaced by the short-lived Hueścar Ministry.

== Cabinet ==
4 December 1746 – 8 April 1754
Portfolio	Image	Holder	Term
First Secretary of State (PM)		José de Carvajal y Lancáster	4 December 1746 – 8 April 1754
Secretary of State for War		Marquess of Ensenada	4 December 1746 – 8 April 1754
Secretary of State for Navy and the Indies		Marquess of Ensenada	4 December 1746 – 8 April 1754
Secretary of State for the Treasury		Marquess of Ensenada	4 December 1746 – 8 April 1754
Secretary of State for Ecclesiastical Affairs, Justice and Jurisdiction		Marquess of Villarías	4 December 1746– 3 January 1747
Secretary of State for Ecclesiastical Affairs, Justice and Jurisdiction		Marquess of Villarías	3 January – 8 October 1747 (interim)
Secretary of State for Ecclesiastical Affairs, Justice and Jurisdiction		Alonso Muñiz y Caso Osorio	8 October 1747 – 8 April 1754
