= Luis Rodríguez de Viguri =

Spanish politician

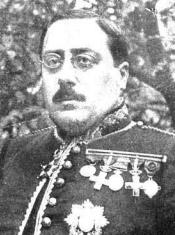
- Luis Rodríguez in 1922

Minister of Development of Spain
- In office December 4, 1922 – December 7, 1922
- Monarch: Alfonso XIII
- Prime Minister: Miguel Primo de Rivera
- Preceded by: Manuel Argüelles Argüelles
- Succeeded by: Rafael Gasset

Minister of the National Economy of Spain
- In office August 20, 1930 – February 18, 1931
- Monarch: Alfonso XIII
- Prime Minister: Dámaso Berenguer
- Preceded by: Julio Wais San Martín
- Succeeded by: Juan Ventosa

Minister of Supplies of Spain
- Interim
- In office May 5, 1920 – May 8, 1920
- Monarch: Alfonso XIII
- Prime Minister: Eduardo Dato
- Preceded by: Francisco Terán Morales
- Succeeded by: Position abolished
- Interim
- In office 12 December – 15 December 1919
- Monarch: Alfonso XIII
- Prime Minister: Manuel Allendesalazar
- Preceded by: Fernando Sartorius Chacón
- Succeeded by: Francisco Terán Morales

Deputy of the Cortes Republicanas for Lugo Province
- In office 1933 – 1936

Deputy of the Cortes for Lugo
- In office 1918 – September 15, 1923

Personal details
- Born: Luis Rodríguez de Viguri y Seoane; October 16, 1881 Santiago de Compostela, Spain
- Died: December 12, 1945 (aged 64) Madrid, Spanish State
- Party: Conservative (until 1933); Agrarian (by 1933)
- Occupation: Lawyer & politician

Luis Rodríguez de Viguri y Seoane (October 16, 1881 - December 12, 1945) was a Spanish politician and minister of National Economy during the Dámaso Berenguer period following the dictatorship of Primo de Rivera.
