= Tirso Rodrigáñez =

Spanish politician (1853–1935)

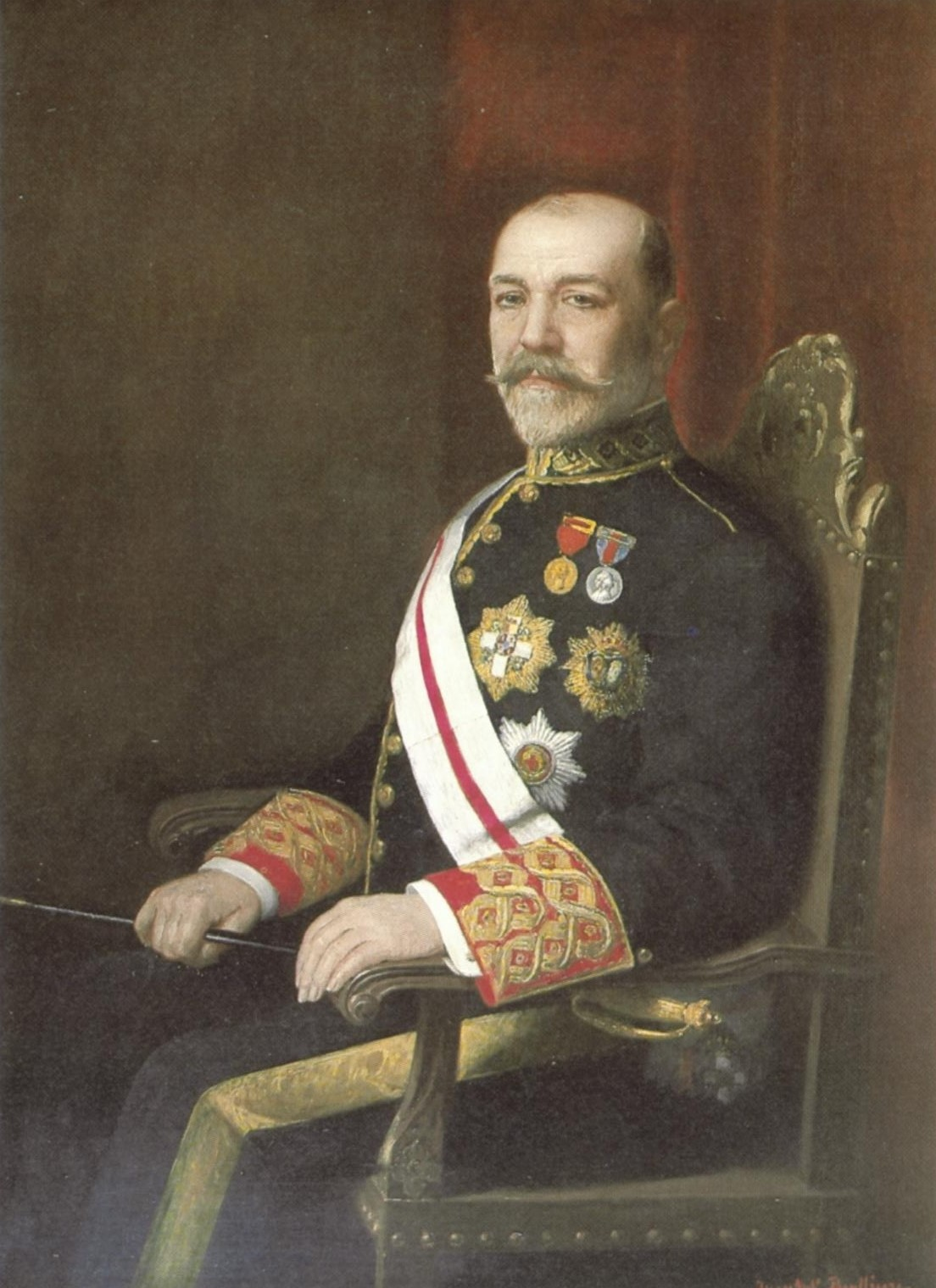

Minister of Finance of Spain
- In office 3 April 1911 – 12 March 1912
- Prime Minister: José Canalejas
- Preceded by: Eduardo Cobián
- Succeeded by: Juan Navarro Reverter
- In office 19 March 1902 – 15 November 1902
- Prime Minister: Práxedes Mateo Sagasta
- Preceded by: Ángel Urzaiz
- Succeeded by: Manuel de Eguilior y Llaguno

Personal details
- Born: Tirso Timoteo Rodrigáñez y Mateo Sagasta; 24 January 1853 Logroño, Spain
- Died: 2 August 1935 (aged 82) Madrid, Spain
- Party: Liberal

Tirso Timoteo Rodrigáñez y Mateo Sagasta (24 January 1853 – 2 August 1935) was a Spanish politician who served as Finance minister during the Spanish Restoration.
