= Antonio Barrera de Irimo =

Spanish politician (1929–2014)

Second Deputy Prime Minister of Spain
- In office 4 January 1974 – 30 October 1974
- Prime Minister: Carlos Arias Navarro
- Preceded by: Office established
- Succeeded by: Rafael Cabello de Alba

Minister of Finance of Spain
- In office 12 June 1973 – 30 October 1974
- Prime Minister: Luis Carrero Blanco; Carlos Arias Navarro
- Preceded by: Alberto Monreal Luque
- Succeeded by: Rafael Cabello de Alba

Personal details
- Born: Antonio Barrera de Irimo; 10 May 1929 Ribadeo, Galicia, Kingdom of Spain
- Died: 24 September 2014 (aged 85) Madrid, Spain
- Party: Nonpartisan (National Movement)

Antonio Barrera de Irimo (10 May 1929 – 24 September 2014) was a Spanish politician who served as Minister of Finance of Spain between 1973 and 1974 and as Second Deputy Prime Minister in 1974, during the Francoist dictatorship.
