= José Canga Argüelles =

Spanish statesman

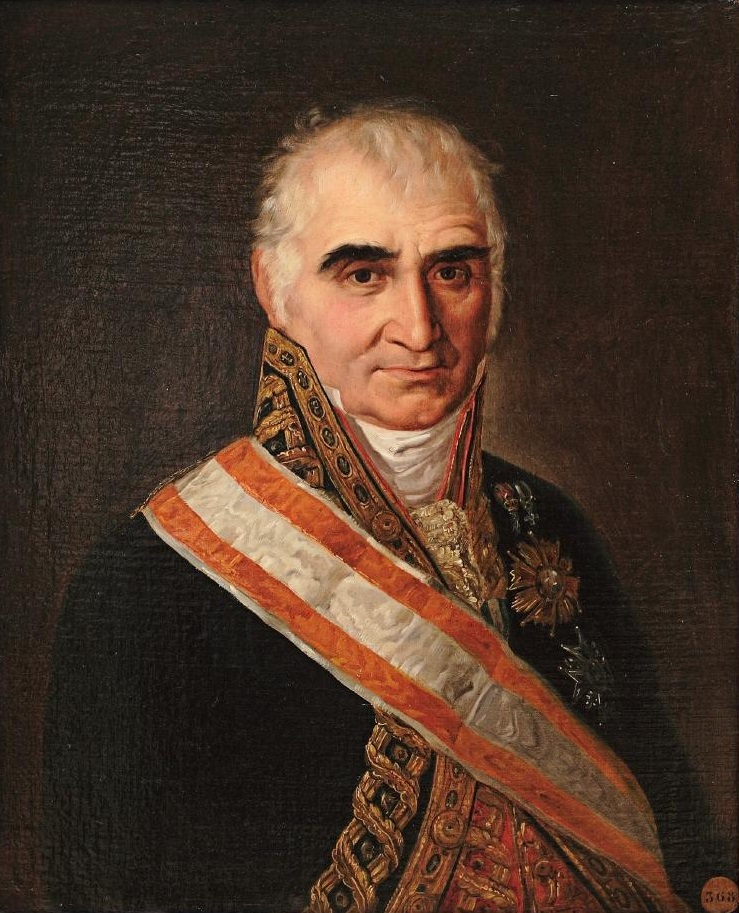
José Canga Argüelles. José Cabana. (Real Academia de Bellas Artes de San Fernando).

José Canga Argüelles (17 July 1770 – 2 December 1843) was a Spanish statesman.

== Biography ==
He took an active part in the Spanish resistance to Napoleon in a civil capacity and was an energetic member of the cortes of 1812. On the return of the Bourbon line in 1814, Canga-Argüelles was sent into exile in the province of Valencia.

On the restoration in 1820 of the constitution of 1812, he was appointed minister of finance. He continued at this post until the spring of 1821, distinguishing himself by the zeal and ability with which he sought to reform the finances of Spain. It was high time; for the annual deficit was greater than the entire revenue itself, and landed and other property was, to an unheard-of extent, monopolized by the priests.

The measures he proposed had been only partially enforced, when the action of the king with regard to the ministry, of which he was a member, obliged him to resign. Thereafter, as a member of the Moderate Liberal party, Canga-Argüelles advocated constitutional government and financial reform, until the overthrow of the constitution in 1823, when he fled to England. He did not return to Spain until 1829, and did not again appear in public life, being appointed keeper of the archives at Simancas.

== Works ==
Canga-Argüelles is the author of three works:

- Elementos de la Ciencia de Hacienda (Elements of the Science of Finance), London, 1825
- Diccionario de Hacienda (Dictionary of Finance), London, 1827
- Observaciones sobre la guerra de la Peninsula (Observations on the Peninsular War), in which he endeavoured to show that his countrymen had taken a far more effective part in the national struggle against the French than English historians were willing to admit.
