= Rafael Cabello de Alba =

Spanish politician (1925–2010)

Second Deputy Prime Minister of Spain
- In office 30 October 1974 – 12 December 1975
- Prime Minister: Carlos Arias Navarro
- Preceded by: Antonio Barrera de Irimo
- Succeeded by: Manuel Fraga

Minister of Finance of Spain
- In office 30 October 1974 – 12 December 1975
- Prime Minister: Luis Carrero Blanco; Carlos Arias Navarro
- Preceded by: Antonio Barrera de Irimo
- Succeeded by: Juan Miguel Villar Mir

Personal details
- Born: Rafael Cabello de Alba y Gracia; 31 August 1925 Montilla, Kingdom of Spain
- Died: 4 May 2010 (aged 84) Madrid, Spain
- Party: Nonpartisan (National Movement)

Rafael Cabello de Alba y Gracia (31 August 1925 – 4 May 2010) was a Spanish politician who served as Minister of Finance and Second Deputy Prime Minister of Spain between 1974 and 1975, during the Francoist dictatorship.
