= Alberto Monreal Luque =

Spanish economist and politician

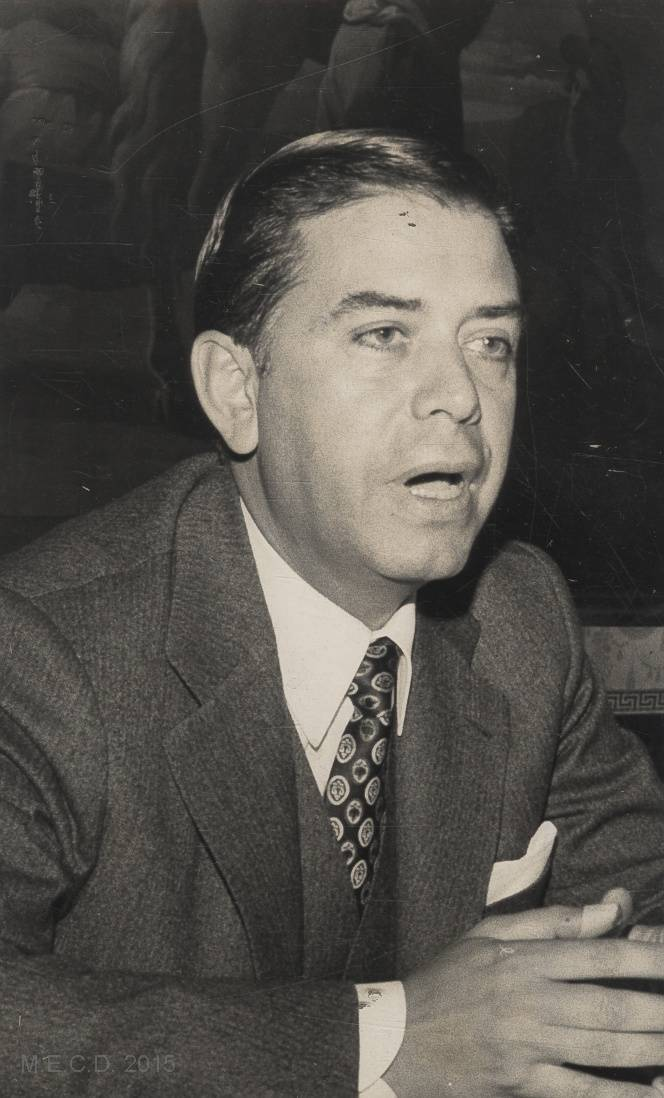

Minister of Finance of Spain
- In office 30 October 1969 – 9 June 1973
- Prime Minister: Francisco Franco
- Preceded by: Juan José Espinosa San Martín
- Succeeded by: Antonio Barrera de Irimo

Personal details
- Born: Alberto Monreal Luque; 18 November 1926 Madrid, Kingdom of Spain
- Died: 4 August 2014 (aged 87) Madrid, Spain
- Party: Nonpartisan (National Movement)

Alberto Monreal Luque (18 November 1926 – 4 August 2014) was a Spanish politician who served as minister of Finance of Spain between 1969 and 1973, during the Francoist dictatorship.
