= Juan José Espinosa San Martín =

Spanish politician

Minister of Finance of Spain
- In office 8 July 1965 – 30 October 1969
- Prime Minister: Francisco Franco
- Preceded by: Mariano Navarro Rubio
- Succeeded by: Alberto Monreal Luque

Personal details
- Born: Juan José Espinosa San Martín; 30 June 1918 Madrid, Kingdom of Spain
- Died: 14 January 1982 (aged 63) Madrid, Spain
- Party: Opus Dei (National Movement)

Juan José Espinosa San Martín (30 June 1918 – 14 January 1982) was a Spanish politician who served as Minister of Finance of Spain between 1965 and 1969, during the Francoist dictatorship. He was a member of the Opus Dei.
