= Gabino Bugallal Araújo =

Spanish politician

The Most Excellent Gabino Bugallal
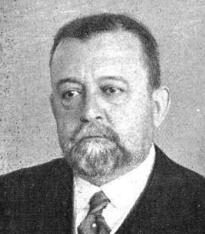

Prime Minister of Spain
- Acting
- In office 8 – 12 March 1921
- Monarch: Alfonso XIII
- Preceded by: Eduardo Dato
- Succeeded by: Manuel Allendesalazar

President of the Congress of Deputies of Spain
- In office 15 March 1922 – 5 April 1923
- Preceded by: José Sánchez Guerra
- Succeeded by: Melquíades Álvarez

Minister of Public Instruction and Fine Arts of Spain
- In office 20 July – 5 December 1903
- Monarch: Alfonso XIII
- Prime Minister: Raimundo Fernández-Villaverde
- Preceded by: Manuel Allendesalazar
- Succeeded by: Lorenzo Domínguez Pascual

Minister of Finance of Spain
- In office 27 October 1913 – 9 December 1915
- Monarch: Alfonso XIII
- Prime Minister: Eduardo Dato
- Preceded by: Félix Suárez Inclán
- Succeeded by: Ángel Urzaiz
- In office 11 June – 3 November 1917
- Monarch: Alfonso XIII
- Prime Minister: Eduardo Dato
- Preceded by: Santiago Alba Bonifaz
- Succeeded by: Juan Ventosa
- In office 20 July 1919 – 5 May 1920
- Monarch: Alfonso XIII
- Prime Minister: Joaquín Sánchez de Toca; Manuel Allendesalazar
- Preceded by: Juan de la Cierva y Peñafiel
- Succeeded by: Lorenzo Domínguez Pascual

Minister of Grace and Justice of Spain
- In office 5 May – 1 September 1920
- Monarch: Alfonso XIII
- Prime Minister: Eduardo Dato; Himself (as interim); Manuel Allendesalazar
- Preceded by: Pablo Garnica
- Succeeded by: Mariano Ordóñez García

Minister of Governance of Spain
- In office 1 September 1920 – 13 March 1921
- Monarch: Alfonso XIII
- Prime Minister: Eduardo Dato; Manuel Allendesalazar
- Preceded by: Francisco Bergamín y García
- Succeeded by: Rafael Coello y Oliván

Minister of National Economy of Spain
- In office 18 February – 14 April 1931
- Monarch: Alfonso XIII
- Prime Minister: Juan Bautista Aznar
- Preceded by: Luis Rodríguez de Viguri
- Succeeded by: Marcelino Domingo Sanjuán

Personal details
- Born: Gabino Bugallal y Araújo; 19 February 1861 Ponteareas, Pontevedra, Spain
- Died: 30 September 1932 (aged 71) Paris, France

Gabino Bugallal Araújo, 2nd Count of Bugallal (19 February 1861, in Ponteareas – 30 June 1932, in Paris) was a Spanish politician and Prime Minister of Spain in 1921. Bugallal was a member of the Conservative Party in Spain.

== Career ==
He held several important political offices between the years of 1905 and 1921, such as 3 times Minister of the Treasury, Minister of Education, Minister of Justice, Minister of the Interior and Minister of Industry.

Between 8 March and 12 March 1921 he was Prime Minister of Spain after the murder of Eduardo Dato, until he was replaced by Manuel Allendesalazar y Muñoz de Salazar. After that, from 1922 to 1923, he was President of the Congress of Deputies. He was finally Minister of Economy in 1931.

== See also ==
=== Related articles ===
- A Parda (Pontevedra)
