= Juan Francisco Camacho =

Spanish statesman and financier (1824–1896)

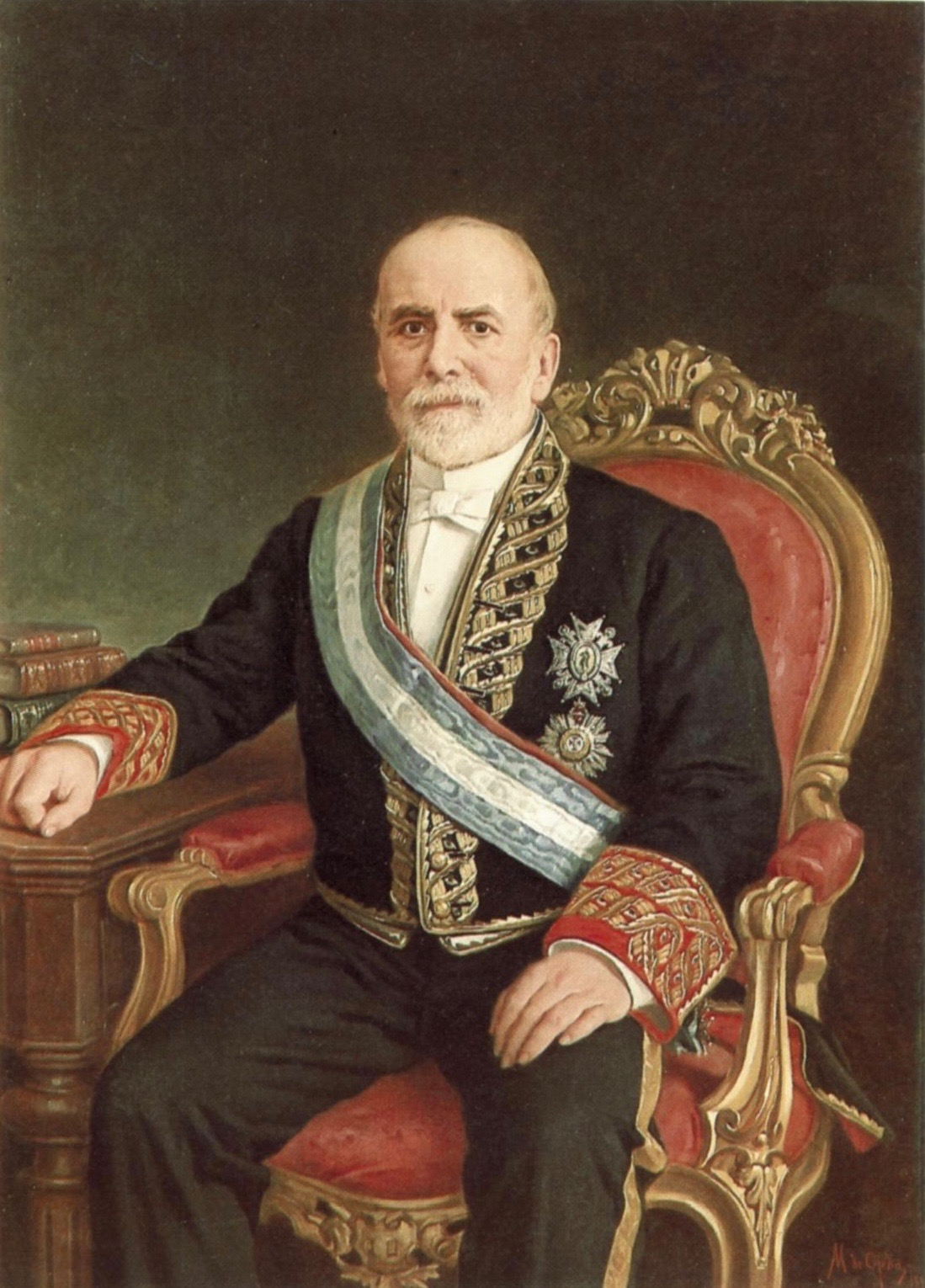
Juan Francisco Camacho

Juan Francisco Camacho (1824 – January 23, 1896) was a Spanish statesman and financier.

== Life ==
He was born in Cádiz. The first part of his life was devoted to mercantile and financial pursuits at Cádiz and then in Madrid, where he managed the affairs of and liquidated a mercantile and industrial society to the satisfaction and profit of the shareholders. In 1837 he became a captain in the national militia, in 1852 Conservative deputy in the Cortes for Alcoy, in 1853 secretary of congress, and was afterwards elected ten times deputy, twice senator and life senator in 1877.

Camacho took a prominent part in all financial debates and committees, was offered a seat in the Mon cabinet of 1864, and was appointed under-secretary of state finances in 1866 under Cánovas and Leopoldo O'Donnell, Duke of Tetuan. After the revolution of 1868 he declined the post of minister of finance offered by Marshal Serrano, but served in that capacity in 1872 and 1874 in Sagasta's cabinets.

When the restoration took place, Camacho sat in the Cortes among the dynastic Liberals with Sagasta as leader, and became finance minister in 1881 at a critical moment when Spain had to convert, reduce, and consolidate its treasury and other debts with a view to resuming payment of coupons. Camacho drew up an excellent budget and collected taxation with a decidedly unpopular vigour.

A few years later Sagasta again made him finance minister under the regency of Queen Christina, but had to sacrifice him when public opinion very clearly pronounced against his too radical financial reforms and his severity in collection of taxes. He was for the same reasons unsuccessful as a governor of the Tobacco Monopoly Company. He then seceded from the Liberals, and during the last years of his life he affected to vote with the Conservatives, who made him Governor of the Bank of Spain. He died in Madrid on 23 January 1896.

== Bibliography ==
- Miguel Martorell Linares y Francisco Comín: "Francisco Camacho: un liberal templado", in Francisco Comín, Pablo Martín Aceña & Rafael Vallejo (eds.): La Hacienda por sus ministros. La etapa liberal de 1845 a 1899, Zaragoza, Prensas Universitarias de Zaragoza, 2006, pp. 369–405, ISBN 84-7733-779-9
