= Fernando Cos-Gayón =

Spanish journalist and politician

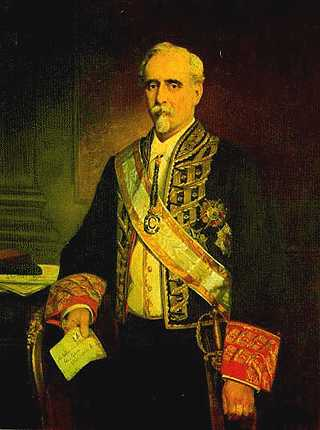
Fernando Cos-Gayón

Fernando Cos-Gayón y Pons (May 27, 1825 - December 20, 1898) was a Spanish journalist and politician.
