= Francisco Bergamín y García =

Spanish lawyer, economist and politician

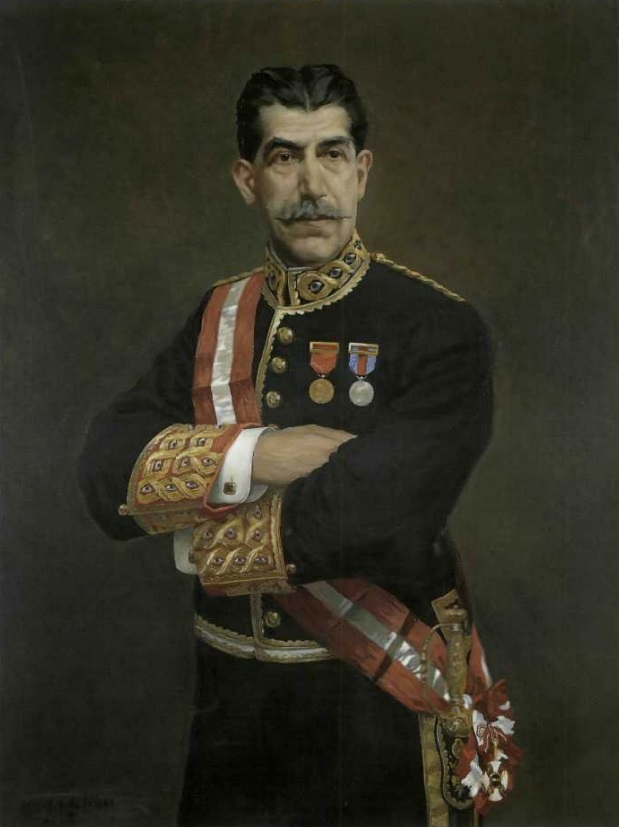
Francisco Bergamín, by Luis Herreros de Tejada.

Francisco Bergamín y García (6 October 1855, in Campillos, Spain – 13 February 1937, in Madrid, Spain) was a Spanish lawyer, economist and politician who served as Minister of State in 1922, during the reign of King Alfonso XIII.

== Sources ==
- Personal dossier of D. Francisco Bergamín. Spanish Senate
