= Manuel Argüelles Argüelles =

Spanish politician and lawyer

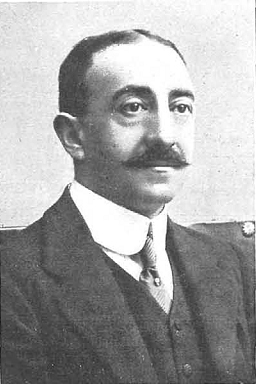

Manuel Argüelles Argüelles (10 November 1875 in Madrid – 1945) was a Spanish politician and lawyer. He served as Minister of Finance and Minister of Public Works during the reign of Alfonso XIII. He later served as Minister of Finance during the dictatorship of Miguel Primo de Rivera.

== Life ==
He began his career in the Liberal-Conservative Party, obtaining a seat in the Congress of Deputies (Spain's lower house) representing the province of Oviedo in successive elections between 1907 and 1923.

He was Minister of Finance in the governments under Eduardo Dato and Manuel Allendesalazar, between March 13 and July 7, 1921, a post to which he would return between January 30 and August 20, 1930 under the government of Dámaso Berenguer. He was also Minister of Public Works between March 8 and December 4, 1922 in the cabinet under José Sánchez Guerra.
