= Guillermo de Osma =

Spanish diplomat, politician, and art patron

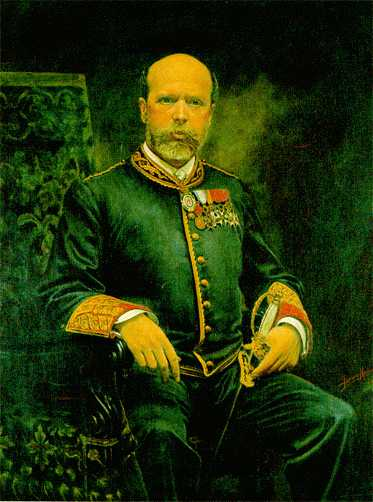

Minister of Finance
- In office 25 January 1907 – 23 February 1908
- Monarch: Alfonso XIII
- Prime Minister: Antonio Maura
- Preceded by: Juan Navarro Reverter
- Succeeded by: Cayetano Sánchez Bustillo
- In office 5 December 1903 – 16 December 1904
- Monarch: Alfonso XIII
- Prime Minister: Antonio Maura
- Preceded by: Augusto González Besada
- Succeeded by: Tomás Castellano

Personal details
- Born: Guillermo Joaquín de Osma y Scull; 24 January 1853 Havana, Captaincy General of Cuba
- Died: 1922 (aged 68–69)
- Occupation: Diplomat, politician and art patron
- Known for: Founding the Instituto Valencia de Don Juan and endowing the De Osma Studentship at the University of Oxford

Guillermo Joaquín de Osma y Scull, Count of Valencia de Don Juan (24 January 1853 – 1922) was a Spanish diplomat, politician and art patron. Born in Cuba and educated at the Sorbonne and the University of Oxford, he served twice as Spain's Minister of Finance and as president of the Council of State. He was the first president of the Board of Trustees of the Alhambra, a member of the Royal Academy of Fine Arts of San Fernando and the Royal Academy of Moral and Political Sciences.

A prominent Hispanist and patron of scholarship, he founded with his wife Adelaida Crooke y Guzmán, the Instituto Valencia de Don Juan in Madrid and endowed the De Osma Studentship at the University of Oxford, where he had been the first Spaniard to study following the Universities Tests Act 1871.

== Early life and education ==
Osma was born to Juan Ignacio de Osma Ramírez de Arellano and Emilia Rosa Scull y Andouin on 24 January 1853 in Havana, then part of the Captaincy General of Cuba, into a family of statesmen with transatlantic connections.

His paternal grandfather served as a judge in the Viceroyalty of Peru and married María Josefa Rosa Ramírez de Arellano y Baquíjano, niece of the Peruvian intellectual José de Baquíjano y Carrillo. His maternal grandfather, Joseph Scull, was a merchant born in Philadelphia who settled in Havana in 1798 and became a Spanish subject in 1812; Scull's family owned sugar plantations throughout western and central Cuba. Although Osma was not aristocratic by birth, he became socially linked to the Spanish nobility through marriage and cultural life.

After leaving Cuba for France, Osma studied at the Sorbonne in Paris. Following the Universities Tests Act 1871, which removed barriers for non-Anglicans to study at the universities of Oxford, Cambridge and Durham, Osma became the first Spaniard to study at the University of Oxford, matriculating at Pembroke College on 27 May 1871 at the age of eighteen. He graduated BA in 1874 and proceeded to MA in 1879. During this period, he was attached to the Spanish Embassy in Paris. He obtained a first-class degree in historia moderna (modern history).

== Diplomatic and political career ==
In 1877, Osma entered the Spanish diplomatic service, marking the beginning of a public career that later extended into parliamentary politics. He was a deputy for Monforte de Lemos and a senator for life.

He served twice as Spain's Minister of Finance in governments headed by Prime Minister Antonio Maura in the period from 5 December 1903 to 16 December 1904 and in the period from 25 January 1907 to 23 February 1908, and later held the post of president of the Council of State. In parallel with his governmental roles, he was appointed the first president of the Board of Trustees of the Alhambra, reflecting his involvement in cultural administration at the national level. In 1906, Osma was elected to the Real Academia de Ciencias Morales y Políticas, where he delivered his formal reception address on economic policy.

From 1919 until his death, Osma was a member of the Senate of Spain. His career also received international recognition, notably through his award of the Legion of Honour by France.

== Cultural patronage and legacy ==
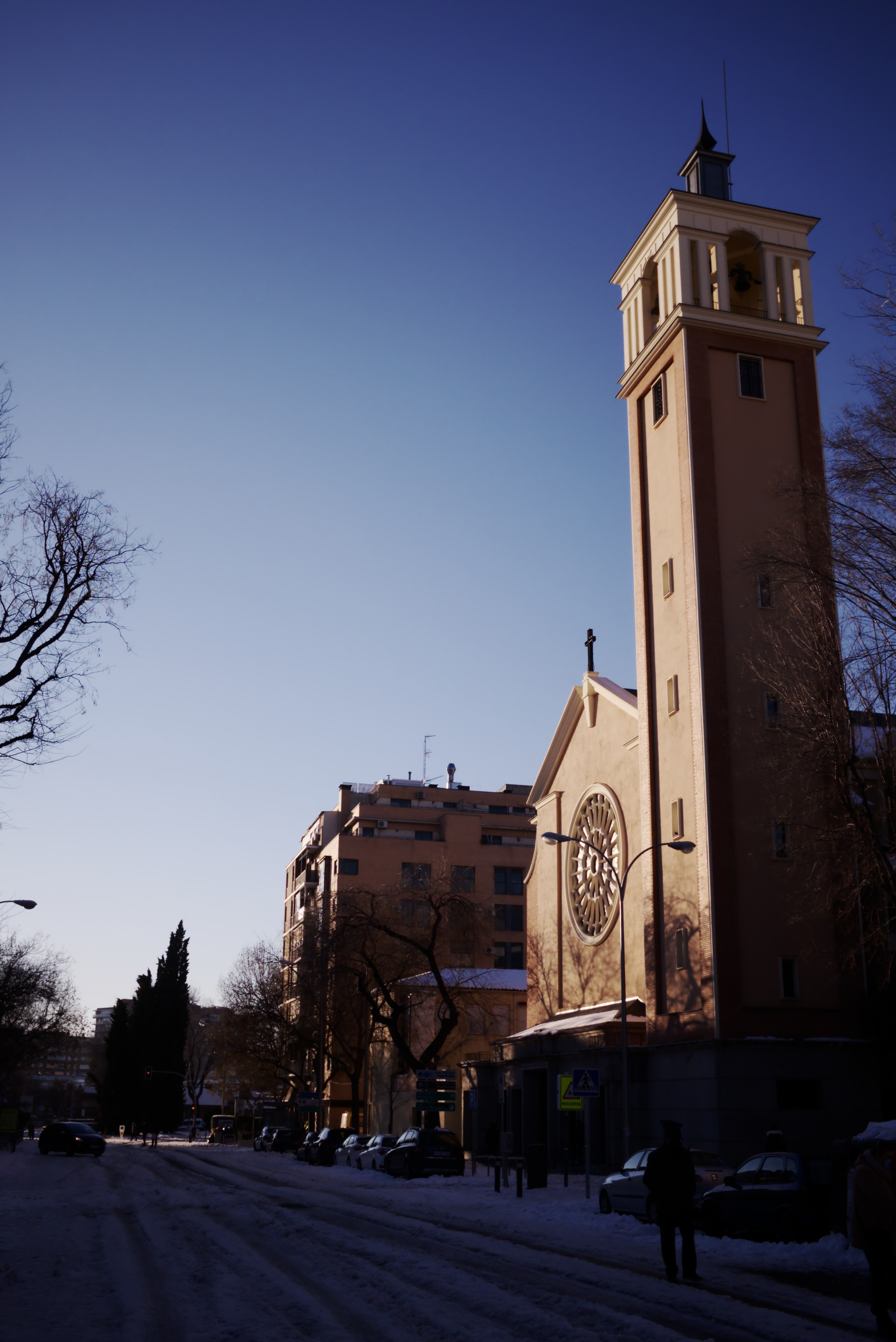
The Guillermo de Osma street in Madrid.

Osma was also an active scholar of Spanish decorative arts. He published archival studies on jet carving traditions and on medieval ceramic workshops in Manises, Paterna and Valencia. Among his most substantial works was a major illustrated catalogue on Spanish jet (azabache), examining amulets, pilgrimage objects and craft traditions associated with Santiago de Compostela.

Osma maintained close intellectual ties with American scholar and collector Archer Milton Huntington, with whom he corresponded primarily in English. A member of the Royal Academy of Moral and Political Sciences, he developed a particular scholarly interest in decorative arts, including ceramics, ivories, textiles and metalwork.

Osma founded with his wife, Adelaida Crooke y Guzmán, daughter of the 24th Countess of Valencia de Don Juan, the Instituto Valencia de Don Juan in Madrid in 1916; turning their residence into a museum and research centre housing their extensive art and manuscript collections. Adelaida's father, Juan Bautista Crooke y Navarrot, was a scholar and archaeologist, a member of the Royal Academy of History, and later director of the Royal Armoury of Madrid. His collections formed the initial core of those later inherited by his daughter. Osma and Adelaida decided to establish a foundation to preserve their collection and make it accessible to a select group of researchers.

On 15 March 1916 a notary formally established the Institute; the Board of Trustees included Prime minister Antonio Maura, scholar Miguel Asín Palacios, Spanish peer Jacobo Fitz-James Stuart y Falcó, American philanthropist and scholar Archer Milton Huntington and British archaeologist Sir Charles Hercules Read.

In 1920, Osma endowed the De Osma Studentship at Oxford to support research in Spanish art and history; it was the university's first modern endowment, as well as their first Spanish studentship. The De Osma scholarship has supported distinguished scholars including the medievalist Anthony Luttrell and the historian Henry Kamen.

In 1991 the Galería Guillermo de Osma, named in his honour, opened in Madrid with an exhibition of Uruguayan artists Joaquín Torres-García and Rafael Barradas.

== See also ==
- Instituto Valencia de Don Juan
- De Osma Studentship

== Literature ==
- Urquijo y Goitia, José Ramón de (2008). Gobiernos y ministros españoles en la edad contemporánea (2ª ed.). ISBN 978-84-00-08737-1.
