= Nigel H. Jones =

British historian, journalist and biographer

Nigel Jones (born 1951) is a British journalist and biographer.

== Early life ==
Born in Woking, Surrey, he spent childhood in Surrey, Sussex, Kent and rural Yorkshire. He was educated at schools in the Isle of Wight and North Wales. His journalistic career began on local newspapers in Hertfordshire and the Cambridge Evening News where he was Crown Court correspondent. He then spent almost two years in Germany, learning the language, studying the history and working in factories in Karlsruhe, Reutlingen and Berlin.

== Career ==
In the 1980s he worked for the Press Association news agency in London and as an editor with BBC and Independent Radio News IRN.

His first book, The War Walk: A Journey along the Western Front (1983), was inspired by his father, Frank Jones (1890-1970), a Great War veteran. For the book he walked along the trench lines of the Western front, interviewing more than 30 veterans of the conflict. Among these was the German author and war hero Ernst Jünger. His stay with Jünger inspired his second book, Hitler's Heralds: the story of the Freikorps 1918-1923 (1987. Reissued in 2004 as A Brief History of the birth of the Nazis).

His third book was inspired by the discovery in 1988 of an archive of letters, papers and manuscripts of the English novelist and playwright Patrick Hamilton (1904-1962) which were bequeathed to him by Hamilton's sister-in-law, Aileen Hamilton, and used in his biography of Hamilton, Through a Glass Darkly (1990 : reissued 2008).

In 1991 Jones moved to Vienna, Austria, where he joined the Austrian Broadcasting Corporation (ORF) and broadcast worldwide on Radio Austria International. It was at this time that his only stage play End of the Night, based on the life of French novelist Louis-Ferdinand Celine, was produced at Brighton's Pavilion Theatre in November 1991.

Returning to England in 1995, he worked as a freelance journalist for The Guardian and The Spectator while writing his biography of the poet Rupert Brooke, Life, Death and Myth (1999).

He was deputy editor of History Today magazine (1999-2000) and reviews editor of BBC History Magazine (2000-2003).

His next book was a brief life of Britain's Fascist leader Sir Oswald Mosley, Mosley, published by Haus in 2004.

His recent publications include a history of the plots to assassinate Hitler, Countdown to Valkyrie, published by Frontline Books in January 2009, and Tower: An Epic History of the Tower of London, published by Hutchinson in 2011 and released in the US in 2012 by St. Martin's Press.

Jones has written for most of Britain's national newspapers, including The Times and The Sunday Times, the Daily Telegraph and Sunday Telegraph; and the Daily Mail and Daily Express. He reviews books regularly for The Literary Review.

He initiated and appeared in the BBC film Journey to Hell (2003) about the war poet Wilfred Owen, and a BBC film biography of Patrick Hamilton (2004). He has also presented a BBC Radio Four portrait of Hamilton, Portrait in Black (2004), and a Radio Four documentary about the SS Lebensborn children's homes in Nazi Germany, Fountain of Life (2006).

Jones is a frequent contributor to the World Association of International Studies (WAIS) online discussion group, created by Ronald Hilton of Stanford University.

Jones also conducts adult and schools tours of the Western Front, "In the Footsteps of the war poets".

== Personal life ==
Jones unsuccessfully stood for election as the Member of Parliament for the Eastbourne constituency in the 2015 United Kingdom General Election with the United Kingdom Independence Party.

== Publications ==
=== Author ===
- The War Walk: A Journey along the Western Front (1984).
- Hitler's Heralds: the Story of the Freikorps 1918-1923 (1987). (Reissued in as A Brief History of the Birth of the Nazis (2004).
- Through a Glass Darkly: the Life of Patrick Hamilton (1992).
- Rupert Brooke: Life, Death & Myth (1999).
- Mosley (2004).
- Countdown to Valkyrie: The inside story of the July Plot against Hitler (2009).
- The Tower: An Epic History of the Tower of London (2011).
- Kitty's Salon: Sex, Spying and Surveillance in the Third Reich (2023). Co-authored with Urs Brunner and Julia Schrammel. Originally published in German in 2020 under the title Kittys Salon: Legenden, Fakten, Fiktion - Kitty Schmidt und ihr berüchtigtes Nazi-Spionagebordell.

=== Contributed to ===
- "Maydays: the Premiership of Lord Halifax" to Hitler Triumphant: Alternative Decisions of World War II A counter-factual history edited by Peter Tsouras (Greenhill Books) 2006.
- 1001 Days That Shaped The World (Century). 2009
