= George Alfred Kolkhorst =

George Alfred Magee ('Colonel') Kolkhorst (1897–1958) was an Oxford don, first a lecturer and then Reader in Spanish.

== Life ==
Kolkhorst was the son of an engineer, and was brought up in Chile. His family then moved to Portugal. In the later part of World War I he was in Galicia, Spain on official work.

A member of Exeter College, Oxford, he was the first to receive the De Osma Studentship and was able to study in Madrid at the Instituto Valencia of Don Juan. On his return, he was appointed University Lecturer in Spanish in 1921 and Reader in Spanish in 1931, holding office until his death in 1958. He used to wear a cube of sugar on a string around his neck "to sweeten my conversation", and was universally known among Oxford undergraduates as "Colonel" Kolkhorst — allegedly because he looked and behaved so utterly unlike a colonel. His home was at Yarnton Manor and he held salons in Beaumont Street.

His friendship with John Betjeman led to his inclusion in Summoned by Bells, Betjeman's verse autobiography. A poem about Kolkhorst's death is included in Betjeman's posthumous collection Harvest Bells (pp. 99–101).
