= Allegory of the Camaldolese Order =

Subject of two paintings by El Greco

- Alegoría de la Orden de los Camaldulenses (Spanish)
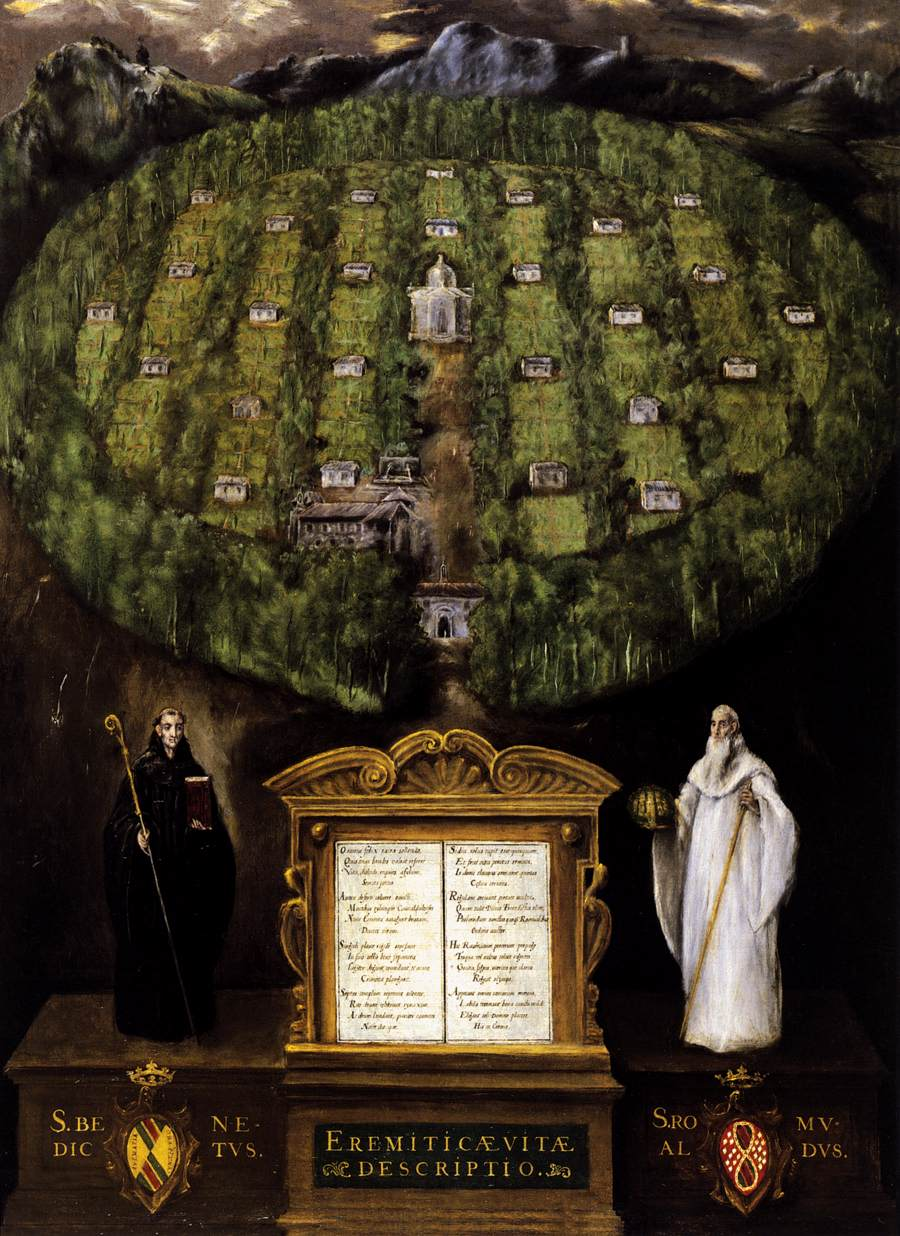
- Artist: El Greco
- Year: ca. 1600
- Medium: oil on canvas
- Dimensions: 124 x 90 cm (48.8 x 35.4 in)
- Location: Instituto Valencia of Don Juan, Madrid

Allegory of the Camaldolese Order is a composition by El Greco and his workshop that survives in two paintings, one at the Instituto Valencia de Don Juan in Madrid and the other at the Museo del Patriarca in Valencia. The paintings depict a bird's-eye view of the "ideal monastery" according to the Camaldolese, and were likely commissioned as part of Fray Juan de Castañiza's (c. 1545–1599) petition to Philip II in 1597 to establish the Benedictine monastic order in Spain.

== Analysis ==
Both of the paintings are nearly identical in composition, though the one held at the Instituto Valencia of Don Juan is on a slightly smaller canvas. In the mountainous landscape, within a circular forest clearing, are individual hermitages arranged into rows, with a central complex for group worship. In the foreground on either side of a tabernacle stand saints central to the foundation of the Camaldolese: Saint Benedict to the left, and Saint Romuald to the right. Romuald holds a model of the circular monastery complex in his hand. The tabernacle frames a poem in Latin praising Saint Romuald, and Latin text below identifies the image as a "Description of the Hermetical Life."

It is unlikely that El Greco had ever been to a Camaldolese monastery and he likely drew inspiration from other sources. Harold Wethey was among the first to note that the composition was likely derived from a print depicting the Holy Hermitage of Camaldoli in the mountains near Arezzo, Italy. Robert Byron and David Talbot Rice argued that the arrangement of the monastery resembles the depiction of the Holy City of Jerusalem in the Cretan School of post-Byzantine icon painting, in which El Greco was a master before he emigrated to Italy and Spain.

Allegory of the Camaldolese Order
- Alegoría de la Orden de los Camaldulenses (Spanish)
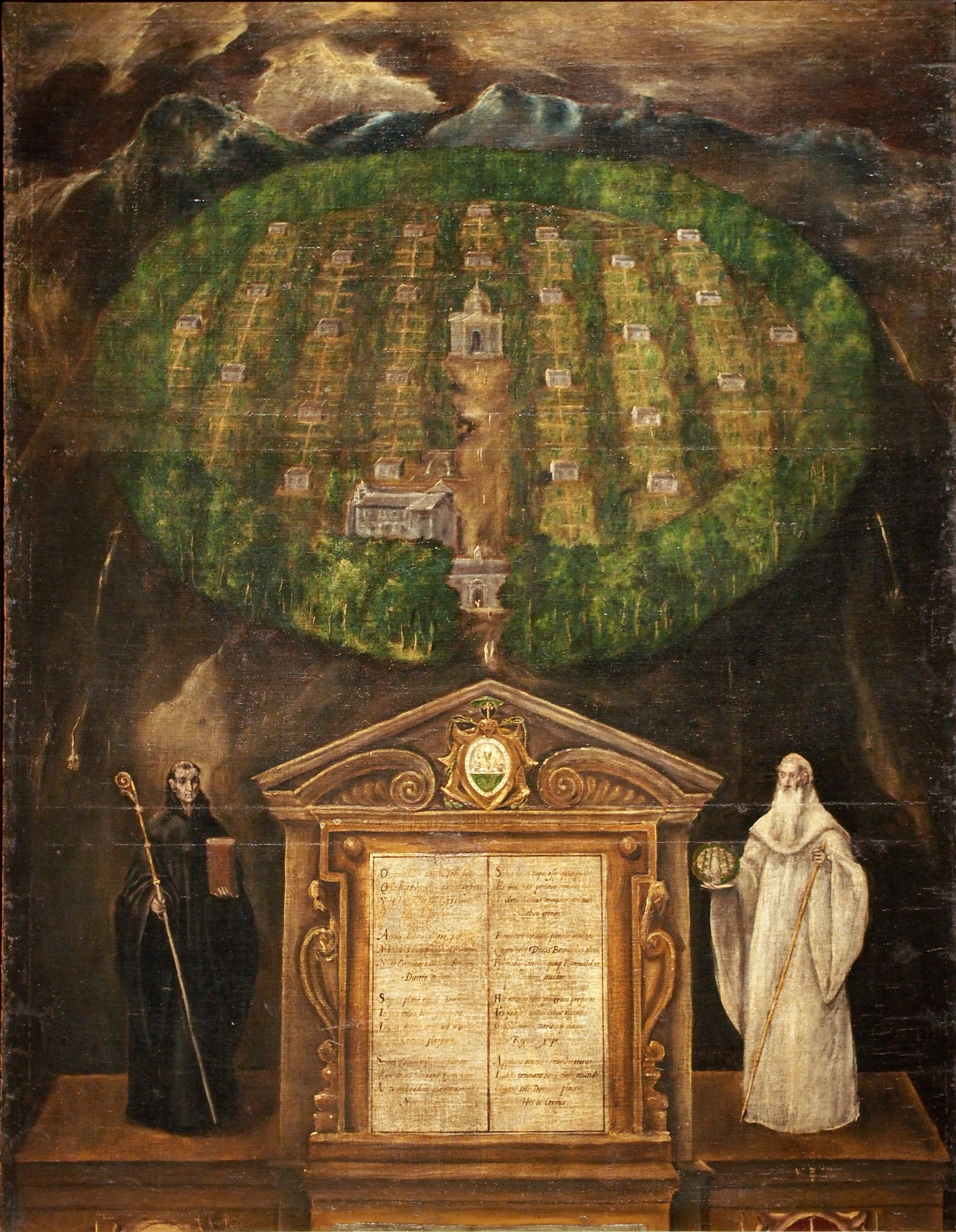
- Artist: El Greco
- Year: 1597
- Medium: oil on canvas
- Dimensions: 138 x 108 cm (54.3 x 42.5 in)
- Location: Museo del Partriarca, Valencia, Spain

== Patronage ==
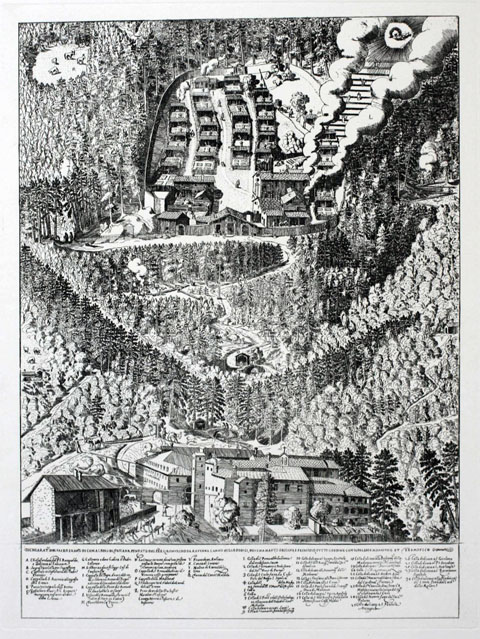
View of the Camaldolesian Community, ca. 1600, engraving,

The canvas held at the Instituto Valencia of Don Juan bears escutcheon of Mariana de Mendoza of Toledo and that of her husband Pedro Lasso de la Vega, Conde de los Arcos. The two were known to own eight original works by El Greco, as well as eighteen works depicting hermits. The Allegory of the Camaldolese, however, was probably the only painting that they expressly commissioned from El Greco, showing their commitment to Fray Juan de Castañiza's project and their continuing support of the artist. It is unknown who commissioned the painting now at the Museo del Patriarca, though it bears the arms of Juan de Ribera, Archbishop of Valencia and Patriarch of Antioch. Fernando Marías suggested it may have been a gift from Mariana and Pedro Lasso to Ribera rather than being a personal commission.

== See also ==
- List of works by El Greco
