= Forey =

Forey is a surname. Notable people with this surname include:

- Alan Forey (born 1933), reader emeritus in history at the University of Durham
- Connie Forey (born 1950), Canadian ice hockey player
- Élie Frédéric Forey (1804–1872), Marshal of France
- Lisa Forey (born 1977), Welsh lawn and indoor bowler

== See also ==
- Forey Duckett (born 1970), American football player
