= Peter Edward Lionel Russell =

British historian (1913-2006)

Sir Peter Edward Lionel Russell, FBA (24 October 1913 – 22 June 2006) was a British historian whose main area of study was Spain and Portugal in the medieval period.

== Early life and military ==
Born in Christchurch, New Zealand, on 24 October 1913, Russell moved to the UK at the age of 12 with his mother and brother Hugh. He received his schooling at Cheltenham College and studied French, Spanish and Portuguese as an undergraduate at Queen's College, Oxford, graduating with a First in 1935. Russell received the De Osma Studentship to study in Madrid. While in Spain Russell met Luis Buñuel and Federico García Lorca. His doctoral research focused on the Plantagenet involvement in the Iberian Peninsula and was guided by Maurice Powicke and V. H. Galbraith but was incomplete by the outbreak of war in 1939.

During the Spanish Civil War he undertook assignments in Spain for British Intelligence, this resulted in his arrest and expulsion in 1938. He served in the Intelligence Corps of the British Army during the Second World War serving in the Caribbean, West Africa and the Far East and reaching the rank of Lieutenant Colonel.

== Academic career ==
His first appointments were as college lecturer at St John's College, Oxford in 1937 and Queen's College Oxford in 1938. After resuming his academic work post war he was made a fellow of Queen's. In 1953 he became King Alfonso XIII Professor of Spanish Studies, a position he held until his retirement, and Director of Portuguese Studies.

He retired in 1981 and was made Doctor of Letters (DLitt) by Oxford University. He received honours from the Spanish, Portuguese and British governments being made commander of the order of Isabel la Católica in 1989, commander of the order of the Infante Dom Henrique in 1993 and being knighted in 1995. Four festschrifts have been published in his honour.

He is depicted in several novels by Javier Marías as the character Sir Peter Wheeler.

== Selected publications ==
- The English Intervention in Spain and Portugal in the Time of Edward III and Richard II, OUP 1955
- Cervantes, OUP 1985
- Portugal, Spain, and the African Atlantic, 1343-1490: chivalry and crusade from John of Gaunt to Henry the Navigator, Ashgate 1995
- Prince Henry ‘the Navigator’: a Life, Yale 2000
