= Anthony Luttrell =

British medieval historian (born 1932)

- Born: October 1932 (age 93–94)
- Occupations: Historian, academic, author
- Awards: Humboldt Research Award (1999–2000)

Academic background
- Education: University of Oxford (MA, D.Phil.)
- Thesis: Juan Fernandez de Heredia, Castellan of Amposta (1346–1377), Master of the Order of St. John at Rhodes (1377–1396) (1959)

Academic work
- Discipline: History; Medieval studies
- Sub-discipline: Medieval Mediterranean history, Knights Hospitaller, medieval Malta
- Institutions: Royal Holloway, University of London; University of Würzburg; University of Padua; Dumbarton Oaks; French National Centre for Scientific Research; Princeton University; Royal University of Malta; British School at Rome; University of Edinburgh; Swarthmore College
- Notable works: Studies on the Hospitallers after 1306: Rhodes and the West (2007); The Town of Rhodes 1306–1356 (2003)

Anthony Luttrell (born 1932) is a British medieval historian best known for his extensive research on the Knights Hospitaller and the history of the Order of St John in Rhodes and Malta during the fourteenth and fifteenth centuries.

Over a career spanning more than five decades, he has held teaching and research posts across Europe and North America, including at the University of Edinburgh, the British School at Rome, the Royal University of Malta and Princeton University. A prolific scholar, Luttrell has published more than 250 works, monographs, edited volumes, and collected studies that have shaped the modern understanding of the Hospitallers' political, social and cultural roles in the medieval Mediterranean.

His contributions have been recognised with major academic honours, including the Humboldt Research Award and the Prix Gustave Schlumberger of the Académie des Inscriptions et Belles-Lettres. A 2016 Festschrift, The Hospitallers, the Mediterranean and Europe highlighted his influence on crusader and Mediterranean historiography.

== Early life ==
Anthony Thornton Luttrell was born in October 1932. After graduating from Bryanston School in Dorset in 1951, Luttrell began his studies at Oriel College, Oxford. He graduated in 1954, spending his final year as a De Osma Student (Note: The De Osma Studentship is a prestigious scholarship available to members of the University of Oxford. It was established in 1920 by Guillermo J. de Osma, the first Spaniard to study at Oxford.) at the Instituto Valencia of Don Juan in Madrid. In 1955, he entered the Colegio Mayor Ximénez de Cisneros at Madrid University, then pursued further studies from 1956 to 1958 at the British School at Rome, a British interdisciplinary research centre, as the Rome Scholar in Medieval studies. (Note: The Rome Scholarship in Medieval Studies was founded in 1931 to offer students the possibility of conducting research in history, antiquities or literature of some period between A.D. 300 and A.D. 1453.) In 1959, he completed his studies at the Scuola Normale Superiore in the University of Pisa, receiving his MA and D.Phil. from Oxford in the same year.

== Career ==
From 1960 to 1962, Luttrell taught at Swarthmore College in Pennsylvania, United States. In 1963, he joined the Department of History at the University of Edinburgh as a lecturer, a position he held for four years. Between 1967 and 1973, he served as assistant director and librarian of the British School at Rome, before joining the Department of History at the Royal University of Malta from 1973 to 1976.

In 1977–1978, Luttrell was a visiting fellow at the School of Historical Studies at the Institute for Advanced Study, Princeton University. He then conducted research at the Institut de Recherche et d'Histoire des Textes (IRHT) within the French National Centre for Scientific Research (CNRS) in Paris before returning to the University of Malta as a lecturer from 1979 to 1980. In 1980, he was a fellow at the Harvard University Center for Byzantine Studies at Dumbarton Oaks, Washington, D.C.. From 1982 to 1985, his research was supported by a grant from the National Endowment for the Humanities. In 1985, Luttrell conducted research in the Veneto region of Italy as a fellow of the Gladys Krieble Delmas Foundation, (Note: The Gladys Krieble Delmas Foundation awards travel grants to scholars conducting historical research on Venice and the former Venetian empire."The Gladys Krieble Delmas Foundation". The Gladys Krieble Delmas Foundation.) and served as a visiting professor at the Istituto di Scienze Religiose, University of Padua.

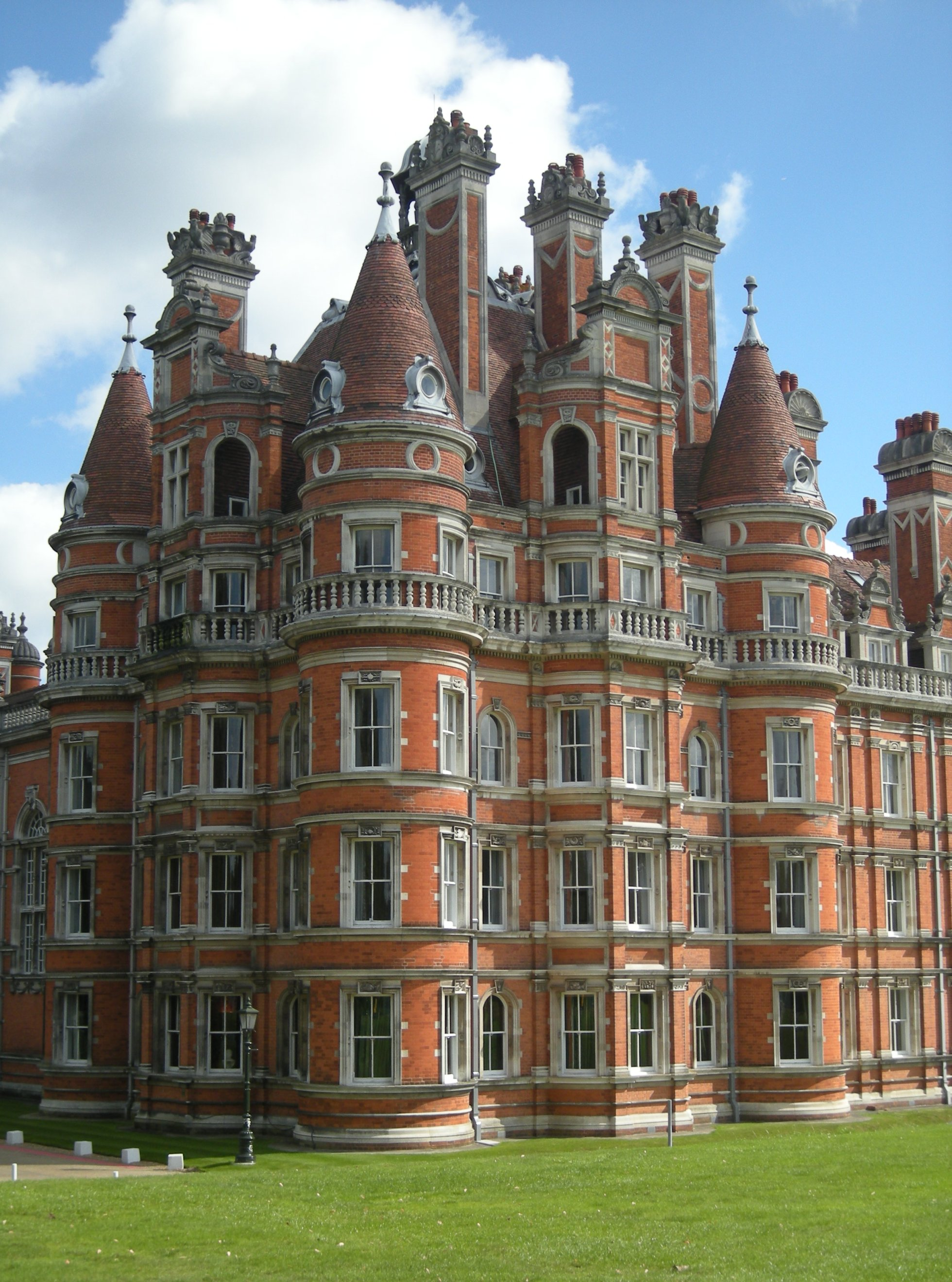
Royal Holloway, University of London where Anthony Luttrell has been an Honorary Research Associate at the Hellenic Institute since 2001

From 1986 to 1987 Luttrell held the Instituto Español Vicente Cañada Blanch University of London Senior Fellowship in Spain. Between 1987 and 1988, Luttrell was affiliated with the University of Würzburg, Germany, under the support of the Alexander von Humboldt Foundation. In 1988, he was appointed a Leverhulme research officer with the Venerable Order of St John of Jerusalem in London. He returned to the British School at Rome as a Balsdon Senior Fellow from 1992 to 1993. (Note: The Balsdon Fellowship supports established UK scholars researching Italian culture from prehistory to modern times at the British School at Rome."awards-residencies-humanities". bsr.ac.uk. 4 April 2024.) In 1993, he was appointed director of research at IRHT/CNRS in Orléans, France. Luttrell returned to the University of Würzburg from 1999 to 2000 after receiving the Alexander von Humboldt Foundation Research Prize for foreign humanities scholars.

Since 2001, Luttrell has been an honorary research associate at the Hellenic Institute, Royal Holloway, University of London, focusing on the Knights Hospitaller in Rhodes and Malta, as well as the Greek population of Rhodes during the medieval period. Luttrell's research on the Knights of the Order of the Hospital of St John of Jerusalem in Rhodes and Malta integrated archival investigation with archaeological studies during the 1970s and 1980s, providing insight into Malta's early and medieval history. Over the course of his career, he has published more than 250 works, including a six-volume collected study published by Routledge. Widely regarded as the foremost historian of the Hospitallers in the fourteenth and fifteenth centuries, his notable contributions include Studies on the Hospitallers after 1306: Rhodes and the West (2007), The Town of Rhodes 1306–1356 (2003) and Hospitaller Women in the Middle Ages, co-authored with Medieval historian Helen J. Nicholson (2006).

== Recognition and legacy ==
Luttrell has received several academic honours for his contributions to medieval history. In 1999–2000, he was awarded the Humboldt Research Award by the Alexander von Humboldt Foundation for his scholarly achievements. In 2012, he received the Prix Gustave Schlumberger from the Académie des Inscriptions et Belles-Lettres for his work on the history of the Knights Hospitaller.

Luttrell's research has been recognised as central to the study of the Hospitallers in the late medieval Mediterranean, with reviewers highlighting his extensive use of archival sources and his lasting influence on crusader historiography.

== Works ==
A selection of publications by Anthony Luttrell

=== Monographs ===
- Medieval Malta: Studies on Malta Before the Knights, ed. A. Luttrell (London, 1975)
- Ħal Millieri: A Maltese Casale, its Churches and Paintings, ed. A. Luttrell (Malta, 1976)
- The Hospitallers in Cyprus, Rhodes, Greece and the West, 1291–1440: Collected Studies (London, 1978)
- Gozo Citadel, Malta: Report Submitted to the Division of Cultural Heritage, UNESCO (typescript: Malta, 1981)
- Latin Greece, the Hospitallers and the Crusades, 1291–1440: Collected Studies (London, 1982)
- The Later History of the Maussolleion and its Use in the Hospitaller Castle at Bodrum = The Maussolleion at Halikarnassos: Reports of the Danish Archaeological Expedition to Bodrum, 2 – The Written Sources and their Archaeological Background: Jutland Archaeological Society Publications, 15 part 2 (Aarhus, 1986)
- with T. Blagg and A. Bonanno, Excavations at Ħal Millieri, Malta (Malta, 1991), pp. 152
- The Hospitallers of Rhodes and their Mediterranean World: Collected Studies (London, 1992)
- with T. Blagg, Le palais papal et autres bâtiments du XIVe siècle à Sorgues (Sorgues, 1998), pp. 139.
- The Hospitaller State on Rhodes and its Western Provinces: 1306–1462 (Aldershot, 1999)
- The Making of Christian Malta: From the Early Middle Ages to 1530 (Aldershot, 2002)
- La commanderie: institution des ordres militaires dans l'occident médiéval, ed. A. Luttrell and L. Pressouyre (Paris, 2002), pp. 361.
- The Town of Rhodes: 1306–1356 (Rhodes, 2003).
- Hospitaller Women in the Middle Ages, ed. A. Luttrell and H. Nicholson (Aldershot, 2006)
- Studies on the Hospitallers after 1306: Rhodes and the West (Aldershot, 2007)
