= Eric Christiansen =

British historian

- Born: 15 September 1937; Cheshunt, Hertfordshire, England
- Died: 31 October 2016 (aged 79)
- Occupations: Historian and academic
- Spouse: Sukey Hardie (m. 1981)

Academic background
- Education: Charterhouse School
- Alma mater: New College, Oxford

Academic work
- Discipline: History
- Sub-discipline: Middle Ages; Crusades; Vikings
- Institutions: New College, Oxford

Eric Christiansen (15 September 1937 – 31 October 2016) was a medieval historian and fellow emeritus of New College, Oxford University.

Christiansen was born in Cheshunt, Hertfordshire and was educated at Charterhouse School after which he served in the ranks of the Northamptonshire Regiment. He became a fellow of New College after completing a thesis on modern Spanish history but subsequently specialised in medieval history.

== Selected publications ==
- The origins of military power in Spain, 1800-1854. Oxford University Press, Oxford, 1967. (Oxford Historical Monographs)
- The Northern Crusades, the Baltic and the Catholic Frontier, 1100-1525. Macmillan, 1980. (New Studies in Medieval History) ISBN 978-0333262436
- The Works of Sven Aggesen: Twelfth-century Danish Historian. Viking Society for Northern Research, 1992. ISBN 978-0903521246
- Dudo of St Quentin: History of the Normans. Translation with introduction and notes. Boydell Press, 1998. ISBN 978-0851155524
- The Norsemen in the Viking Age. Wiley Blackwell, 2002. (The Peoples of Europe) ISBN 978-0631216773
