= New Studies in Medieval History =

New Studies in Medieval History was a series of undergraduate level books on medieval history published by Macmillan between 1973 and the mid-1990s.

French and Italian history notably featured in the list of volumes with Chris Wickham's Early Mediaeval Italy (1981), Edward James's The Origins of France (1982), and Roger Collins's Early Medieval Spain (1983) forming a trilogy that was described by Paul Fouracre in Teaching History in 1986 as being "required reading for undergraduates studying the early middle ages". Margaret Gibson, in The English Historical Review in 1988, described the series as having a "reputation for thorough, reliable scholarship".

== Selected titles ==
- Society and Politics in Mediaeval Italy. J.K. Hyde, 1973. ISBN 978-0333114605
- Spain in the Middle Ages: From Frontier to Empire, 1000-1500. Angus MacKay, 1977. ISBN 978-0333128176
- The Northern Crusades, the Baltic and the Catholic Frontier, 1100-1525. Eric Christiansen, 1980. ISBN 978-0333262436
- Early Mediaeval Italy: Central Power and Local Society, 400-1000. Chris Wickham, 1981. ISBN 978-0333266717
- The Origins of France: From Clovis to the Capetians 500-1000. Edward James, 1982. ISBN 978-0333270516
- Early Medieval Spain: Unity in Diversity, 400-1000. Roger Collins, 1983. ISBN 978-0312224646
- Hermits and the New Monasticism: A Study of Religious Communities in Western Europe 1000-1150. Henrietta Leyser, 1984. ISBN 978-0312369996
- Medieval Thought: The Western Intellectual Tradition from Antiquity to the Thirteenth Century. Michael Haren, 1985. ISBN 978-0333294635
- Literature and Society in Medieval France: The Mirror and the Image 1100-1500. Lynette R. Muir, 1986. ISBN 978-0312487485
- The Military Orders from the Twelfth to the Early Fourteenth Centuries. Alan Forey, 1991. ISBN 978-0333462355
- A History of France, 1460 - 1560: The Emergence of a Nation State. David Potter, 1995. ISBN 978-0333541234
- The Making of Orthodox Byzantium, 600-1025. Mark Whittow, 1996. ISBN 978-0333496015
