= De Osma Studentship =

Oxford award for Spanish studies

- Type: Studentship
- Awarded for: Research in Spanish studies at the Instituto Valencia of Don Juan, Madrid
- Sponsored by: University of Oxford
- Location: Oxford, England
- Country: United Kingdom
- Established: 10 July 1920
- Open to: Members of the University of Oxford
- Website: www.ox.ac.uk/students/fees-funding/prizes-and-awards/osma

The De Osma Studentship is an academic award of the University of Oxford supporting research in Spanish studies, including archaeology, art, geography, history, language, and literature. It provides opportunities for students to work at the Instituto Valencia of Don Juan in Madrid.

Established in 1920, it was among the first Oxford endowments devoted to Spanish studies and remains one of the university's oldest travel studentships.

== History ==
The Universities Tests Act 1871 lifted religious restrictions on the universities of England (Oxford, Cambridge, and Durham), allowing them to enroll non-Anglican students, including Catholics. The first Spaniard to study at Oxford, following the Universities Tests Act 1871, was Guillermo de Osma (1853–1922). Osma obtained a first-class degree in modern history.

On 15 March 1916 de Osma founded the Instituto Valencia of Don Juan in Madrid. In 1920 de Osma endowed the University of Oxford with £2,110 to establish a scholarship for the study of Spanish at the Instituto. The studentship admitted both men and women from the outset.

== Overview ==
The award is open to undergraduate and graduate members of the University of Oxford of any nationality. Candidates must demonstrate competence in written and spoken Spanish and propose a defined programme of study linked to the Instituto. Research typically focuses on areas for which the Instituto provides resources, including Spanish art, material culture, and early historical documents.

== Administration and tenure ==
The studentship is administered by the chancellor of the University of Oxford and is normally held for at least six weeks, most often during the Easter vacation. As of 2025, awards are valued at about £3,000. Holders undertake independent research in Madrid under arrangements with the Instituto Valencia of Don Juan.

== Notable recipients ==
- Alan Forey (born 1933) – British historian
- Ronald Hilton (1911–2007) – British-American journalist
- Henry Kamen (born 1936) – British historian
- George Alfred Kolkhorst (1897–1958) – First de Osma Student.
- Jeremy Lawrance (born 1952) – British historian
- Anthony Luttrell (born 1932) – Historian of the crusader states and Rhodes.
- Inez Pearn (1913–1976) – British novelist
- Peter Edward Lionel Russell (1913–2006) – Historian of Iberian studies.
