= Alan Deyermond =

British Hispanist (1932–2009)

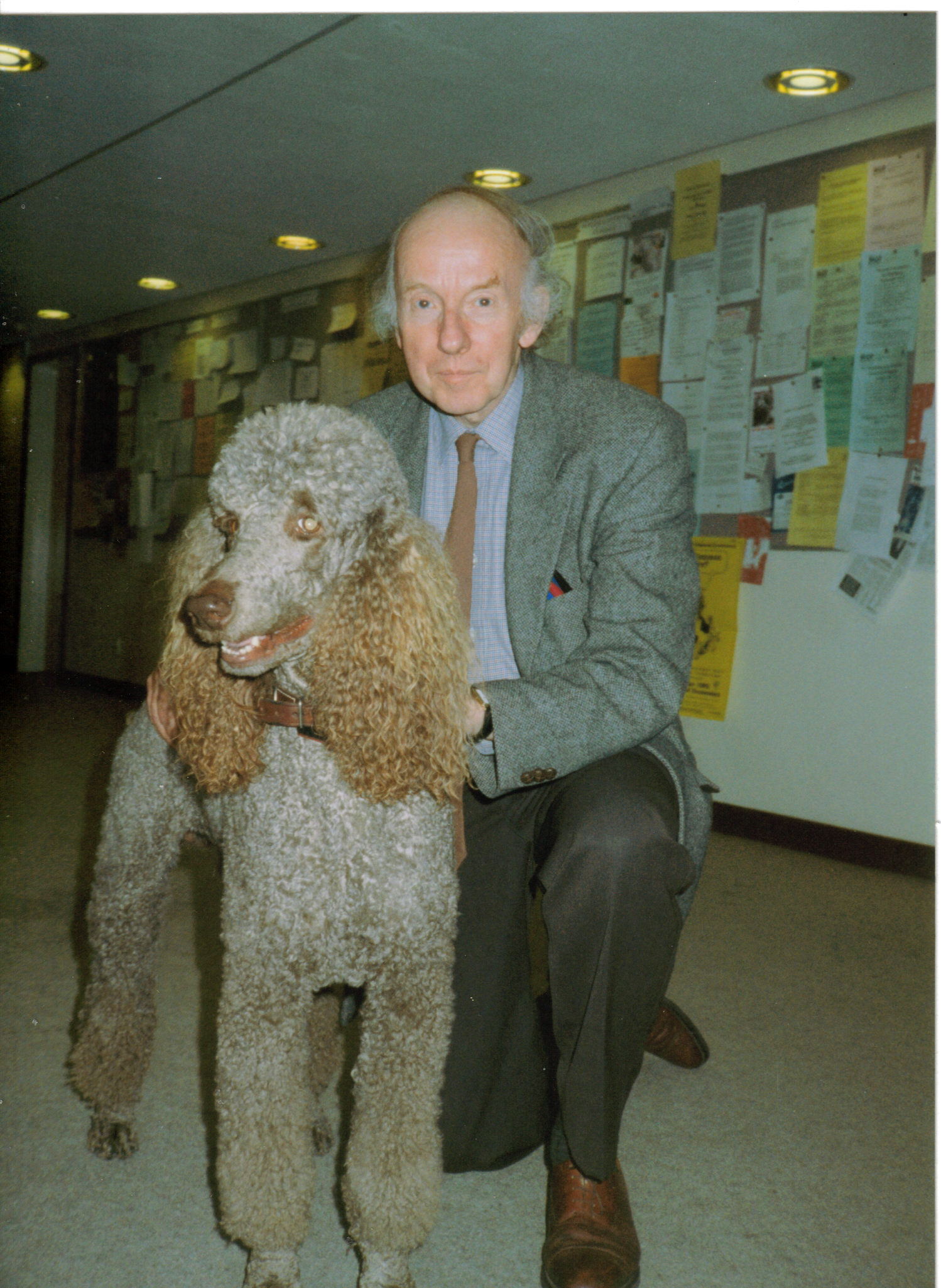
Alan Deyermond with his dog Tom in 1997

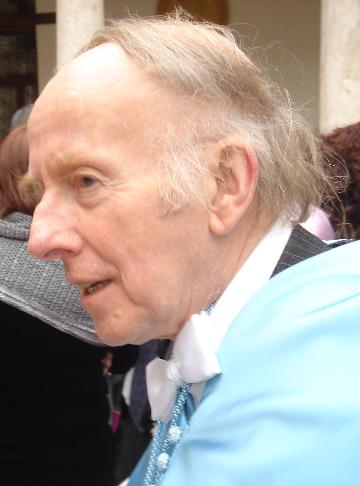

Alan Deyermond FBA (24 February 1932 – 19 September 2009) was a British professor of medieval Spanish literature and Hispanist. His obituary called him "the English-speaking world's leading scholar of medieval Hispanic literature". He spent his academic career associated with one University of London college, Westfield College (later merged with Queen Mary College, to form Queen Mary and Westfield College).

Deyermond started his career in 1955 as a lecturer at Westfield College, London. When Westfield merged with Queen Mary College in 1992, he moved to the Mile End site. In the period 1978–1980 he held a joint chair at Westfield and at Princeton University.

== Biography ==
Deyermond was born in Cairo, Egypt, where his father, an officer in the British Army, was stationed. He returned to England with his family in 1936. He began his secondary schooling in Liverpool, and switched to Victoria College, Jersey after the family moved in 1946. He entered Pembroke College, Oxford in 1950 on a scholarship, to read Modern Languages. An upper-level course which introduced Medieval Spanish literature showed him that much fruitful research could be accomplished in that field, and this became the focus of his subsequent research.

In 1953 Deyermond began BLitt research. He published his first article in 1954. He became an assistant lecturer at Westfield in 1955; he received his advanced degree in 1957. Also in 1957, he married Ann Bracken, a History graduate of St Hugh's College, Oxford (they had one daughter, Ruth). He became a tenured professor in 1969. From 1986 to 1989 he was Vice-Principal of Westfield. From 1978 to 1980 he held a joint Chair, split between Westfield and Princeton University. He was visiting professor at the University of Wisconsin (1972), UCLA (1977), Northern Arizona University (1986), Johns Hopkins University (1987), Universidad Nacional Autónoma de México (1992), University of A Coruña (1996), UC Irvine (Distinguished Visiting Professor, 1998), and Spanish National Research Council (2002–04).

Deyermond was a vegetarian from the age of 50 and a lifelong advocate of animal welfare and humane treatment. He was an active supporter of women's rights and feminist academic freedom. He was a member of the Liberal Party in the 1950s and 1960s, when he was involved in the Radical Reform Group. Throughout his life, he was an active member of the Anglican Church. He died on 19 September 2009.

== Published works ==
Deyermond's published output was prodigious – 40 books, written or edited, and almost 200 articles ranging through four centuries of medieval Hispanic literature. He recognised that a comprehensive study of Medieval literature would require several books which exist for studies in English but which were lacking for Spanish. He particularly lamented the lack of complete dictionaries, bibliographies and historical syntheses; as a result he authored the medieval volume for the Ernest Benn History of Spanish Literature (1969), which addressed the lack of an historical synthesis.

His volumes of History and Criticism of Spanish Literature (1980 and 1991) carry an in-depth bibliography. A twenty-year research effort culminated in Lost Literature of the Castilian Middle Ages (1995), which Deyermond cited as his favourite work. His last major work was as editor of A Century of British Medieval Studies for the British Academy (2007).

Deyermond founded the Medieval Hispanic Research Seminar (1968) at Westfield, which has come to attract scholars from around the world. As part of the Seminar's scope, Deyermond began publishing (1995) the Publications of the Medieval Hispanic Research Seminar, which carried articles that would be too long for a journal but not book-length. Some sixty volumes were issued, with Deyermond performing nearly all the work.

Deyermond participated in founding Tamesis Books (now part of Boydell & Brewer) and of the series Research Bibliographies & Checklists (Grant & Cutler), of which he was General Editor. He was General Editor of Critical Guides to Spanish Texts (Grant & Cutler).

=== Partial list of published works ===
- Alan Deyermond, A Century of British Medieval Studies (British Academy Centenary Monographs, 2007)
- Alan Deyermond, Keith Whinnom, Jeremy Lawrance, The Textual History and Authorship of Celestina (Department of Hispanic Studies, Queen Mary, University of London, 2007)
- Alan Deyermond, David Graham Pattison, Eric Southworth, Peter Edward Russell Mio Cid Studies: 'some Problems of Diplomatic' Fifty Years on (Dept. of Hispanic Studies, Queen Mary, University of London, 2002)
- Alan Deyermond, Point of View in the Ballad: The Prisoner, The Lady and the Shepherd and Others (Department of Hispanic Studies, Queen Mary and Westfield College, 1996)
- Alan Deyermond, Historical Literature in Medieval Iberia (Department of Hispanic Studies, Queen Mary and Westfield College, 1996)
- Alan Deyermond, La literatura perdida de la Edad Media castellana: catálogo y estudio, I: Épica y romances, Obras de Referencia, 7 (Salamanca: Ediciones Univ. de Salamanca)
- Alan Deyermond, Historia De La Literatura Espanola : La Edad Media (Letras e ideas: Instrumenta) (Editorial Ariel, 1995)
- Alan Deyermond, Jeremy Lawrance (eds), Letters and Society in Fifteenth-century Spain: Studies Presented to P.E. Russell on His Eightieth Birthday (Dolphin Book Co., 1993)
- Alan Deyermond, Tradiciones y puntos de vista en la ficción sentimental (UNAM, 1993)
- Alan Deyermond and Charles Davis (eds.), Golden Age Spanish Literature: Studies in Honour of John Varey by His Colleagues and Pupils (Westfield College, 1991)
- Alan Deyermond, "Mio Cid" Studies (Támesis Books, 1977)
- Alan Deyermond, The Lost Literature of Medieval Spain: Notes for a Tentative Catalogue (Medieval Research Seminar, Department of Spanish, Westfield College, 1977)
- Alan Deyermond, Lazarillo de Tormes: A Critical Guide (Grant and Cutler, 1975)
- Alan Deyermond, Historia de la literatura española: La edad media (Editorial Ariel, 1973)
- Alan Deyermond, A Literary History of Spain: The Middle Ages (Barnes & Noble, 1971)
- Alan Deyermond, Epic Poetry and the Clergy: Studies on the Mocedades de Rodrigo (Tamesis Books, 1968)
- Alan Deyermond, The Petrarchan Sources of La Celestina (Oxford: Oxford University Press, 1961; with new preface and supplementary bibliography, Greenwood, 1975, ISBN 0837167248)

== Honours ==
Deyermond became a fellow of the British Academy in 1988. In June 2009 he was elected corresponding Fellow of the Real Academia Española, a distinction granted very few foreign academics.

Honours were heaped upon him by scholarly societies worldwide. When he retired in 1997, two festschrifts were issued in his honour (the first such issue in his honour was compiled by American scholars in 1986). He gave hundreds of lectures and conference papers in over a dozen countries.

Deyermond received honorary degrees from the universities of Oxford, Valencia, and Georgetown. He was a Fellow of the British Academy and became one of the small number of corresponding members of the Real Academia Española in 2009. He was elected a Corresponding Fellow of the Medieval Academy of America in 1979. In 1994 he was awarded the Nebrija Prize, given each year by the University of Salamanca to the non-Spanish scholar who has contributed most to the understanding of Spanish culture and the Spanish language.

A reflection of his standing in the world of Hispanism and medieval studies was his presidency of the es:Asociación Internacional de Hispanistas (1992–95; honorary life president since 1995) and of the International Courtly Literature Society (1983). In 1985 he was made a socio de honor of the Asociación Hispánica de Literatura Medieval and, since 1999, an honorary fellow of Queen Mary, University of London.
