= Jeremy Lawrance =

English professor, linguist, historian

- Born: Jeremy Norcliffe Haslehurst Lawrance; December 12, 1952 (age 73); Jinja, Uganda
- Known for: Research on Spanish Renaissance humanism and textual scholarship
- Title: Honorary Research Fellow, Faculty of Medieval and Modern Languages
- Honors: Fellow of the British Academy (2011)

Academic background
- Education: Balliol College, Oxford (MA, DPhil)

Academic work
- Discipline: Hispanic studies, Linguistics, History
- Institutions: Magdalen College, Oxford; University of Manchester; University of Nottingham; University of Oxford
- Main interests: Literature studies, Textual criticism, Medieval and Renaissance studies
- Notable works: Francisco de Vitoria: Political Writings (1991)

Jeremy Norcliffe Haslehurst Lawrance FBA (born 12 December 1952) is a Ugandan born British linguist and historian, recognised for his work on Spanish humanism and Renaissance literature. He is Honorary Research Fellow in the Faculty of Medieval and Modern Languages at the University of Oxford, and Emeritus Professor of Spanish Golden Age Studies at the University of Nottingham. Elected a Fellow of the British Academy in 2011, he has also served as President of the Association of Hispanists of Great Britain and Ireland.

== Life ==
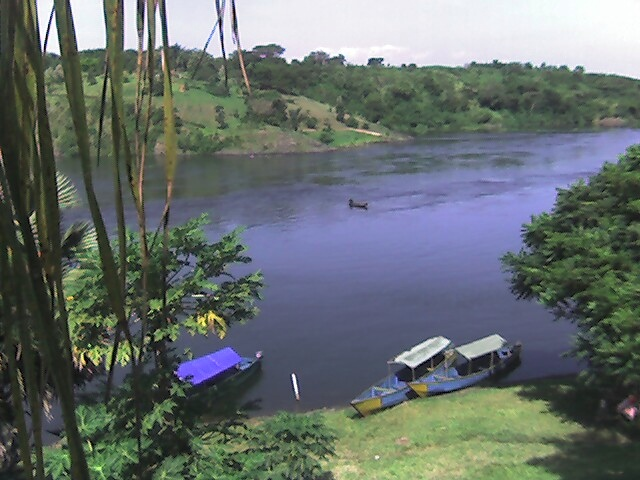
The source of the Nile, near Lawrance's birthplace

Born at Jinja, Uganda, near the source of the River Nile, Lawrance was the son of Jeremy Charles Dalton Lawrance, OBE and officer of the Colonial Administrative Service, by his marriage to Elizabeth Ann Haslehurst. His father was also a writer on the Iteso people and their language and on African land tenure.

Lawrance was educated at King's School, Canterbury, and Balliol College, Oxford, where he graduated MA in 1978 and DPhil in 1983. Lawrance became a de Osma Student 1975–76, and was able to complete his first research trip to Spain. From 1978 until 1985 he was a Fellow of Magdalen College, Oxford. In 1985 he migrated to the University of Manchester, where he was a lecturer in Spanish until 1993, then Professor of Spanish until 2006. He was President of the Association of Hispanists of Great Britain and Ireland from 2004 to 2006. From 2006 up until his retirement in 2018, he has been Professor of Spanish Golden Age Studies at the University of Nottingham. In 2018 Lawrance moved back to Oxford, where he holds an Honorary Research Fellowship at the Faculty of Medieval and Modern Languages.

His areas of academic interest are the impact of humanism and the revival of learning in Spain during the Renaissance and the Baroque era, the history of Spanish cultures in the Middle Ages and the early modern period, and editing unpublished manuscripts and early printed books. His most notable work includes a critical translation of Francisco de Vitoria's political writings, with Anthony Pagden, published by Cambridge University Press in 1991.

In Who's Who, Lawrance states his recreations as "Searching for stone circles with daughter, entertaining friends, evading capture by elephants, loud music, geriatric football, Bologna."

== Selected publications ==
- "On Fifteenth-Century Spanish Vernacular Humanism" in Ian Michael and Richard A. Cardwell (eds.), Medieval and Renaissance studies in honour of Robert Brian Tate (Oxford: Dolphin, 1986)
- Francisco de Vitoria: political writings, ed. and translated with Anthony Pagden (Cambridge University Press, 1991)
- "The Middle Indies: Damião de Góis on Preseter John and the Ethiopians" in Renaissance Studies 6 (1992)
- Alfonso de Palencia: Gesta Hispaniensia, ed. and translated with Brian Tate, vol. 1 (1998), vol. 2 (1999)
- "Black Africans in Renaissance Spanish literature", Chapter 3 of Thomas Foster Earle, K. J. P. Lowe (eds.), Black Africans in Renaissance Europe (2005)
- "Illustrating the Language: the cultural role of translation in the Spanish Renaissance" in Rhian Davies, Anny Brooksbank Jones (eds.), The Place of Argument: essays in honour of Nicholas G. Round (2007), pp. 125–148
- The Textual History and Authorship of Celestina, with Alan Deyermond and Keith Whinnom (Department of Hispanic Studies, Queen Mary, University of London, 2007)
- Spanish Conquest, Protestant Prejudice: Las Casas and the Black Legend (Nottingham, 2009)
