= Alan Forey =

English historian

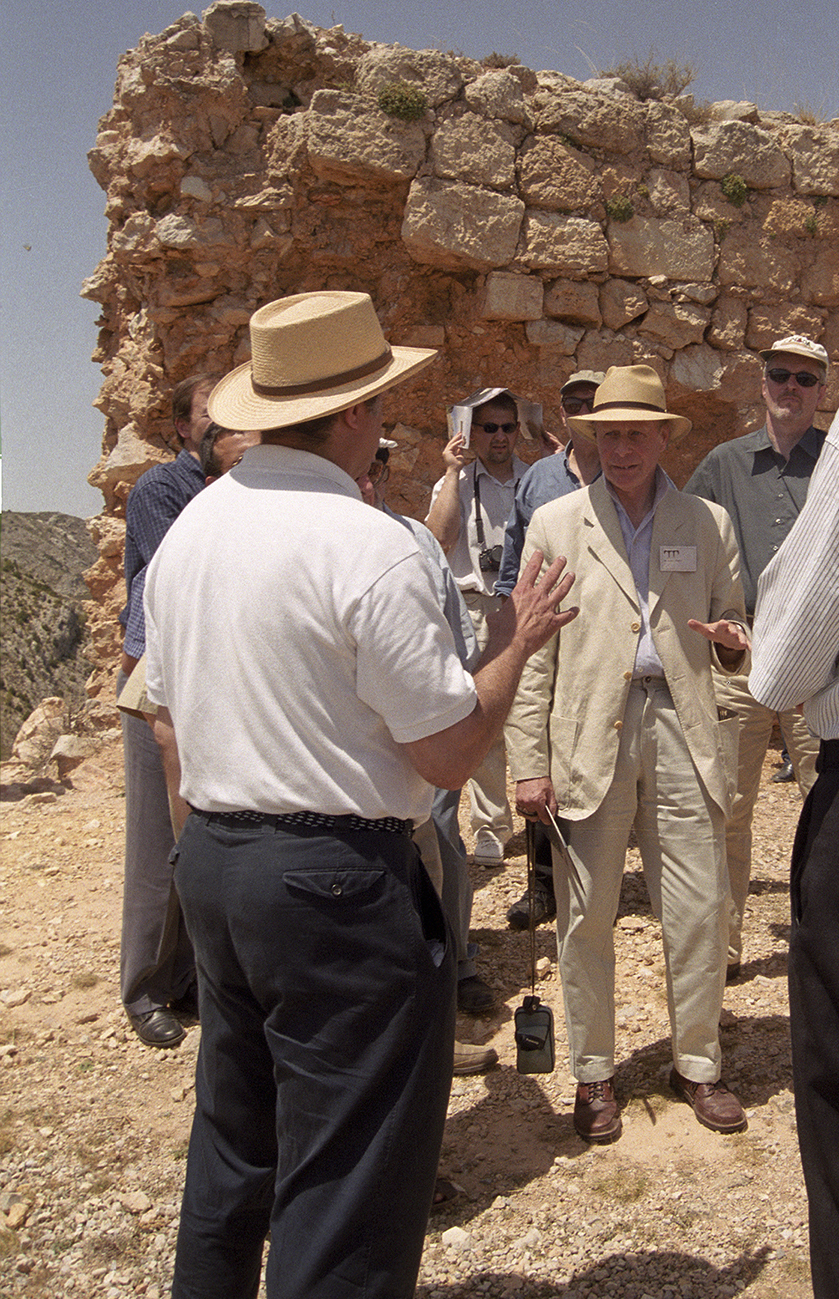
- Alan Forey -in the centre of the photo- during a visit to the castle of Castellot (Teruel), during a Congress held in 2001 in honour of S. Runciman.
- Born: 1933 (age 91–92)
- Known for: Authority on the history of the military orders of the Middle Ages
- Scientific career
- Fields: History
- Institutions: University of Durham

Alan John Forey (born 1933) is reader emeritus in history at the University of Durham and an authority on the history of the military orders of the Middle Ages. In 1994, his work was collected and published in the Variorum Collected Studies series as Military Orders and Crusades.

== Biography ==
Between 1956 and 1958, Forey spent time studying in Madrid at the Instituto Valencia of Don Juan on a De Osma Studentship that he won twice, the Studentship covered his expenses and research travel costs.

== Selected publications ==
- The Templars of the "Corona de Aragón". Oxford University Press, Oxford, 1973.
- "The Military Order of St Thomas of Acre", English Historical Review, 92 (1977), pp. 481–503.
- The Military Orders from the Twelfth to the Early Fourteenth Centuries. Macmillan, 1991. (New Studies in Medieval History) ISBN 978-0333462355
- Military Orders and Crusades. 1994. ISBN 978-0860783985 (Variorum Collected Studies)
- "The Military Orders 1120-1312", in Jonathan Riley-Smith (Ed.) The Oxford Illustrated History of the Crusades. Oxford University Press, Oxford, 2001. ISBN 9780192854285
