= Anthony Pagden =

American political historian

- Education: University of Barcelona, Oxford University
- Spouse: Giulia Sissa
- Scientific career
- Fields: Political theory, global history, international law
- Workplaces: University of California Los Angeles

Anthony Robin Dermer Pagden is an author and professor of political science and history at the University of California, Los Angeles.

== Biography ==
Anthony Pagden is the son of John Brian Dermer Pagden and Joan Mary Pagden. Mr Pagden was educated at the Grange School in Santiago de Chile and Westminster School in London. He attended the University of Barcelona from 1964 to 1967. From 1967 to 1969 he worked as an assistant editor at the Trianon Press (Paris), and as a free-lance translator. He also spent some time in Cyprus in 1967 and 1968. Admitted in 1969 to Oriel College, Oxford to read Persian and Arabic, he changed the following year to History and Spanish. B.A. 1972 (Congratulatory First Class Honours) awarded the De Osma Studentship; M.A. (Oxon) 1979; D.Phil. (Oxon) 1980.

He has been senior research scholar of Worcester College, junior research fellow of Merton College, senior research fellow of the Warburg Institute, and from 1980 until 1997 was lecturer, and then University Reader in Intellectual History at Cambridge University and a fellow of Girton College from 1980 to 1983 and of King's College from 1985 to 1997. In 1997 he succeeded J. G. A. Pocock as the Harry C. Black Professor in History at the Johns Hopkins University. He was also professorial lecturer in international relations - global theory and history, at the School of Advanced International Studies, Washington D.C. He has held visiting positions at the Institute for Advanced Study, Princeton, the European University Institute, Florence, Italy, the University of Santiago de Compostela, the Center for Kulturforskning, University of Aarhus (Denmark), Harvard University, at the Universidad Nacional de Educación a Distancia (Madrid) as the Banco de Bilbao y Vizcaya Visiting Professor of Philosophy, at the Institute for the Humanities, University of Michigan and at the École des hautes études en sciences sociales (Paris). He is currently distinguished professor in the Departments of Political Science and History at the University of California Los Angeles. He is married to the author and classical scholar Giulia Sissa, and has two children, Felix Alexander Xavier Pagden-Ratcliffe (born 1990) and Sebastian George Aurelian Pagden-Ratcliffe (born 1994) by a previous marriage.

== Select bibliography ==
- Luis Buñuel, "Simon del deserto" (as translator) 1969
- Hernán Cortés: Letters from Mexico (as editor and translator) 1972
- Mexican Pictorial Manuscripts in the Bodleian Library 1975
- The Maya: Diego de Landa's "Account of the affairs of Yucatan" (as editor and translator) 1975
- The Spiritual Conquest of the Mayas 1975
- The Fall of Natural Man: the American Indian and the origins of comparative anthropology 1983 (winner of the Eugene Bolton Prize) translated into Spanish and Italian
- The Languages of Political Theory in Early-Modern Europe (as editor) 1987
- Spanish Imperialism and the Political Imagination 1990 Translated into Spanish
- Francisco de Vitoria: political writings, ed. and translated with Jeremy Lawrance, 1991
- European Encounters with the New World: From Renaissance to Romanticism 1993 Translated into German
- The Uncertainties of Empire: Essays in Iberian and Spanish-American Intellectual History 1994
- Lords of All the World: Ideologies of Empire in Spain, Britain and France, c.1500-c.1800 1995 Translated into Spanish and Italian
- Facing Each Other:The World’s Perception of Europe and Europe’s Perception of the World (as editor) 2000
- Peoples and Empires: A Short History of European Migration, Exploration, and Conquest, from Greece to the Present 2001 Translated into Spanish, Portuguese, Greek, Dutch and Japanese
- The Idea of Europe from Antiquity to the European Union (as editor) 2002 Translated into Turkish
- Worlds at War: The 2,500 year Struggle between East and West 2008 Translated into Portuguese, Spanish, Italian, Greek, Chinese and Korean
- The Enlightenment - and Why it Still Matters 2013 Translated into Spanish, Italian and Chinese
- The Burdens of Empire 1539 to the Present 2015 Translated into Chinese
- The Pursuit of Europe: A History 2022 Translated into Spanish and Greek
- Oltre gli stati. Poteri, popli e ordine globali, 2023
- Beyond States. Powers, Peoples and Global Order 2024
