= Henry Kamen =

British historian (born 1936)

Henry Arthur Kamen (born 4 October 1936 in Rangoon) is a British historian who has published extensively on Spain and the Spanish Empire. In particular, he has contributed to studies of the Spanish Inquisition: his The Spanish Inquisition, originally published in 1965, was revised and expanded in The Spanish Inquisition: A Historical Revision, published in 1998. In 2017, Kamen was indicted for possessing child pornography in Athens, Georgia.

== Biography ==
Henry Arthur Kamen was born in Rangoon, British Burma (now Myanmar) in 1936, the son of Maurice Joseph Kamen, an Anglo-Burmese engineer working for Shell Oil, and his wife, Agnes Frizelle, by descent half Anglo-Irish and half Nepalese. Kamen was educated at Chislehurst and Sidcup Grammar School from where he won a Major Scholarship to study at the University of Oxford, earning his doctorate at St Antony's College. From 1962 to 1963, Kamen studied at the Instituto Valencia of Don Juan in Madrid after winning a De Osma Studentship.

During National Service he studied Russian, and his first book was a translation of the poems of Boris Pasternak (Boris Pasternak in the Interlude Poems 1945-1960).

== Career ==
Between 1966 and 1992, Kamen taught early modern Spanish history at the University of Warwick. He has worked at various universities in Spain. In 1970, he was elected a Fellow of the Royal Historical Society. In 1984 he was appointed Herbert F. Johnson Professor at the Institute for Research in the Humanities, University of Wisconsin - Madison. He was a professor of the Higher Council for Scientific Research (CSIC) in Barcelona from 1993 until his retirement in 2002. Since then he has continued lecturing and writing, and lives currently in Spain and in the United States. He is an influential contributor to the pages of the Spanish daily newspaper El Mundo.

== Work ==
As a historian, my task is simply to investigate the past through an intelligent use of both scholarship and imagination.

Strongly influenced by the research methods and social philosophy of the historians of the French Annales School, he has attempted to combine quantitative history with sociological analysis and accessible narrative. In reaction against an earlier phase in which he became immersed in statistical economic history, he has produced a number of biographies of the rulers of Spain, whom he considers unduly neglected. He has also been one of the leading historians who have attacked the traditional "Black Legend" view of the Spanish Inquisition. His own views have changed since he published a book about the Inquisition in the 1960s: his 1998 book provides extensive evidence that the Inquisition was not made up of fanatics who rejoiced in torture and executions and that, for example, Inquisition gaols were better run and more humane than ordinary Spanish prisons.

One of the most important living historians of Spain, Kamen has devoted his career, most famously in his revisionist books on Philip II and on the Spanish Inquisition, to taking on the so-called Black Legend, promoted by Spain's opponents. That he has in many ways succeeded, thanks to decades of engaged scholarship, in fundamentally altering historians' understanding of 15th- and 16th-century Spain is testimony to the force of his arguments and the depth and quality of his rigorous, archive-based research.

— The Atlantic Monthly (Boston), 2012.

== Selected publications ==
- Boris Pasternak, In the Interlude: Poems 1945-1960, Translated into English Verse by Henry Kamen. Foreword by Sir Maurice Bowra. Notes by George Katkov. London, New York, and Toronto: Oxford University Press (1962) (Oxford Paperbacks, 45)
- The War of Succession in Spain 1700-15. Indiana: University Press (1969)
- The Iron Century: Social Change in Europe, 1550–1660. London: Weidenfeld & Nicolson (1971); New York: Praeger Publishers (1972)
- "A Forgotten Insurrection of the Seventeenth Century: The Catalan Peasant Rising of 1688," The Journal of Modern History, Vol. 49, No. 2 (June 1977), pp. 210–30.
- Spain in the Later Seventeenth Century. London: Longman (1980)
- Golden Age Spain. Basingstoke: Macmillan Education (1988)
- European Society 1500–1700. New York; London: Routledge (1984)(1992) [revision of The Iron Century]
- "Lo Statista" in "L'uomo barocco" (R. Villari, ed.) Laterza, Roma-Bari, Italy (1991)
- The Phoenix and the Flame. Catalonia and the Counter-Reformation. London and New Haven: Yale University Press (1993)
- Philip of Spain. New Haven: Yale University Press (1997)
- The Spanish Inquisition: A Historical Revision. London and New Haven: Yale University Press (1997)
- Early Modern European Society. London: Routledge (2000)
- Philip V of Spain: The King Who Reigned Twice. New Haven: Yale University Press (2001).
- Empire: How Spain Became a World Power, 1492–1763. New York: HarperCollins (2003)
- The Duke of Alba. London and New Haven: Yale University Press (2004)
- The Disinherited; Exile and the Making of Spanish Culture, 1492–1975. New York: HarperCollins (2007)
- Imagining Spain. Historical Myth and National Identity. London and New Haven: Yale University Press (2008)
- The Escorial. Art and Power in the Renaissance. London and New Haven: Yale University Press (2010)
- Spain 1469–1714: a Society of Conflict. London and New York: Longman (2014)

== Selected reviews ==
- On Philip of Spain, by M.N. Carlos Eire in Renaissance Quarterly, vol.52, 1999, "Kamen's Philip is a stunning achievement, not only because of its revisionist outlook and its use of sources, but also because of its style and structure. This is an exemplary piece of scholarship that reads very much like a good novel".
- On Empire, in The Daily Telegraph, "A boldly conceived project that sustains its case with a pugnacious elan that carries the reader through to the final page": and in The Guardian, "brilliant ... lucid, scholarly and perceptive ... a revelation".
- On The Disinherited, in The Guardian, "Wonderfully accomplished, beautifully told": and in The Weekly Standard, Washington DC, "Henry Kamen is the finest historian of Spain presently writing in any language".
- On Imagining Spain, Eric Ormsby in The New York Sun, "Drawing on archival sources, unpublished manuscripts, and a vast body of scholarship in several languages, he takes a fresh look at Spanish notions of nationhood, monarchy, and empire. . . . Only someone who loves Spain deeply could have written this book."
- On The Escorial: Art and Power in the Renaissance, Prof Patrick Williams, in Literary Review (London), June 2010: "Lively and contentious, informed by a profound understanding of the period, and, as always, elegantly written."
