= Ingram Cobbin =

English independent minister

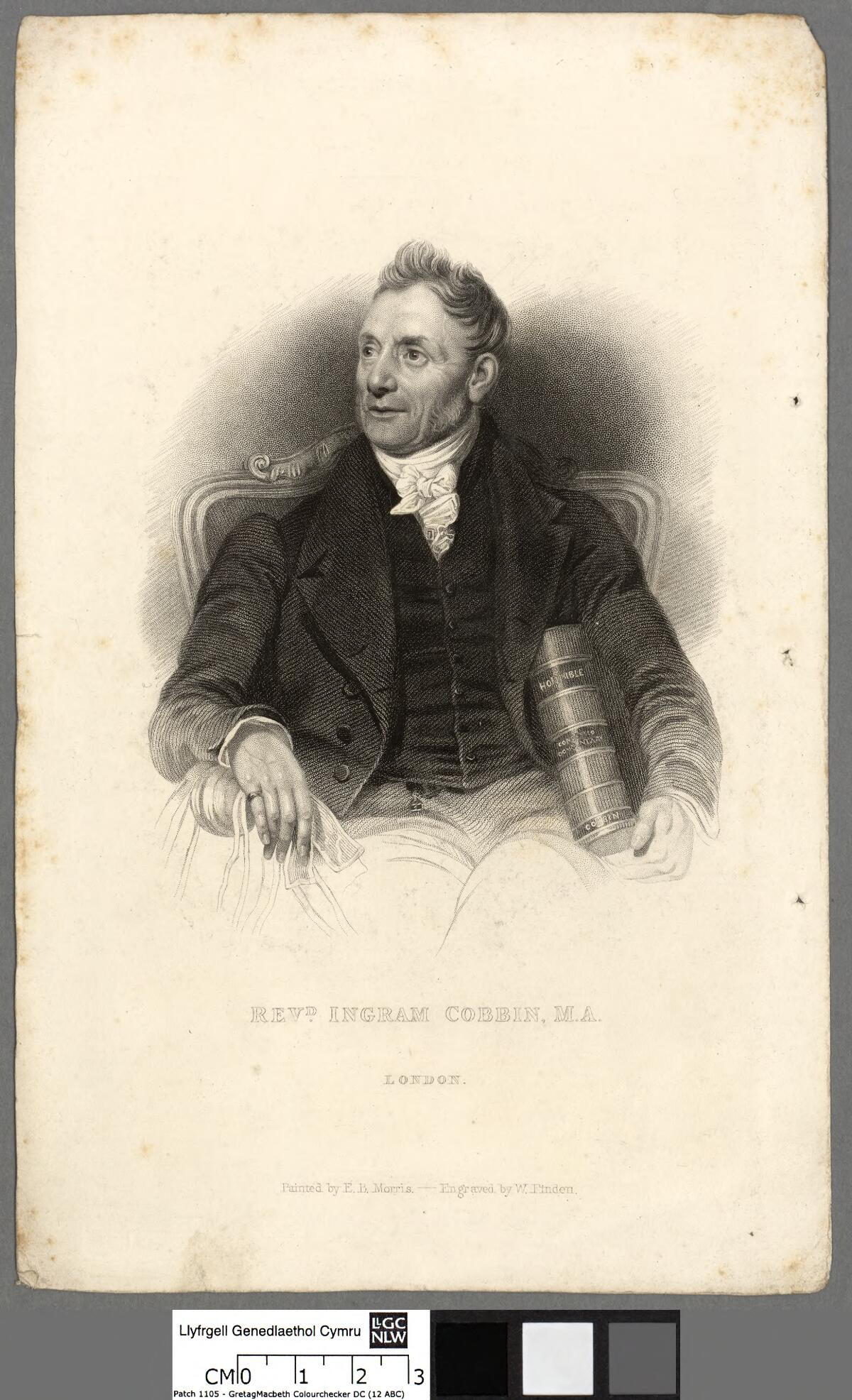
- Born: December 1777; London
- Died: 10 March 1851 (aged 73)
- Occupation: Minister

Ingram Cobbin (December 1777 – 10 March 1851) was an English independent minister.

== Biography ==
Cobbin was born in London in December 1777, and educated at Hoxton Academy. He became minister at South Molton in 1802, and afterwards officiated at Banbury, Holloway, Putney, Crediton, Worcester, and Lymington. For some time he acted as secretary to the British and Foreign School Society, and in 1819 he was appointed the first secretary of the Home Missionary Society. Ill-health compelled him to retire from the ministry in 1828, and he thenceforward devoted his energies at his residence in Camberwell to the compilation of a large number of scholastic and biblical works, among which may be mentioned his 'Evangelical Synopsis;' his 'Condensed,' 'Portable,' 'Domestic,' 'Analytical,' and ' Oriental ' Commentaries; 'The Book of Popery,' 1840; and 'Bible Remembrancer,' 1848. He died on 10 March 1851.
