= World Association of International Studies =

American research institute

- Formation: 1965
- Location: France
- Website: waisworld.org/en/wais/home
- Formerly called: California Institute of International Studies

The World Association of International Studies (WAIS) was founded by Ronald Hilton in 1965 as the California Institute of International Studies at Stanford University's Bolivar House. WAIS membership is by invitation only. The stated goal of WAIS is "finding Peace, Light and Truth (Pax, Lux et Veritas) through informed, balanced, and spirited cross-disciplinary discussions".

WAIS has had, over the years, a number of scholars of note in various disciplines from around the world, including the English historian Sir Paul Preston, considered one of the foremost historians of the Spanish Civil War, David Wingeate Pike, late of the American University of Paris, noted author and historian of World War II, Stanley Payne, Professor of the University of Wisconsin and noted scholar of European fascism, Ángel Viñas Martín, noted scholar of the Spanish Civil War, and others as members.

WAIS has conducted many conferences since its inception. WAIS Conferences: 1980-81: East-West Confrontations; 1996: War Crimes and War Criminals; 2006: Critical World Issues; 2009: Globalities and Localities; 2011: Founder Centennial Conference, Torquay, UK; 2013: What is Now, an Interdisciplinary Conference, Adrian, Michigan; 2015: The WAIS Golden Jubilee, "Hegemony: Past, Present, Future", Stanford University.

== Publications ==
From 1965 to 1970, the Hispanic American Report was the publication of the California Institute of International Studies. In 1970, it was succeeded by the World Affairs Report. WAIS discontinued the publication of the printed version of the World Affairs Report in 1990. The online version continued on the WAIS home page. World Affairs Report is updated daily. Since 2006, the editor in chief is John Eipper, who was awarded his PhD by the University of Michigan, who was a protege of Ronald Hilton and is Professor of Spanish and Latin American Studies at Adrian College. Since the death of Ronald Hilton in 2007, the Chairman of WAIS has been Cameron Sawyer, a graduate of the University of Michigan Law School and a former Deutsche Akademische Austauschdienst fellow at the Ludwigs-Maximillians University at Munich, Germany.
