= Ronald Hilton =

British-American journalist (1911–2007)

Ronald Hilton (July 31, 1911, Torquay, England – February 20, 2007, Palo Alto, California) was a British-American academic, reporter and think-tank specialist, specializing in Latin America and, in particular, Fidel Castro's Cuba. Ronald Hilton was educated at Oxford University and at the University of California at Berkeley and became a US citizen in 1946. He launched the Hispanic American Report in 1948. He spent most of his long working life at Stanford University.

== Early years ==
"[A]s a child I wandered around the shores on its beautiful bay during World War 1. Navy vessels came and went and I clearly remember arrival of a destroyer different from the ones I was used to; it was American. The United States had just entered the war, and I became conscious of the existence of that distant land, never dreaming that I would make my home there. Some wives of interned Germans were billeted with us; they were kind people, and we became very fond of them. At the same time I saw young English soldiers going off to fight the Hun; I recall how one kindly helped me across a busy street. Then, at the railway station, I would see Red Cross trains arrive, full of young English soldiers with all kinds of ugly wounds. I became aware of the tragic absurdity of such international 'relations.'... My family moved to Winchester, where I haunted the great cathedral where Philip II of Spain, the Devil of the South, married bloody Mary Tudor. The chantry of Bishop Gardiner, in the gaunt counter-reformation style of El Escorial, contrasted with the more lovely ones of earlier bishops, notably that of William of Wykham. One of my first publications was a detailed account of the marriage, based on the conflicting versions of chronicles and historians. I realized that history comes in different colors and shades."

He was attached to Oxford university from 1929 to 1937, first to Christ Church (1929–36), then to Magdalen (1937) majoring in French and minored in Spanish. It was through Salvador de Madariaga that Hilton earned the De Osma Studentship at the Instituto Valencia of Don Juan and went to Madrid in late March, 1931.

== Spain 1930s ==
"I went to Spain by train, changing at Irun because, while France had standard-gauge track, Spain’s was broad-gauge. My first shock came when I entered the station men’s room. Scrawled in black on the wall was “¡Muera el rey!” (Death to the King!)." His first stop was San Sebastian where there was an active nationals movement. The adventure continued to Alava and Burgos by train that was patrolled by armed Civil Guards. At Avila, huddled by a coal fire in the station waiting room waiting for dawn, hungrily Hilton tried churros that tasted like ambrosia. At Madrid he met the family he would stay with in a modest apartment.

Hilton's Madrid experience was dominated by the fall of the monarchy. He observed that any Spaniards, especially the Basques and Catalans, resented Alfonso XIII rule, while the intellectuals were especially resentful because the king scorned them. The army was much in evidence. Many churches and other old buildings had been turned into barracks. When the king left the country, in Madrid the public mood was one of rejoicing. Crowds strolled happily through the sunny streets. The Republicans claimed that they were restoring ancient liberties and that the blue in an old flag symbolized those liberties. The old red-yellow-red striped flag lost one red stripe, replaced by a deep blue one. It happened that the capes of the police had a deep blue lining, so they draped the cape over their shoulders to show their republican sympathies. The crowds appreciated the symbolism and applauded. He returned to England and later recorded that no one realized that a civil war was in the making.

"British interest in Catalonia derived from the historic trade ties between England and Barcelona, and also from dim memories of the War of the Spanish Succession, when Catalonia sided with Britain. So I decided in 1932 to go to Barcelona." At the Institute of Catalan Studies, Hilton took courses on Catalan medieval history and literature. He saw the complex character of Catalan nationalism where the revolutionary spirit was expressed in the repeated playing of “Els Segadors” (“The Harvesters”), the song of the anti-Spanish country people, just as in Madrid he heard constantly the music of the Hymn of Riego. The refrain of “The harvesters” was “Bom colp de fals,” a good blow with a scythe to cut the Spaniards’ heads off.

Hilton graduated from Oxford in 1933 deeply dissatisfied with the idea of exclusive study of old book he began a cycling through Europe with his first stop at Strasbourg where he encountered Nazi government for the first time. From there he crossed the Alps to Venice then back to France via through Switzerland. He spent the 1934-35 studying at the Sorbonne to prepare a doctorat d’état. While in Paris he took up studying Russian at the Institute of Oriental Languages which made his World Affairs Report possible. In the spring of 1934 he set off to Madrid by bicycle by way of Spain's north coast then through Portugal. At Madrid the atmosphere was very political and politics the major theme of conversation on every level of society. The theme in cafes were 'We have our republic, now we want our revolution! From this moment on there would be no peace in Spain'

== Bay Of Pigs ==
He was an academic expert on Latin America who helped to uncover the CIA's clandestine preparations for the Bay of Pigs Invasion of Cuba in April 1961. During a research trip to Guatemala in 1960, he learned that a group of Cuban exiles were training at a secret camp (which everybody there seemed to know about) for their ill-fated attempt to overthrow Fidel Castro's regime. Hilton was the main source when the left-wing weekly The Nation broke the story in November 1960. The invasion went ahead anyway a few months later, after the Kennedy administration succeeded in persuading the New York Times (NYT), that had decided to follow up the Nation story, to delay publishing its own investigations. Hilton later published a series of articles about Castro's (1959) revolution in the Hispanic American Report that were written by Herbert Matthews and which the NYT had declined to publish because it felt that Matthews had grown too close to the Cuban leader. He founded the World Association of International Studies (WAIS) in 1965 (originally known as California Institute of International Studies (CIIS)), a global political, economic and religious forum, after resigning as the Director of the Institute of Hispanic American and Luso-Brazilian Studies (Bolivar House), which he had founded earlier at Stanford University. Hilton continued in his post as the Professor of Romanic Languages at the Stanford University until he retired at the mandatory age of 65.

In 1970, he launched the World Affairs Report (WAR), that continued publication until 1990 and became an on-line publication afterward through DIALOG. The main feature of WAR was "International Report: The World as Seen from Moscow. It analyzed the Soviet version developments, based on Soviet as well as non-Soviet sources." He became a Visiting Fellow of the Hoover Institution at Stanford in 1987. He died in 2007 from cancer, aged 95.

== Family ==
In 1939, he married a fellow student, Mary Bowie, while both were enrolled in graduate studies at Berkeley. Mary Bowie Hilton died in 2007. A daughter survives them.
