= Institute of Valencia de Don Juan =

Museum and library in Madrid, Spain

- Instituto Valencia de Don Juan (Spanish)
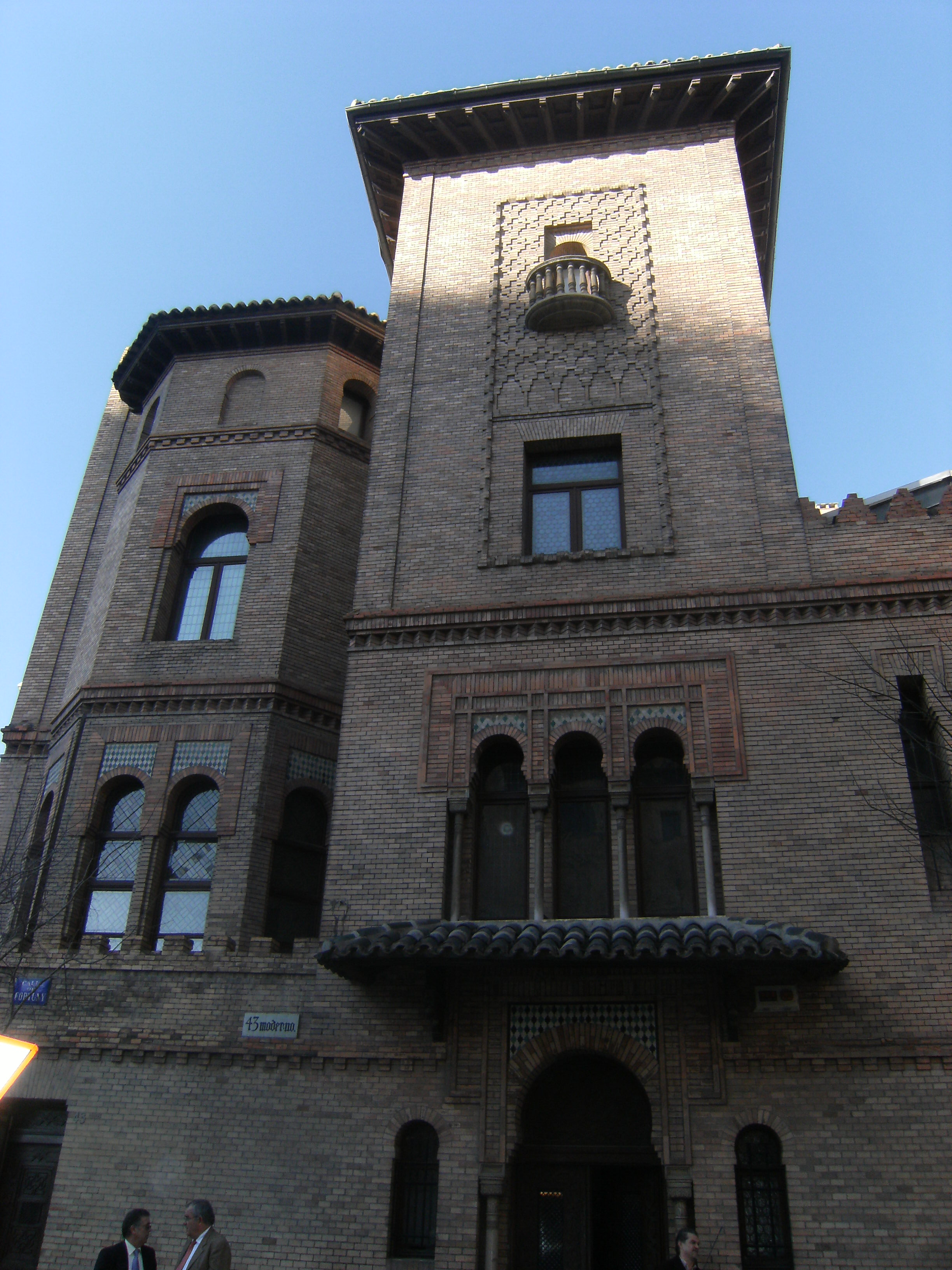

- Location within Spain
- 40°26′0″N 3°41′25″W
- Location: Madrid, Spain

Spanish Cultural Heritage
- Official name: Instituto Valencia de Don Juan
- Type: Non-movable
- Criteria: Monument
- Designated: 1981
- Reference no.: RI-51-0004497

The Institute Valencia of Don Juan (Spanish: Instituto Valencia de Don Juan) is a museum, library and research centre in Madrid, Spain, dedicated to the study of Spanish history, art, and material culture. It was founded in 1916 by diplomat and archaeologist Guillermo de Osma and his wife Adelaida Crooke y Guzmán, to preserve their art collections and promote scholarly study. The building, known as the Palacio de Osma, was declared a Site of Cultural Interest in 1981.

== Museum ==
In 1916 Guillermo de Osma y Scull, a diplomat and archaeologist, and his wife, Adelaida Crooke y Guzmán (24th Countess de Valencia de Don Juan), founded the Valencia de Don Juan Institute to preserve and expand the decorative art collections they had assembled or inherited, throughout their lives, as well as promote Spain's foreign relations in the field of archaeology.

On 15 March 1916 a notary formally established the Institute; the Board of Trustees included Prime minister Antonio Maura, scholar Miguel Asín Palacios, Spanish peer Jacobo Fitz-James Stuart y Falcó, American philanthropist and scholar Archer Milton Huntington and British archaeologist Sir Charles Hercules Read.

The Institute is located in the couple's mansion, the Palacio de Osma, a Site of cultural interest since 1981. The mansion is a Neo-Mudéjar building which was designed by Enrique Fort y Guyenet in 1886, and its exterior walls include azulejo tiles made by Daniel Zuloaga.

The Institute has 710 medieval documents (dated between 875 and 1500) in its archives, as well as art history collections in its library. One collection contains 40,000 documents, dating to as early as the Catholic Monarchs era, with a particular emphasis on the reign of Philip II. The Institute also houses one of the world's most important collections of Andalusian art.

In 1920, de Osma endowed the University of Oxford with £2,110 to establish the De Osma Studentship, a scholarship for the study of Spanish at the Institute.

== Legacy ==
Mery Jiménez Heredia of Revista COSAS Perú called the Valencia de Don Juan Institute "one of the most important private foundations of decorative-industrial arts in Spain". According to the Instituto Cervantes in London: "Osma's legacy [...] remains active in his eagerness to break stereotypes and promote ties between Oxford and Spain."
