= First government of the Count of Romanones =

1st government of the Count of Romanones
- Government of Spain
- 1912
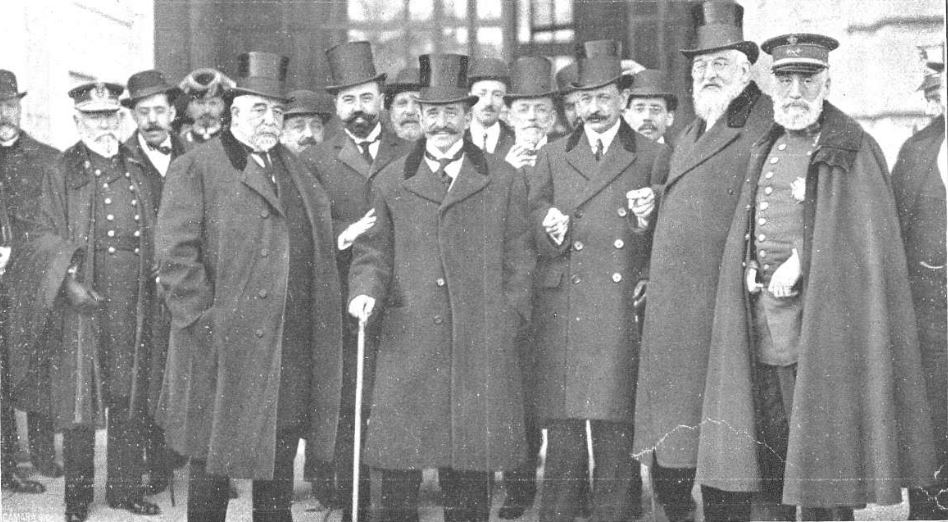
- The government in November 1912
- Date formed: 14 November 1912
- Date dissolved: 31 December 1912

People and organisations
- Monarch: Alfonso XIII
- Prime Minister: Álvaro de Figueroa, Count of Romanones
- No. of ministers: 8 (Note: Does not include the prime minister.)
- Total no. of members: 8
- Member party: Liberal
- Status in legislature: Majority (single-party)
- Opposition party: Conservative
- Opposition leader: Antonio Maura

History
- Predecessor: Canalejas III
- Successor: Romanones II

The first government of Álvaro de Figueroa, Count of Romanones, was formed on 14 November 1912, following the latter's appointment as prime minister of Spain by King Alfonso XIII and his swearing-in that same day, as a result of José Canalejas's assassination on 12 November. It succeeded the third Canalejas government and was the government of Spain from 14 November 1912 to 31 December 1912, a total of 47 days, or 1 month and 17 days.

The cabinet, which except for the prime minister was the same as the last one under Canalejas, comprised members of the Liberal Party and two military officers.

== Formation ==
=== Overview ===
The Spanish Constitution of 1876 enshrined Spain as a semi-constitutional monarchy during the Restoration period, awarding the monarch—under the royal prerogative—the power to appoint government members (including the prime minister); the ability to grant or deny the decree of dissolution of the Cortes, or the adjournment of legislative sessions, to the incumbent or aspiring government that requested it; and the capacity to inform, inspect and ultimately control executive acts by granting or denying the signature of royal decrees; among others.

The monarch would play a key role in the turno system by appointing and dismissing governments, which would then organize elections to provide themselves with a parliamentary majority. As a result, governments during this period were dependent on royal confidence, which was frequently secured or lost based on the leaders' ability to guarantee the internal unity and parliamentary cohesion of their parties. In practice, the royal prerogative was not exercised freely by the monarch, but was carried out through the opening of a round of consultations—with the presidents of the chambers, the leaders of the main parties, the potential candidates and other notable figures—prior to government formation, or when prime ministers raised a matter of confidence to the monarch.

=== Cabinet crisis ===
Prime Minister José Canalejas was assassinated in Puerta del Sol by anarchist Manuel Pardiñas on 12 November 1912. As a result, King Alfonso XIII temporarily entrusted Minister of State, the Marquis of Alhucemas, to serve the duties of the prime minister's office in an interim capacity, while immediately opening a round of consultations with the two main parties in order to provide for a more permanent solution to fill the power vacuum left by Canalejas's death.

Consultations; King of Spain
Date	Consultee	Office/position	Party
12 November 1912	Council of Ministers	Ministers	Liberal
12 November 1912	Count of Romanones	President of the Congress of Deputies	Liberal
12 November 1912	Eugenio Montero Ríos	President of the Senate; Prime Minister (former)	Liberal
12 November 1912	Segismundo Moret	Prime Minister (former); Leader of the Liberal Party (former)	Liberal
12 November 1912	Antonio Maura	Leader of the Conservative Party; Prime Minister (former)	Conservative
12 November 1912	Marcelo Azcárraga	Prime Minister (former); President of the Senate (former)	Conservative
12 November 1912	Eduardo Dato	President of the Congress of Deputies (former)	Conservative
12 November 1912	2nd Marquis of Pidal	President of the Senate (former)	Conservative
12 November 1912	Alejandro Pidal y Mon	President of the Congress of Deputies (former)	Conservative
13 November 1912	Segismundo Moret	Prime Minister (former); Leader of the Liberal Party (former)	Liberal
13 November 1912	Eugenio Montero Ríos	President of the Senate; Prime Minister (former)	Liberal
14 November 1912	Marquis of Alhucemas	Prime Minister (acting)	Liberal
14 November 1912	Count of Romanones	President of the Congress of Deputies	Liberal
Nominations
Outcome →	Nomination of Segismundo Moret (Liberal) No Declined; Nomination of Eugenio Montero Ríos (Liberal) No Declined; Nomination of the Marquis of Alhucemas (Liberal) No Declined; Nomination of the Count of Romanones (Liberal) Accepted		

The first round of consultations (held on the same day of the assassination) saw both Conservative and Liberal leaders, as well as the Council of Ministers, recommending Alfonso XIII a continuation of the incumbent Liberal cabinet under a prime minister from outside the government, for—at least—as long as a new budget for 1913 could be approved and the recently negotiated Treaty between France and Spain regarding Morocco could be signed. The King, allegedly, had offered both Segismundo Moret and Eugenio Montero Ríos to head a cabinet the next day, but both had declined the offer. New consultations on 14 November with both the Marquis of Alhucemas and the Count of Romanones led to the latter being tasked to resolve outstanding issues, heading a transitional government that comprised the ministers of the previous cabinet under Canalejas.

== Council of Ministers ==
The Council of Ministers was structured into the office for the prime minister and eight ministries.

← Romanones I Government → (14 November 1912 – 31 December 1912)
Portfolio	Name	Party	Took office	Left office	Ref.
Prime Minister	Count of Romanones	Liberal	14 November 1912	31 December 1912	
Minister of State	Marquis of Alhucemas	Liberal	3 April 1911	31 December 1912	
Minister of Grace and Justice	Diego Arias de Miranda	Liberal	12 March 1912	31 December 1912	
Minister of War	Agustín de Luque	Military	3 April 1911	31 December 1912	
Minister of the Navy	José Pidal Rebollo	Military	3 April 1911	31 December 1912	
Minister of Finance	Juan Navarro Reverter	Liberal	12 March 1912	31 December 1912	
Minister of Governance	Antonio Barroso y Castillo	Liberal	29 June 1911	31 December 1912	
Minister of Public Instruction and Fine Arts	Santiago Alba	Liberal	12 March 1912	31 December 1912	
Minister of Development	Miguel Villanueva	Liberal	12 March 1912	31 December 1912	

== Bibliography ==
- Constitución de la Monarquía Española (PDF) (Constitution). Madrid Gazette (in Spanish). King of Spain. 30 June 1876.
- Soldevilla, Fernando (1913). El Año Político 1912 (in Spanish). Madrid: National Library of Spain.
- Calero, Antonio María (1987). "La prerrogativa regia en la Restauración: teoría y práctica (1875-1902)" (PDF). Revista de Estudios Políticos (in Spanish) (55). Madrid: Centre for Political and Constitutional Studies: 273–315. ISSN 0048-7694.
- Martorell Linares, Miguel Ángel (1997). "La crisis parlamentaria de 1913-1917. La quiebra del sistema de relaciones parlamentarias de la Restauración" (PDF). Revista de Estudios Políticos (in Spanish) (96). Madrid: Centre for Political and Constitutional Studies: 137–161. ISSN 0048-7694.

Preceded by Canalejas III	Government of Spain; 1912	Succeeded by Romanones II
