= Third government of José Canalejas =

3rd government of José Canalejas
- Government of Spain
- 1911–1912
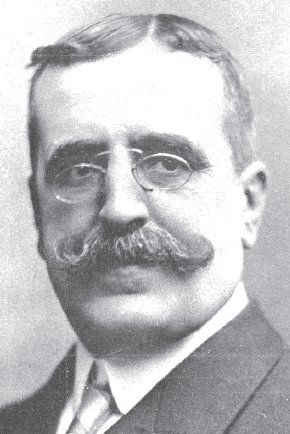
- Canalejas circa 1912
- Date formed: 3 April 1911
- Date dissolved: 14 November 1912

People and organisations
- Monarch: Alfonso XIII
- Prime Minister: José Canalejas (1911–Nov 1912); Marquis of Alhucemas (Nov 1912; acting)
- No. of ministers: 8 (Note: Does not include the prime minister.)
- Total no. of members: 12
- Member party: Liberal
- Status in legislature: Majority (single-party)
- Opposition party: Conservative
- Opposition leader: Antonio Maura

History
- Predecessor: Canalejas II
- Successor: Romanones I

The third government of José Canalejas was formed on 3 April 1911, following the latter's appointment as prime minister of Spain by King Alfonso XIII and his swearing-in that same day, as a result of his own resignation from the post on 1 April over the parliamentary proceedings on the Ferrer case. It succeeded the second Canalejas government and was the government of Spain from 3 April 1911 to 14 November 1912, a total of 591 days, or 1 year, 7 months and 11 days.

The cabinet comprised members of the Liberal Party and two military officers. It was disestablished as a consequence of Canalejas's assassination on 12 November 1912, with the Marquis of Alhucemas serving as prime minister in interim capacity and the rest of the cabinet ministers remaining in place until the next government was sworn in.

== Formation ==
=== Overview ===
The Spanish Constitution of 1876 enshrined Spain as a semi-constitutional monarchy during the Restoration period, awarding the monarch—under the royal prerogative—the power to appoint government members (including the prime minister); the ability to grant or deny the decree of dissolution of the Cortes, or the adjournment of legislative sessions, to the incumbent or aspiring government that requested it; and the capacity to inform, inspect and ultimately control executive acts by granting or denying the signature of royal decrees; among others.

The monarch would play a key role in the turno system by appointing and dismissing governments, which would then organize elections to provide themselves with a parliamentary majority. As a result, governments during this period were dependent on royal confidence, which was frequently secured or lost based on the leaders' ability to guarantee the internal unity and parliamentary cohesion of their parties. In practice, the royal prerogative was not exercised freely by the monarch, but was carried out through the opening of a round of consultations—with the presidents of the chambers, the leaders of the main parties, the potential candidates and other notable figures—prior to government formation, or when prime ministers raised a matter of confidence to the monarch.

=== Cabinet crisis ===
On 1 April 1911, José Canalejas raised a matter of confidence to King Alfonso XIII by submitting his resignation and that of his government over the issue of the "Ferrer case": an attempt by republican parties to posthumously rehabilitate anarchist activist Francisco Ferrer by having the Congress of Deputies review the military ruling that ordered his execution, causing differences between several cabinet ministers regarding how to proceed.

Consultations; King of Spain
Date	Consultee	Office/position	Party
2 April 1911	José Canalejas	Prime Minister; Leader of the Liberal Party	Liberal
Nominations
Outcome →	Nomination of José Canalejas (Liberal) Accepted		

The King reaffirmed his confidence in Canalejas on 2 April without any further consultation, on the condition that he could still muster a parliamentary majority in the Cortes and defend the position of the Spanish Army:

Spanish: "Yo he deseado desde el primer momento muy sinceramente que se desenvuelva la política liberal, por considerarla útil a los intereses de la nación. Usted sabe que ha tenido y tiene mi confianza, siempre que cuente usted oon la de la mayoría de las Cámaras. [...] Pues a continuar su política y a desenvolverla en la normalidad del régimen parlamentario, y constituya usted el Gobierno en los términos que considere más convenientes." [...] Su Majestad el Rey, al reiterar sus poderes al señor Canalejas, indicó la condición de seguir el debate de Ferrer y de defender enérgicamente al Ejército. ["From the very beginning, I have sincerely hoped for the development of the Liberal policy, considering it useful to the nation's interests. You know that you have had and continue to have my trust, as long as you have the support of the majority of the chambers. [...] So continue your policy and develop it in the normality of the parliamentary regime, and form the Government in the terms that you consider most convenient." [...] His Majesty the King, in reiterating his powers to Mr. Canalejas, indicated the condition of following the Ferrer debate and vigorously defending the Army.]

— King Alfonso XIII to José Canalejas during the resolution of the matter of confidence, in Fernando Soldevilla, El Año Político 1911 (1912).

The new cabinet—sworn in the next day—comprised members of the Liberal Party as well as two military officers, and saw changes in the Grace and Justice, War, Navy, Finance, Governance and Public Instruction ministries.

== Cabinet changes ==
Canalejas's third government saw a number of cabinet changes during its tenure:

- On 20 May 1911, Trinitario Ruiz Valarino resigned as governance minister citing "weakness in the state of his spirit", though rumours suggested internal disagreements or discontent. Nonetheless, Valarino's resignation was not formalized until 29 June, with Minister of Grace and Justice Antonio Barroso y Castillo taking on the ordinary discharge of duties in the meantime. Barroso ended up being appointed as Valarino's replacement at the helm of the Governance ministry, with Canalejas himself directly assuming the vacancy in the ministry of Grace and Justice.
- On 12 March 1912, Canalejas conducted a major cabinet reshuffle that affected four ministries: Grace and Justice, which was separated again from the position of prime minister and went to Diego Arias de Miranda; Finance, which saw the exit of Tirso Rodrigáñez over divergences in economic matters and his replacement by Juan Navarro Reverter; Instruction and Fine Arts, which saw Santiago Alba replacing Amalio Gimeno; and the exit of Rafael Gasset from the Development portfolio out of his wish to avoid becoming a target of Conservative criticism, being replaced by Miguel Villanueva at the helm of the ministry.

== Council of Ministers ==
The Council of Ministers was structured into the office for the prime minister and eight ministries.

← Canalejas III Government → (3 April 1911 – 14 November 1912)
Portfolio	Name	Party	Took office	Left office	Ref.
Prime Minister	José Canalejas	Liberal	3 April 1911	29 June 1911	
Minister of State	Marquis of Alhucemas	Liberal	3 April 1911	31 December 1912	
Minister of Grace and Justice	Antonio Barroso y Castillo	Liberal	3 April 1911	29 June 1911	
Minister of War	Agustín de Luque	Military	3 April 1911	31 December 1912	
Minister of the Navy	José Pidal Rebollo	Military	3 April 1911	31 December 1912	
Minister of Finance	Tirso Rodrigáñez	Liberal	3 April 1911	12 March 1912	
Minister of Governance	Trinitario Ruiz Valarino	Liberal	3 April 1911	23 May 1911	
Minister of Public Instruction and Fine Arts	Amalio Gimeno	Liberal	3 April 1911	12 March 1912	
Minister of Development	Rafael Gasset	Liberal	3 April 1911	12 March 1912	
=== Changes May 1911 ===
Portfolio	Name	Party	Took office	Left office	Ref.
Minister of Governance	Antonio Barroso y Castillo took on the ordinary discharge of duties from 23 May to 29 June 1911.				
=== Changes June 1911 ===
Portfolio	Name	Party	Took office	Left office	Ref.
Prime Minister; Minister of Grace and Justice	José Canalejas	Liberal	29 June 1911	12 March 1912	
Minister of Governance	Antonio Barroso y Castillo	Liberal	29 June 1911	31 December 1912	
=== Changes March 1912 ===
Portfolio	Name	Party	Took office	Left office	Ref.
Prime Minister	José Canalejas	Liberal	12 March 1912	12 November 1912†	
Minister of Grace and Justice	Diego Arias de Miranda	Liberal	12 March 1912	31 December 1912	
Minister of Finance	Juan Navarro Reverter	Liberal	12 March 1912	31 December 1912	
Minister of Public Instruction and Fine Arts	Santiago Alba	Liberal	12 March 1912	31 December 1912	
Minister of Development	Miguel Villanueva	Liberal	12 March 1912	31 December 1912	
=== Changes November 1912 ===
Portfolio	Name	Party	Took office	Left office	Ref.
Prime Minister	The Marquis of Alhucemas served in acting capacity from 12 to 14 November 1912.				

== Bibliography ==
- Constitución de la Monarquía Española (PDF) (Constitution). Madrid Gazette (in Spanish). King of Spain. 30 June 1876.
- Soldevilla, Fernando (1912). El Año Político 1911 (in Spanish). Madrid: National Library of Spain.
- Soldevilla, Fernando (1913). El Año Político 1912 (in Spanish). Madrid: National Library of Spain.
- Calero, Antonio María (1987). "La prerrogativa regia en la Restauración: teoría y práctica (1875-1902)" (PDF). Revista de Estudios Políticos (in Spanish) (55). Madrid: Centre for Political and Constitutional Studies: 273–315. ISSN 0048-7694.
- Martorell Linares, Miguel Ángel (1997). "La crisis parlamentaria de 1913-1917. La quiebra del sistema de relaciones parlamentarias de la Restauración" (PDF). Revista de Estudios Políticos (in Spanish) (96). Madrid: Centre for Political and Constitutional Studies: 137–161. ISSN 0048-7694.

Preceded by Canalejas II	Government of Spain; 1911–1912	Succeeded by Romanones I
