= Third government of Segismundo Moret =

3rd government of Segismundo Moret
- Government of Spain
- 1909–1910
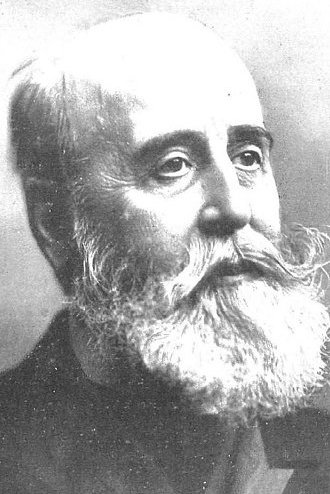
- Moret before 1909
- Date formed: 21 October 1909
- Date dissolved: 9 February 1910

People and organisations
- Monarch: Alfonso XIII
- Prime Minister: Segismundo Moret
- No. of ministers: 7 (Note: Does not include the prime minister.)
- Total no. of members: 7
- Member parties: Liberal
- Status in legislature: Minority (single-party)
- Opposition party: Conservative
- Opposition leader: Antonio Maura

History
- Predecessor: Maura II
- Successor: Canalejas I

The third government of Segismundo Moret was formed on 21 October 1909, following the latter's appointment as prime minister of Spain by King Alfonso XIII and his swearing-in that same day, as a result of Antonio Maura's resignation from the post on 21 October amid the political fallout from the Tragic Week and Francisco Ferrer's execution. It succeeded the second Maura government and was the government of Spain from 21 October 1909 to 9 February 1910, a total of 111 days, or 3 months and 19 days.

The cabinet comprised members of the Liberal Party and two military officers. It resigned on 9 February 1910 as a consequence of an internal crisis within the Liberals over the issue of collabotation with republican parties seeing Moret disavowed by leading party figures and the King himself, serving until the next government was sworn in.

== Formation ==
=== Overview ===
The Spanish Constitution of 1876 enshrined Spain as a semi-constitutional monarchy during the Restoration period, awarding the monarch—under the royal prerogative—the power to appoint government members (including the prime minister); the ability to grant or deny the decree of dissolution of the Cortes, or the adjournment of legislative sessions, to the incumbent or aspiring government that requested it; and the capacity to inform, inspect and ultimately control executive acts by granting or denying the signature of royal decrees; among others.

The monarch would play a key role in the turno system by appointing and dismissing governments, which would then organize elections to provide themselves with a parliamentary majority. As a result, governments during this period were dependent on royal confidence, which was frequently secured or lost based on the leaders' ability to guarantee the internal unity and parliamentary cohesion of their parties. In practice, the royal prerogative was not exercised freely by the monarch, but was carried out through the opening of a round of consultations—with the presidents of the chambers, the leaders of the main parties, the potential candidates and other notable figures—prior to government formation, or when prime ministers raised a matter of confidence to the monarch.

=== Cabinet crisis ===
In July 1909, a decision by Antonio Maura's government to mobilize reservists from Barcelona for the second Melillan campaign unleashed a wave of anti-war unrest among the working class—motivated by anger at wealthier families being able to "exempt" their offspring from military service by paying a fee (the redención en metálico or "cash redemption") or by hiring a replacement ("substitution")—that reached its peak during the events of the Tragic Week. The state's heavy-handed response (with over 100 killed and 1,700 arrested in the riots and a two-month suspension of constitutional rights across the country) and the execution of anarchist activist Francisco Ferrer on 13 October sparked widespread outrage, with the scale of the international outcry being compared to that of the Dreyfus affair.

During a heated parliamentary debate in Congress between 18 and 20 October, Governance Minister Juan de la Cierva aggressively accused the Liberals under Segismundo Moret of attempting to incite a revolution over their criticism of Maura's management of the situation, with a handshake from Maura to La Cierva being interpreted as a gesture of approval from the former. The Liberals protested to the president of the Congress of Deputies, Eduardo Dato, arguing that La Cierva's accusations put them outside the system and ruling that the episode meant a complete breakdown of relations with the government. The liberal and pro-monarchy newspaper El Imparcial published an editorial titled "Can the Liberals be monarchists?", in which it denounced the parliamentary episode the previous day as "a very serious situation" and defended the fundamental role of the Liberal Party in maintaining the Restoration regime; it also demanded clear evidence "that proves that the Monarchy has not dispensed with the Liberal Party".

On 21 October, Maura, having been informed of the Liberal position to sever all relations with his government, went to the Royal Palace and raised a matter of confidence to King Alfonso XIII by submitting his resignation and that of his cabinet. A round of consultations ensued the same day, with Maura allegedly expecting the King to reject his resignation and ask him to form a new cabinet.

Consultations; King of Spain
Date	Consultee	Office/position	Party
21 October 1909	Segismundo Moret	Leader of the Liberal Party; Prime Minister (former)	Liberal
21 October 1909	Marcelo Azcárraga	President of the Senate; Prime Minister (former)	Conservative
21 October 1909	Eduardo Dato	President of the Congress of Deputies	Conservative
21 October 1909	José López Domínguez	Prime Minister (former); President of the Senate (former)	Military
21 October 1909	José Canalejas	President of the Congress of Deputies (former)	Democratic
21 October 1909	Antonio Maura	Prime Minister; Leader of the Conservative Party	Conservative
Nominations
Outcome →	Nomination of Segismundo Moret (Liberal) Accepted		

Instead, the outcome of the consultations led Alfonso XIII to entrust the formation of a new government to Moret, who accepted the nomination and formed a cabinet—sworn in that same day—comprising members of the Liberal Party as well as two military officers. This episode became the first occasion in the Restoration system that political pressure from the dynastic party in opposition was successful in bringing down the party in power, which would result in Maura declaring the liquidation of the Pact of El Pardo and "implacable hostility" to the Liberals in power.

== Council of Ministers ==
The Council of Ministers was structured into the office for the prime minister and eight ministries.

← Moret III Government → (21 October 1909 – 9 February 1910)
Portfolio	Name	Party	Took office	Left office	Ref.
Prime Minister; Minister of Governance	Segismundo Moret	Liberal	21 October 1909	9 February 1910	
Minister of State	Juan Pérez-Caballero	Liberal	21 October 1909	9 February 1910	
Minister of Grace and Justice	Eduardo Martínez del Campo	Liberal	21 October 1909	9 February 1910	
Minister of War	Agustín de Luque	Military	21 October 1909	9 February 1910	
Minister of the Navy	Víctor María Concas	Military	21 October 1909	9 February 1910	
Minister of Finance	Juan Alvarado y del Saz	Liberal	21 October 1909	9 February 1910	
Minister of Public Instruction and Fine Arts	Antonio Barroso y Castillo	Liberal	21 October 1909	9 February 1910	
Minister of Development	Rafael Gasset	Liberal	21 October 1909	9 February 1910	

== Bibliography ==
- Constitución de la Monarquía Española (PDF) (Constitution). Madrid Gazette (in Spanish). King of Spain. 30 June 1876.
- Soldevilla, Fernando (1910). El Año Político 1909 (in Spanish). Madrid: National Library of Spain.
- Soldevilla, Fernando (1911). El Año Político 1910 (in Spanish). Madrid: National Library of Spain.
- Avrich, Paul (1980). "The Martyrdom of Ferrer". The Modern School Movement: Anarchism and Education in the United States. Princeton: Princeton University Press. pp. 3–33. ISBN 978-0-691-04669-3. OCLC 489692159. Archived from the original on December 24, 2019.
- Robles Egea, Antonio (1982). "Formación de la Conjunción Republicano-Socialista de 1909" (PDF). Revista de Estudios Políticos (in Spanish) (29). Madrid: Centre for Political and Constitutional Studies: 145–161.
- Calero, Antonio María (1987). "La prerrogativa regia en la Restauración: teoría y práctica (1875-1902)" (PDF). Revista de Estudios Políticos (in Spanish) (55). Madrid: Centre for Political and Constitutional Studies: 273–315. ISSN 0048-7694.
- Martorell Linares, Miguel Ángel (1997). "La crisis parlamentaria de 1913-1917. La quiebra del sistema de relaciones parlamentarias de la Restauración" (PDF). Revista de Estudios Políticos (in Spanish) (96). Madrid: Centre for Political and Constitutional Studies: 137–161. ISSN 0048-7694.
- Juliá, Santos (1999). Un siglo de España. Política y sociedad (in Spanish). Madrid: Marcial Pons. pp. 13–76. ISBN 9788495379030.
- Martínez Ruiz, Enrique; Maqueda Abreu, Consuelo; De Diego, Emilio (1999). Atlas histórico de España. El Reinado de Alfonso XIII (1902-1931) (in Spanish). Vol. 2. Bilbao: Ediciones KAL. pp. 121–132. ISBN 9788470903502.
- González, María Jesús (2002). "'Neither God Nor Monster': Antonio Maura and the Failure of Conservative Reformism in Restoration Spain (1893–1923)" (PDF). European History Quarterly. 32 (3). SAGE Publications: 307–334. doi:10.1177/0269142002032003059. ISSN 0265-6914.
- Robles Muñoz, Cristóbal (2009). "¿Acabó la Semana Trágica con Maura? Algunas claves políticas (1906-1909)" (PDF). Analecta Sacra Tarraconensia (in Spanish) (82): 75–114. ISSN 0304-4300.

Preceded by Maura II	Government of Spain; 1909–1910	Succeeded by Canalejas I
