= Government of the Marquis of Vega de Armijo =

- Government of Spain
- 1906–1907
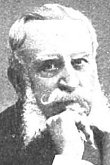
- The Marquis before 1904
- Date formed: 4 December 1906
- Date dissolved: 25 January 1907

People and organisations
- Monarch: Alfonso XIII
- Prime Minister: Antonio Aguilar y Correa, Marquis of Vega de Armijo
- No. of ministers: 8 (Note: Does not include the prime minister.)
- Total no. of members: 8
- Member party: Liberal–Democratic
- Status in legislature: Majority (single-party)
- Opposition party: Conservative
- Opposition leader: Antonio Maura

History
- Predecessor: Moret II
- Successor: Maura II

The government of Antonio Aguilar y Correa, Marquis of Vega de Armijo, was formed on 4 December 1906, following the latter's appointment as prime minister of Spain by King Alfonso XIII on 3 December and his swearing-in the next day, as a result of Segismundo Moret's resignation from the post on 3 December in the wake of the "crisis of the letter" (crisis del papelito). It succeeded the second Moret government and was the government of Spain from 4 December 1906 to 25 January 1907, a total of 52 days, or 1 month and 21 days.

The cabinet comprised members of the Liberal–Democratic alliance and two military officers. With the Liberals deeply divided over the Law of Associations and a proposal to reform consumption taxes, the government collapsed on 23 January, unable to arrange an agreement between the various party factions.

== Formation ==
=== Overview ===
The Spanish Constitution of 1876 enshrined Spain as a semi-constitutional monarchy during the Restoration period, awarding the monarch—under the royal prerogative—the power to appoint government members (including the prime minister); the ability to grant or deny the decree of dissolution of the Cortes, or the adjournment of legislative sessions, to the incumbent or aspiring government that requested it; and the capacity to inform, inspect and ultimately control executive acts by granting or denying the signature of royal decrees; among others.

The monarch would play a key role in the turno system by appointing and dismissing governments, which would then organize elections to provide themselves with a parliamentary majority. As a result, governments during this period were dependent on royal confidence, which was frequently secured or lost based on the leaders' ability to guarantee the internal unity and parliamentary cohesion of their parties. In practice, the royal prerogative was not exercised freely by the monarch, but was carried out through the opening of a round of consultations—with the presidents of the chambers, the leaders of the main parties, the potential candidates and other notable figures—prior to government formation, or when prime ministers raised a matter of confidence to the monarch.

=== Cabinet crisis ===
The political fallout from the "crisis of the letter" (crisis del papelito), which had brought down the previous cabinet under López Domínguez, was instrumental in causing the downfall of Segismundo Moret's second government after only four days in power. Having been rejected by several high-profile Liberal members during the cabinet's formation, internal turmoil within his party—with resignation threats from the presidents of the Congress and Senate (José Canalejas and Eugenio Montero Ríos, respectively) and the tabling of a motion of no confidence in the Senate by members of his own group—forced Moret to preemptively resign on 3 December 1906 to avoid a major parliamentary defeat.

Unlike common practice, and due to the previous round of consultations having been held only five days earlier on 28 November, King Alfonso XIII opted instead for directly summoning prospective prime ministerial candidates to determine a solution to the political crisis arising from Moret's resignation.

Consultations; King of Spain
Date	Consultee	Office/position	Party
3 December 1906	Eugenio Montero Ríos	President of the Senate; Prime Minister (former)	Lib–Dem^{/Dem}
3 December 1906	Marquis of Vega de Armijo	President of the Congress of Deputies (former)	Lib–Dem^{/Dem}
Nominations
Outcome →	Nomination of Eugenio Montero Ríos (Liberal) No Declined; Nomination of the Marquis of Vega de Armijo (Liberal) Accepted		

The outcome of the consultations led Alfonso XIII to entrust the formation of a new government to Eugenio Montero Ríos, who declined the nomination out of his desire to prevent further divisions within the Liberal Party; then to the Marquis of Vega de Armijo, who accepted the nomination. A cabinet comprising members of the Liberal–Democratic alliance and two military officers was formed and sworn in the next day.

== Council of Ministers ==
The Council of Ministers was structured into the office for the prime minister and eight ministries.

← Vega de Armijo Government → (4 December 1906 – 27 January 1907)
Portfolio	Name	Party	Took office	Left office	Ref.
Prime Minister	Marquis of Vega de Armijo	Lib–Dem^{/Dem}	4 December 1906	27 January 1907	
Minister of State	Juan Pérez-Caballero	Lib–Dem^{/Lib}	4 December 1906	27 January 1907	
Minister of Grace and Justice	Antonio Barroso y Castillo	Lib–Dem^{/Dem}	4 December 1906	27 January 1907	
Minister of War	Valeriano Weyler	Military	4 December 1906	27 January 1907	
Minister of the Navy	The Marquis of Vega de Armijo took on the ordinary discharge of duties from 4 to 9 December 1906.				
Minister of Finance	Juan Navarro Reverter	Lib–Dem^{/Dem}	4 December 1906	27 January 1907	
Minister of Governance	Count of Romanones	Lib–Dem^{/Lib}	4 December 1906	27 January 1907	
Minister of Public Instruction and Fine Arts	Amalio Gimeno	Lib–Dem^{/Dem}	4 December 1906	27 January 1907	
Minister of Development	Francisco de Federico	Lib–Dem^{/Dem}	4 December 1906	27 January 1907	
=== Changes December 1906 ===
Portfolio	Name	Party	Took office	Left office	Ref.
Minister of the Navy	4th Marquis of the Royal Treasury	Military	9 December 1906	27 January 1907	

== Bibliography ==
- Constitución de la Monarquía Española (PDF) (Constitution). Madrid Gazette (in Spanish). King of Spain. 30 June 1876.
- Soldevilla, Fernando (1907). El Año Político 1906 (in Spanish). Madrid: National Library of Spain.
- Soldevilla, Fernando (1908). El Año Político 1907 (in Spanish). Madrid: National Library of Spain.
- Calero, Antonio María (1987). "La prerrogativa regia en la Restauración: teoría y práctica (1875-1902)" (PDF). Revista de Estudios Políticos (in Spanish) (55). Madrid: Centre for Political and Constitutional Studies: 273–315. ISSN 0048-7694.
- Martorell Linares, Miguel Ángel (1997). "La crisis parlamentaria de 1913-1917. La quiebra del sistema de relaciones parlamentarias de la Restauración" (PDF). Revista de Estudios Políticos (in Spanish) (96). Madrid: Centre for Political and Constitutional Studies: 137–161. ISSN 0048-7694.

Preceded by Moret II	Government of Spain; 1906–1907	Succeeded by Maura II
