= Second government of José Canalejas =

2nd government of José Canalejas
- Government of Spain
- 1911
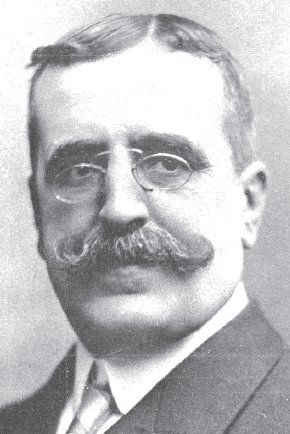
- Canalejas circa 1912
- Date formed: 2 January 1911
- Date dissolved: 3 April 1911

People and organisations
- Monarch: Alfonso XIII
- Prime Minister: José Canalejas
- No. of ministers: 8 (Note: Does not include the prime minister.)
- Total no. of members: 8
- Member party: Liberal
- Status in legislature: Majority (single-party)
- Opposition party: Conservative
- Opposition leader: Antonio Maura

History
- Predecessor: Canalejas I
- Successor: Canalejas III

The second government of José Canalejas was formed on 2 January 1911, following the latter's appointment as prime minister of Spain by King Alfonso XIII and his swearing-in that same day, as a result of his own resignation from the post on 1 January in order to trigger a cabinet reshuffle. It succeeded the first Canalejas government and was the government of Spain from 2 January to 3 April 1911, a total of 91 days, or 3 months and 1 day.

The cabinet comprised members of the Liberal Party and one military officer. Canalejas's triggering of a cabinet crisis was criticized because the government enjoyed political and parliamentary stability at the time and no minister being perceived as having suffered any major misstep. It resigned on 1 April 1911 as a consequence of Canalejas's decision to raise a new matter of confidence to King Alfonso XIII, as a result of the political fallout from the Ferrer case review in parliament and growing disagreements among cabinet members regarding how to proceed, serving until the next government was sworn in.

== Formation ==
=== Overview ===
The Spanish Constitution of 1876 enshrined Spain as a semi-constitutional monarchy during the Restoration period, awarding the monarch—under the royal prerogative—the power to appoint government members (including the prime minister); the ability to grant or deny the decree of dissolution of the Cortes, or the adjournment of legislative sessions, to the incumbent or aspiring government that requested it; and the capacity to inform, inspect and ultimately control executive acts by granting or denying the signature of royal decrees; among others.

The monarch would play a key role in the turno system by appointing and dismissing governments, which would then organize elections to provide themselves with a parliamentary majority. As a result, governments during this period were dependent on royal confidence, which was frequently secured or lost based on the leaders' ability to guarantee the internal unity and parliamentary cohesion of their parties. In practice, the royal prerogative was not exercised freely by the monarch, but was carried out through the opening of a round of consultations—with the presidents of the chambers, the leaders of the main parties, the potential candidates and other notable figures—prior to government formation, or when prime ministers raised a matter of confidence to the monarch.

=== Cabinet crisis ===
Raising a matter of confidence to King Alfonso XIII under the royal prerogative, José Canalejas submitted his resignation and that of his cabinet on 1 January 1911, following the approval of that year's budget and of Canalejas's flagship bill—the "Padlock Law" (ley del candado) restricting the establishment of new religious orders during the next two years—seeking a renewal of the monarch's confidence and a cabinet reshuffle for the new political period.

Consultations; King of Spain
Date	Consultee	Office/position	Party
1 January 1911	José Canalejas	Prime Minister; Leader of the Liberal Party	Liberal
Nominations
Outcome →	Nomination of José Canalejas (Liberal) Accepted		

Alfonso XIII's reaffirmed his confidence in Canalejas without holding any further consultation, and the new cabinet was sworn in on 2 January, comprising members of the Liberal Party and one military officer and seeing changes in the Governance, Public Instruction and Development ministries. Canalejas's triggering of a cabinet crisis was widely seen as unjustified and unnecessary across the entire spectrum, both because the government enjoyed political and parliamentary stability, and because no minister was perceived as having suffered any resounding failure.

== Council of Ministers ==
The Council of Ministers was structured into the office for the prime minister and eight ministries.

← Canalejas II Government → (2 January 1911 – 3 April 1911)
Portfolio	Name	Party	Took office	Left office	Ref.
Prime Minister	José Canalejas	Liberal	2 January 1911	3 April 1911	
Minister of State	Marquis of Alhucemas	Liberal	2 January 1911	3 April 1911	
Minister of Grace and Justice	Trinitario Ruiz Valarino	Liberal	2 January 1911	3 April 1911	
Minister of War	Ángel Aznar y Butigieg	Military	2 January 1911	3 April 1911	
Minister of the Navy	Diego Arias de Miranda	Liberal	2 January 1911	3 April 1911	
Minister of Finance	Eduardo Cobián	Liberal	2 January 1911	3 April 1911	
Minister of Governance	Demetrio Alonso Castrillo	Liberal	2 January 1911	3 April 1911	
Minister of Public Instruction and Fine Arts	Amós Salvador y Rodrigáñez	Liberal	2 January 1911	3 April 1911	
Minister of Development	Rafael Gasset	Liberal	2 January 1911	3 April 1911	

== Bibliography ==
- Constitución de la Monarquía Española (PDF) (Constitution). Madrid Gazette (in Spanish). King of Spain. 30 June 1876.
- Soldevilla, Fernando (1911). El Año Político 1910 (in Spanish). Madrid: National Library of Spain.
- Soldevilla, Fernando (1912). El Año Político 1911 (in Spanish). Madrid: National Library of Spain.
- Calero, Antonio María (1987). "La prerrogativa regia en la Restauración: teoría y práctica (1875-1902)" (PDF). Revista de Estudios Políticos (in Spanish) (55). Madrid: Centre for Political and Constitutional Studies: 273–315. ISSN 0048-7694.
- Martorell Linares, Miguel Ángel (1997). "La crisis parlamentaria de 1913-1917. La quiebra del sistema de relaciones parlamentarias de la Restauración" (PDF). Revista de Estudios Políticos (in Spanish) (96). Madrid: Centre for Political and Constitutional Studies: 137–161. ISSN 0048-7694.

Preceded by Canalejas I	Government of Spain; 1911	Succeeded by Canalejas III
