= First government of José Canalejas =

1st government of José Canalejas
- Government of Spain
- 1910–1911
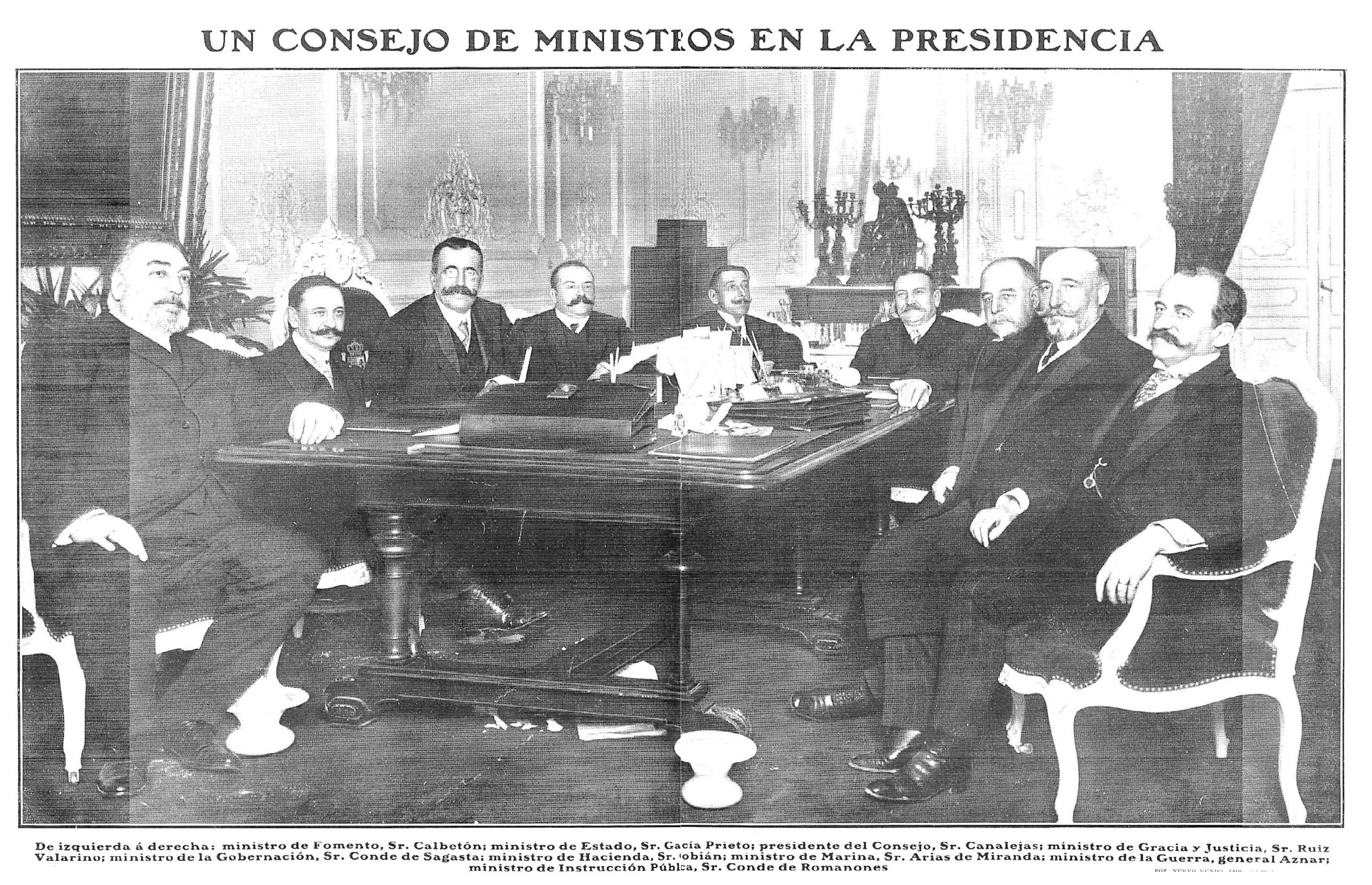
- The government in March 1910
- Date formed: 9 February 1910
- Date dissolved: 2 January 1911

People and organisations
- Monarch: Alfonso XIII
- Prime Minister: José Canalejas
- No. of ministers: 8 (Note: Does not include the prime minister.)
- Total no. of members: 9
- Member party: Democratic (Feb–Jun 1910) (Note: The Monarchist Democratic Party merged into the Liberal Party on 10 June 1910, with José Canalejas becoming its leader on 20 July.); Liberal (Jun 1910–1911)
- Status in legislature: Minority (single-party) (Feb–Jun 1910); Majority (single-party) (Jun 1910–1911)
- Opposition party: Conservative
- Opposition leader: Antonio Maura

History
- Predecessor: Moret III
- Successor: Canalejas II

The first government of José Canalejas was formed on 9 February 1910, following the latter's appointment as prime minister of Spain by King Alfonso XIII and his swearing-in that same day, as a result of Segismundo Moret's dismissal from the post on 9 February over party discontent with the latter's alliance strategy with republican parties. It succeeded the third Moret government and was the government of Spain from 9 February 1910 to 2 January 1911, a total of 327 days, or 10 months and 24 days.

The cabinet comprised members of the Monarchist Democratic Party—which merged into the Liberal Party on 10 June 1910, with Canalejas becoming its leader on 20 July—and one military officer. It resigned on 1 January 1911 as a consequence of Canalejas's decision to raise a matter of confidence to the King and seek a cabinet reshuffle, following what he saw as the fulfillment of the first stage of his premiership, serving until the next government was sworn in.

== Formation ==
=== Overview ===
The Spanish Constitution of 1876 enshrined Spain as a semi-constitutional monarchy during the Restoration period, awarding the monarch—under the royal prerogative—the power to appoint government members (including the prime minister); the ability to grant or deny the decree of dissolution of the Cortes, or the adjournment of legislative sessions, to the incumbent or aspiring government that requested it; and the capacity to inform, inspect and ultimately control executive acts by granting or denying the signature of royal decrees; among others.

The monarch would play a key role in the turno system by appointing and dismissing governments, which would then organize elections to provide themselves with a parliamentary majority. As a result, governments during this period were dependent on royal confidence, which was frequently secured or lost based on the leaders' ability to guarantee the internal unity and parliamentary cohesion of their parties. In practice, the royal prerogative was not exercised freely by the monarch, but was carried out through the opening of a round of consultations—with the presidents of the chambers, the leaders of the main parties, the potential candidates and other notable figures—prior to government formation, or when prime ministers raised a matter of confidence to the monarch.

=== Cabinet crisis ===
Ever since his appointment as prime minister on 21 October 1909, Liberal leader Segismundo Moret had been under continuous public scrutiny over his alleged attempts to establish an electoral alliance with republican parties ahead of the next general election. Discontent within the Liberal Party grew amid fears that any prospective personalist majority centered around Moret could lead to a repetition of the 1905–1907 Liberal period in power, in which internal struggles made political and legislative activity impossible following the downfall of Eugenio Montero Ríos. During a meeting of the Council of Ministers on 3 February 1910, King Alfonso XIII warned against any breakdown of party discipline:

Spanish: "El partido liberal tiene que decidirse a gobernar en España, entendiendo por gobernar no sólo ocupar el Poder, sino acreditar con actos y reformas la significación que le es propia. El partido liberal tiene necesidad de estar unido, de suerte que en él queden ponderados todos sus matices y tendencias, y yo deseo para él una vida larga y fecunda. Dentro de mis funciones, como Rey constitucional, estoy dispuesto á aceptar integramente la obra del partido liberal, y a secundarle para que esta obra responda a un alto sentido de gobierno y a las exigencias del país." ["The Liberal Party must decide to govern in Spain, understanding that governing means not only seizing power, but also demonstrating its inherent significance through actions and reforms. The Liberal Party needs to be united, so that all its nuances and tendencies are fully reflected within it, and I wish it a long and fruitful life. Within my role as constitutional King, I am prepared to fully accept the work of the Liberal Party and to support it so that this work responds to a high sense of government and the demands of the country."]

— King Alfonso XIII to Segismundo Moret in a Council of Ministers meeting on 3 February 1910, in Fernando Soldevilla, El Año Político 1910 (1911).

On 8 February, the Count of Romanones resigned as Liberal leader in the province of Madrid over disagreements with a Moret-sponsored local pact with republican parties in the capital's city council. The public backlash resulting from this episode and the existing divisions within the Liberal Party persuaded the King to deny Moret the signature of the dissolution decree on the next day, blocking the latter from organizing a general election and prompting him to raise a matter of confidence, triggering a cabinet crisis.

Consultations; King of Spain
Date	Consultee	Office/position	Party
9 February 1910	Eugenio Montero Ríos	Prime Minister (former); President of the Senate (former)	Liberal
9 February 1910	José López Domínguez	Prime Minister (former); President of the Senate (former)	Military
9 February 1910	José Canalejas	Leader of the Monarchist Democratic Party; President of the Congress of Deputies (former)	Democratic
9 February 1910	Segismundo Moret	Prime Minister; Leader of the Liberal Party	Liberal
Nominations
Outcome →	Nomination of José Canalejas (Democratic) Accepted		

Consultations were immediately initiated by Alfonso XIII, who summoned Montero Ríos, José López Domínguez and José Canalejas, with the outcome being the de facto dismissal of Moret and Canalejas's nomination to replace him as prime minister. A new cabinet was formed and sworn in on the same day, mostly comprising members of Canalejas's own party (the Monarchist Democratic Party) and one military officer.

== Cabinet changes ==
Canalejas's first government saw a number of cabinet changes during its tenure:

- Julio Burell was appointed to succeed the Count of Romanones as minister of Public Instruction and Fine Arts on 9 June 1910, upon the latter's nomination as candidate for president of the Congress of Deputies. Romanones would be successfully elected to that post on 16 June, with 252 votes in favour.
- On 10 June 1910, after the general election was held, the Monarchist Democratic Party was merged into the Liberal Party, with Canalejas formally becoming the latter's leader on 20 July.

== Council of Ministers ==
The Council of Ministers was structured into the office for the prime minister and eight ministries.

← Canalejas I Government → (9 February 1910 – 2 January 1911)
Portfolio	Name	Party	Took office	Left office	Ref.
Prime Minister	José Canalejas	Democratic	9 February 1910	2 January 1911	
Minister of State	Manuel García Prieto	Democratic	10 February 1910 (Note: Manuel García Prieto and Ángel Aznar y Butigieg were sworn in on 10 February due to being absent.)	2 January 1911	
Minister of Grace and Justice	Trinitario Ruiz Valarino	Democratic	9 February 1910	2 January 1911	
Minister of War	Ángel Aznar y Butigieg	Military	10 February 1910	2 January 1911	
Minister of the Navy	Diego Arias de Miranda	Democratic	9 February 1910	2 January 1911	
Minister of Finance	Eduardo Cobián	Democratic	9 February 1910	2 January 1911	
Minister of Governance	Fernando Merino Villarino	Democratic	9 February 1910	2 January 1911	
Minister of Public Instruction and Fine Arts	Count of Romanones	Democratic	9 February 1910	9 June 1910	
Minister of Development	Fermín Calbetón	Democratic	9 February 1910	2 January 1911	
=== Changes June 1910 ===
Portfolio	Name	Party	Took office	Left office	Ref.
Minister of Public Instruction and Fine Arts	Julio Burell	Democratic	9 June 1910	2 January 1911	

== Bibliography ==
- Constitución de la Monarquía Española (PDF) (Constitution). Madrid Gazette (in Spanish). King of Spain. 30 June 1876.
- Soldevilla, Fernando (1911). El Año Político 1910 (in Spanish). Madrid: National Library of Spain.
- Soldevilla, Fernando (1912). El Año Político 1911 (in Spanish). Madrid: National Library of Spain.
- Calero, Antonio María (1987). "La prerrogativa regia en la Restauración: teoría y práctica (1875-1902)" (PDF). Revista de Estudios Políticos (in Spanish) (55). Madrid: Centre for Political and Constitutional Studies: 273–315. ISSN 0048-7694.
- Martorell Linares, Miguel Ángel (1997). "La crisis parlamentaria de 1913-1917. La quiebra del sistema de relaciones parlamentarias de la Restauración" (PDF). Revista de Estudios Políticos (in Spanish) (96). Madrid: Centre for Political and Constitutional Studies: 137–161. ISSN 0048-7694.

Preceded by Moret III	Government of Spain; 1910–1911	Succeeded by Canalejas II
