= Second government of the Count of Romanones =

2nd government of the Count of Romanones
- Government of Spain
- 1912–1913
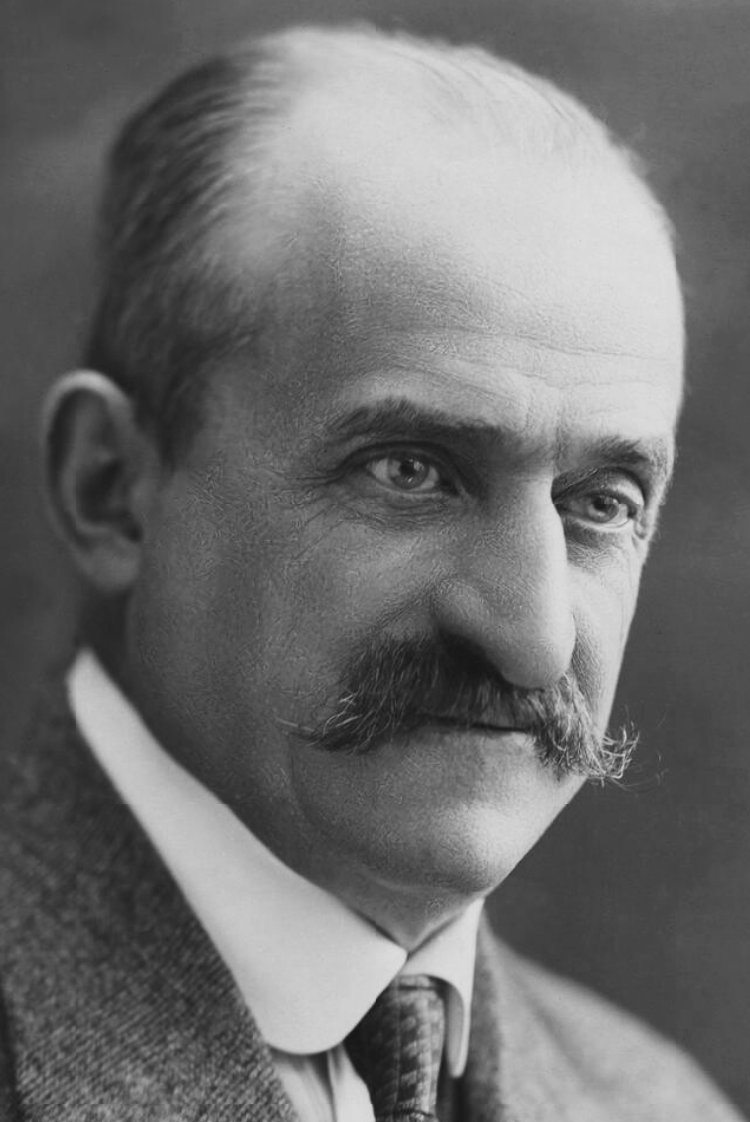
- Romanones in 1919
- Date formed: 31 December 1912
- Date dissolved: 27 October 1913

People and organisations
- Monarch: Alfonso XIII
- Prime Minister: Álvaro de Figueroa, Count of Romanones
- No. of ministers: 8 (Note: Does not include the prime minister.)
- Total no. of members: 11
- Member party: Liberal
- Status in legislature: Majority (single-party)
- Opposition party: Conservative
- Opposition leader: Antonio Maura

History
- Predecessor: Romanones I
- Successor: Dato I

The third government of Álvaro de Figueroa, Count of Romanones, was formed on 31 December 1912, following the latter's appointment as prime minister of Spain by King Alfonso XIII and his swearing-in that same day, as a result of his own resignation from the post on 31 December to trigger a cabinet reshuffle. It succeeded the first Romanones government and was the government of Spain from 31 December 1912 to 27 October 1913, a total of 300 days, or 9 months and 27 days.

The cabinet comprised members of the Liberal Party and one military officer. It was disestablished after it lost a vote of confidence in the Senate on 25 October 1913.

== Formation ==
=== Overview ===
The Spanish Constitution of 1876 enshrined Spain as a semi-constitutional monarchy during the Restoration period, awarding the monarch—under the royal prerogative—the power to appoint government members (including the prime minister); the ability to grant or deny the decree of dissolution of the Cortes, or the adjournment of legislative sessions, to the incumbent or aspiring government that requested it; and the capacity to inform, inspect and ultimately control executive acts by granting or denying the signature of royal decrees; among others.

The monarch would play a key role in the turno system by appointing and dismissing governments, which would then organize elections to provide themselves with a parliamentary majority. As a result, governments during this period were dependent on royal confidence, which was frequently secured or lost based on the leaders' ability to guarantee the internal unity and parliamentary cohesion of their parties. In practice, the royal prerogative was not exercised freely by the monarch, but was carried out through the opening of a round of consultations—with the presidents of the chambers, the leaders of the main parties, the potential candidates and other notable figures—prior to government formation, or when prime ministers raised a matter of confidence to the monarch.

=== Cabinet crisis ===
The signing of the Treaty between France and Spain regarding Morocco on 27 November 1912, its subsequent ratification in the Cortes, and the approval of the 1913 budget, meant that the purpose of the transitional government formed under the Count of Romanones following the assassination of José Canalejas was fulfilled, with the political situation requiring of a more stable government. Conservative elements (under the cover of an intense propaganda campaign led by the conservative press, most notably the newspaper La Época) had persistently advocated for a change in government in favour of party leader Antonio Maura. The internal unity of the Liberal Party—broken since the death of Práxedes Mateo Sagasta in 1903 and only temporarily secured by Canalejas's leadership—was perceived as key for maintaining Alfonso XIII's confidence and, with it, the government; once having secured the support of former leaders and prime ministers Segismundo Moret and Eugenio Montero Ríos, Romanones chose to raise a matter of confidence to the King:

Spanish: "He dado cuenta al Rey de la situación política. Le hice saber que, aprobados los presupuestos y el Tratado con Francia, consideraba yo, como todo el mundo, que la Regia prerrogativa quedaba completamente libre. Por lo tanto, para que de hecho lo estuviera, ponía en sus manos, con la dimisión mía, la dimisión de todo el Gobierno."

["I have informed the King of the political situation. I let him know that, with the budget and the Treaty with France approved, I believed, like everyone else, that the royal prerogative was completely free. Therefore, to ensure that it was effectively free, I placed in his hands, with my resignation, the resignation of the entire Government."]

— The Count of Romanones during the resolution of the matter of confidence, in Fernando Soldevilla, El Año Político 1912 (1913).

Consultations; King of Spain
| Date | Consultee | Office/position | Party |
| 31 December 1912 | Count of Romanones | Prime Minister; President of the Congress of Deputies (former) | Liberal |
Nominations
| Outcome → | Nomination of the Count of Romanones (Liberal) Accepted | | |

Romanones was tasked by King Alfonso XIII with forming a cabinet of his own—based on the fact that the parliamentary majority of his party remained cohesive and that political debates that could lead to a change in policy had not arisen.—and formed a government comprising members of the Liberal Party and one military officer. However, the resolution of the crisis without a proper round of consultations, as well as the King's decision to keep the Liberals in power, was met with outrage by the Conservatives; La Época protested in an editorial that "there were [consultations] in November, following the assassination of Mr. Canalejas, at a time when, pending the approval of the budget and the Treaty with France, the royal prerogative neither had the necessary freedom, nor was it possible for anyone in such circumstances to advise the Monarch on a change of policy, however justified it might be. There were consultations then, when they had almost no purpose, and there haven't been any now, when circumstances have changed". Maura himself was personally disappointed with the outcome, with the political situation seeing the culmination of his break with the turno system.

== Vote of confidence ==
Motion of confidence Senate; Confidence in the Government (Ángel Pulido)
| Ballot → | 25 October 1913 |
| Required majority → | Simple |
| Yes: • Liberals (100); • Independents (2) | 102 / 360 |
| No: • Conservatives (59); • Liberal Democrats (45); • Independents (2); • Carlists (1) | 107 / 360 |
| Not voting | 151 / 360 |

== Council of Ministers ==
The Council of Ministers was structured into the office for the prime minister and eight ministries.

← Romanones II Government → (31 December 1912 – 27 October 1913)
| Portfolio | Name | Party | Took office | Left office | Ref. |
| Prime Minister | Count of Romanones | Liberal | 31 December 1912 | 24 May 1913 | |
| Minister of State | Juan Navarro Reverter | Liberal | 31 December 1912 | 13 June 1913 | |
| Minister of Grace and Justice | Antonio Barroso y Castillo | Liberal | 31 December 1912 | 24 May 1913 | |
| Minister of War | Agustín de Luque | Military | 31 December 1912 | 27 October 1913 | |
| Minister of the Navy | Amalio Gimeno | Liberal | 31 December 1912 | 27 October 1913 | |
| Minister of Finance | Félix Suárez-Inclán | Liberal | 31 December 1912 | 27 October 1913 | |
| Minister of Governance | Santiago Alba | Liberal | 31 December 1912 | 27 October 1913 | |
| Minister of Public Instruction and Fine Arts | Antonio López Muñoz | Liberal | 31 December 1912 | 13 June 1913 | |
| Minister of Development | Miguel Villanueva | Liberal | 31 December 1912 | 24 May 1913 | |
=== Changes May 1913 ===
| Portfolio | Name | Party | Took office | Left office | Ref. |
| Prime Minister; Minister of Grace and Justice | Count of Romanones | Liberal | 24 May 1913 | 13 June 1913 | |
| Minister of Development | Rafael Gasset | Liberal | 24 May 1913 | 27 October 1913 | |
=== Changes June 1913 ===
| Portfolio | Name | Party | Took office | Left office | Ref. |
| Prime Minister | Count of Romanones | Liberal | 13 June 1913 | 27 October 1913 | |
| Minister of State | Antonio López Muñoz | Liberal | 13 June 1913 | 27 October 1913 | |
| Minister of Grace and Justice | Pedro Rodríguez de la Borbolla | Liberal | 13 June 1913 | 27 October 1913 | |
| Minister of Public Instruction and Fine Arts | Joaquín Ruiz Jiménez | Liberal | 13 June 1913 | 27 October 1913 | |

== Bibliography ==
- Constitución de la Monarquía Española (PDF) (Constitution). Madrid Gazette (in Spanish). King of Spain. 30 June 1876.
- Soldevilla, Fernando (1913). El Año Político 1912 (in Spanish). Madrid: National Library of Spain.
- Soldevilla, Fernando (1914). El Año Político 1913 (in Spanish). Madrid: National Library of Spain.
- Calero, Antonio María (1987). "La prerrogativa regia en la Restauración: teoría y práctica (1875-1902)" (PDF). Revista de Estudios Políticos (in Spanish) (55). Madrid: Centre for Political and Constitutional Studies: 273–315. ISSN 0048-7694.
- Martorell Linares, Miguel Ángel (1997). "La crisis parlamentaria de 1913-1917. La quiebra del sistema de relaciones parlamentarias de la Restauración" (PDF). Revista de Estudios Políticos (in Spanish) (96). Madrid: Centre for Political and Constitutional Studies: 137–161. ISSN 0048-7694.

| Preceded by Romanones I | Government of Spain; 1912–1913 | Succeeded by Dato I |
