= Government of José López Domínguez =

- Government of Spain
- 1906
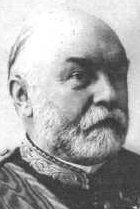
- López Domínguez in 1897
- Date formed: 6 July 1906
- Date dissolved: 30 November 1906

People and organisations
- Monarch: Alfonso XIII
- Prime Minister: José López Domínguez
- No. of ministers: 7 (Note: Does not include the prime minister.)
- Total no. of members: 8
- Member party: Liberal–Democratic
- Status in legislature: Majority (single-party)
- Opposition party: Conservative
- Opposition leader: Antonio Maura

History
- Predecessor: Moret I
- Successor: Moret II

The government of José López Domínguez was formed on 6 July 1906, following the latter's appointment as prime minister of Spain by King Alfonso XIII on 5 July and his swearing-in the next day, as a result of Segismundo Moret being dismissed from the post on 5 July over the "dissolution crisis" (crisis de la disolución): the King's rejection to grant him a dissolution decree to call a snap election. It succeeded the first Moret government and was the government of Spain from 6 July to 30 November 1906, a total of 147 days, or 4 months and 24 days.

The cabinet comprised members of the Liberal–Democratic alliance and one military officer (López Domínguez himself). The government was disestablished following internal divisions within the Liberals over a new Law of Associations—promoted by José Canalejas and criticized by the Catholic Church as "anti-clerical"—intending to address the problem of religious orders. In what came to be known as the "slip paper" crisis (crisis del papelito), Moret had sent a letter to the King surreptitiously warning him against the Law's perceived dangers, displeasing the monarch and prompting López Domínguez's resignation.

== Formation ==
=== Overview ===
The Spanish Constitution of 1876 enshrined Spain as a semi-constitutional monarchy during the Restoration period, awarding the monarch—under the royal prerogative—the power to appoint government members (including the prime minister); the ability to grant or deny the decree of dissolution of the Cortes, or the adjournment of legislative sessions, to the incumbent or aspiring government that requested it; and the capacity to inform, inspect and ultimately control executive acts by granting or denying the signature of royal decrees; among others.

The monarch would play a key role in the turno system by appointing and dismissing governments, which would then organize elections to provide themselves with a parliamentary majority. As a result, governments during this period were dependent on royal confidence, which was frequently secured or lost based on the leaders' ability to guarantee the internal unity and parliamentary cohesion of their parties. In practice, the royal prerogative was not exercised freely by the monarch, but was carried out through the opening of a round of consultations—with the presidents of the chambers, the leaders of the main parties, the potential candidates and other notable figures—prior to government formation, or when prime ministers raised a matter of confidence to the monarch.

=== Consultations ===
King Alfonso XIII held a round of consultations on 4–5 July 1906 to determine a solution to the political crisis arising from Moret's intent to trigger a parliamentary dissolution.

Consultations; King of Spain
Date	Consultee	Office/position	Party
4 July 1906	José López Domínguez	President of the Senate	Military
4 July 1906	José Canalejas	President of the Congress of Deputies	Lib–Dem^{/Dem}
4 July 1906	Marquis of Vega de Armijo	President of the Congress of Deputies (former)	Lib–Dem^{/Dem}
4 July 1906	Segismundo Moret	Prime Minister; Leader of the Liberal Party	Lib–Dem^{/Lib}
5 July 1906	Council of Ministers	Ministers	Lib–Dem
5 July 1906	José López Domínguez	President of the Senate	Military
Nominations
Outcome →	Nomination of José López Domínguez (Liberal) Accepted		

The outcome of the consultations led Alfonso XIII to entrust the formation of a new government to José López Domínguez, who accepted the nomination.

== Council of Ministers ==
The Council of Ministers was structured into the office for the prime minister and eight ministries.

← López Domínguez Government → (6 July – 30 November 1906)
Portfolio	Name	Party	Took office	Left office	Ref.
Prime Minister; Minister of War	José López Domínguez	Military	6 July 1906	15 October 1906	
Minister of State	Pío Gullón	Lib–Dem^{/Dem}	6 July 1906	30 November 1906	
Minister of Grace and Justice	Count of Romanones	Lib–Dem^{/Lib}	6 July 1906	30 November 1906	
Minister of the Navy	Juan Alvarado y del Saz	Lib–Dem^{/Dem}	6 July 1906	30 November 1906	
Minister of Finance	Juan Navarro Reverter	Lib–Dem^{/Dem}	6 July 1906	30 November 1906	
Minister of Governance	Bernabé Dávila	Lib–Dem^{/Lib}	6 July 1906	30 November 1906	
Minister of Public Instruction and Fine Arts	Amalio Gimeno	Lib–Dem^{/Dem}	6 July 1906	30 November 1906	
Minister of Development	Manuel García Prieto	Lib–Dem^{/Dem}	6 July 1906	30 November 1906	
=== Changes October 1906 ===
Portfolio	Name	Party	Took office	Left office	Ref.
Prime Minister	José López Domínguez	Military	15 October 1906	30 November 1906	
Minister of War	Agustín de Luque	Military	15 October 1906	30 November 1906	

== Bibliography ==
- Constitución de la Monarquía Española (PDF) (Constitution). Madrid Gazette (in Spanish). King of Spain. 30 June 1876.
- Soldevilla, Fernando (1907). El Año Político 1906 (in Spanish). Madrid: National Library of Spain.
- Calero, Antonio María (1987). "La prerrogativa regia en la Restauración: teoría y práctica (1875-1902)" (PDF). Revista de Estudios Políticos (in Spanish) (55). Madrid: Centre for Political and Constitutional Studies: 273–315. ISSN 0048-7694.
- Martorell Linares, Miguel Ángel (1997). "La crisis parlamentaria de 1913-1917. La quiebra del sistema de relaciones parlamentarias de la Restauración" (PDF). Revista de Estudios Políticos (in Spanish) (96). Madrid: Centre for Political and Constitutional Studies: 137–161. ISSN 0048-7694.

Preceded by Moret I	Government of Spain; 1906	Succeeded by Moret II
