= Second government of Antonio Maura =

2nd government of Antonio Maura
- Government of Spain
- 1907–1909
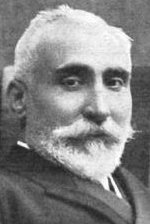
- Maura in 1910
- Date formed: 25 January 1907
- Date dissolved: 21 October 1909

People and organisations
- Monarch: Alfonso XIII
- Prime Minister: Antonio Maura
- No. of ministers: 8 (Note: Does not include the prime minister.)
- Total no. of members: 12
- Member party: Conservative
- Status in legislature: Minority (single-party) (Jan–May 1907); Majority (single-party) (May 1907–1909)
- Opposition party: Liberal; Liberal Democratic (Jan–Feb 1907)
- Opposition leader: Segismundo Moret; Eugenio Montero Ríos (Jan–Feb 1907)

History
- Predecessor: Vega de Armijo
- Successor: Moret III

The second government of Antonio Maura, was formed on 25 January 1907, following the latter's appointment as prime minister of Spain by King Alfonso XIII and his swearing-in that same day, as a result of the Marquis of Vega de Armijo's resignation from the post on 24 January. It succeeded the Vega de Armijo government and was the government of Spain from 25 January 1907 to 21 October 1909, a total of 1,000 days, or 2 years, 8 months and 26 days.

The cabinet comprised members of the Conservative Party and two military officers. It came to be known as the "Long Government" (gobierno largo), due the length of its tenure when compared to that of previous cabinets: thirteen governments had succeeded each other in the five years since the coming of age of Alfonso XIII on 17 May 1902. It resigned following the political crisis resulting from the Tragic Week and Francisco Ferrer's execution.

== Formation ==
=== Overview ===
The Spanish Constitution of 1876 enshrined Spain as a semi-constitutional monarchy during the Restoration period, awarding the monarch—under the royal prerogative—the power to appoint government members (including the prime minister); the ability to grant or deny the decree of dissolution of the Cortes, or the adjournment of legislative sessions, to the incumbent or aspiring government that requested it; and the capacity to inform, inspect and ultimately control executive acts by granting or denying the signature of royal decrees; among others.

The monarch would play a key role in the turno system by appointing and dismissing governments, which would then organize elections to provide themselves with a parliamentary majority. As a result, governments during this period were dependent on royal confidence, which was frequently secured or lost based on the leaders' ability to guarantee the internal unity and parliamentary cohesion of their parties. In practice, the royal prerogative was not exercised freely by the monarch, but was carried out through the opening of a round of consultations—with the presidents of the chambers, the leaders of the main parties, the potential candidates and other notable figures—prior to government formation, or when prime ministers raised a matter of confidence to the monarch.

=== Cabinet crisis ===
King Alfonso XIII held a round of consultations on 24–25 January 1907 to determine a solution to the political crisis arising from Vega de Armijo's resignation.

Consultations; King of Spain
Date	Consultee	Office/position	Party
24 January 1907	Eugenio Montero Ríos	President of the Senate; Prime Minister (former)	Lib–Dem^{/Dem}
24 January 1907	José Canalejas	President of the Congress of Deputies	Lib–Dem^{/Dem}
24 January 1907	Segismundo Moret	Prime Minister (former)	Lib–Dem^{/Lib}
24 January 1907	José López Domínguez	Prime Minister (former); President of the Senate (former)	Military
24 January 1907	Antonio Maura	Leader of the Conservative Party; Prime Minister (former)	Conservative
24 January 1907	Marcelo Azcárraga	Prime Minister (former); President of the Senate (former)	Military
24 January 1907	Alejandro Pidal y Mon	President of the Congress of Deputies (former)	Conservative
24 January 1907	2nd Marquis of Pidal	President of the Senate (former)	Conservative
24 January 1907	Count of Tejada de Valdeosera	President of the Senate (former)	Conservative
24 January 1907	Marquis of Vega de Armijo	Prime Minister; Leader of the Liberal Party	Lib–Dem^{/Dem}
25 January 1907	Antonio Maura	Leader of the Conservative Party; Prime Minister (former)	Conservative
Nominations
Outcome →	Nomination of the Marquis of Vega de Armijo (Liberal) No Declined; Nomination of Antonio Maura (Conservative) Accepted		

The outcome of the consultations led Alfonso XIII to entrust the formation of a new government to the Marquis of Vega de Armijo, who declined the nomination due to the internal divisions within the Liberal Party; then to Antonio Maura, who accepted the nomination.

== Council of Ministers ==
The Council of Ministers was structured into the office for the prime minister and eight ministries.

← Maura II Government → (25 January 1907 – 21 October 1909)
Portfolio	Name	Party	Took office	Left office	Ref.
Prime Minister	Antonio Maura	Conservative	25 January 1907	21 October 1909	
Minister of State	Manuel Allendesalazar	Conservative	25 January 1907	21 October 1909	
Minister of Grace and Justice	Juan Armada y Losada	Conservative	25 January 1907	21 October 1909	
Minister of War	Francisco Loño	Military	25 January 1907	30 June 1907†	
Minister of the Navy	José Ferrándiz y Niño	Military	25 January 1907	21 October 1909	
Minister of Finance	Guillermo de Osma y Scull	Conservative	25 January 1907	23 February 1908	
Minister of Governance	Juan de la Cierva	Conservative	25 January 1907	21 October 1909	
Minister of Public Instruction and Fine Arts	Faustino Rodríguez-San Pedro	Conservative	25 January 1907	21 October 1909	
Minister of Development	Augusto González Besada	Conservative	25 January 1907	14 September 1908	
=== Changes June 1907 ===
Portfolio	Name	Party	Took office	Left office	Ref.
Minister of War	Nicasio Montes Sierra took on the ordinary discharge of duties from 30 June to 3 July 1907.				
=== Changes July 1907 ===
Portfolio	Name	Party	Took office	Left office	Ref.
Minister of War	Fernando Primo de Rivera	Military	3 July 1907	1 March 1909	
=== Changes February 1908 ===
Portfolio	Name	Party	Took office	Left office	Ref.
Minister of Finance	Cayetano Sánchez Bustillo	Conservative	23 February 1908	14 September 1908	
=== Changes September 1908 ===
Portfolio	Name	Party	Took office	Left office	Ref.
Minister of Finance	Augusto González Besada	Conservative	14 September 1908	21 October 1909	
Minister of Development	José Sánchez-Guerra	Conservative	14 September 1908	21 October 1909	
=== Changes March 1909 ===
Portfolio	Name	Party	Took office	Left office	Ref.
Minister of War	Arsenio Linares Pombo	Military	1 March 1909	21 October 1909	

== Bibliography ==
- Constitución de la Monarquía Española (PDF) (Constitution). Madrid Gazette (in Spanish). King of Spain. 30 June 1876.
- Soldevilla, Fernando (1908). El Año Político 1907 (in Spanish). Madrid: National Library of Spain.
- Soldevilla, Fernando (1910). El Año Político 1909 (in Spanish). Madrid: National Library of Spain.
- Calero, Antonio María (1987). "La prerrogativa regia en la Restauración: teoría y práctica (1875-1902)" (PDF). Revista de Estudios Políticos (in Spanish) (55). Madrid: Centre for Political and Constitutional Studies: 273–315. ISSN 0048-7694.
- Martorell Linares, Miguel Ángel (1997). "La crisis parlamentaria de 1913-1917. La quiebra del sistema de relaciones parlamentarias de la Restauración" (PDF). Revista de Estudios Políticos (in Spanish) (96). Madrid: Centre for Political and Constitutional Studies: 137–161. ISSN 0048-7694.
- Martínez Ruiz, Enrique; Maqueda Abreu, Consuelo; De Diego, Emilio (1999). Atlas histórico de España. El Reinado de Alfonso XIII (1902-1931) (in Spanish). Vol. 2. Bilbao: Ediciones KAL. pp. 121–132. ISBN 9788470903502.
- González, María Jesús (2002). "'Neither God Nor Monster': Antonio Maura and the Failure of Conservative Reformism in Restoration Spain (1893–1923)" (PDF). European History Quarterly. 32 (3). SAGE Publications: 307–334. doi:10.1177/0269142002032003059. ISSN 0265-6914.

Preceded by Vega de Armijo	Government of Spain; 1907–1909	Succeeded by Moret III
