= 1910 Spanish general election =

- 8 May 1910 (Congress) (Note: Congress candidates elected automatically under Article 29 of the Electoral Law were proclaimed on 1 May 1910.); 22 May 1910 (Senate) (Note: The Senate election in the province of the Canary Islands was postponed to 27 May 1910.)

All 404 seats in the Congress of Deputies and 180 (of 360) seats in the Senate 203 seats needed for a majority in the Congress of Deputies
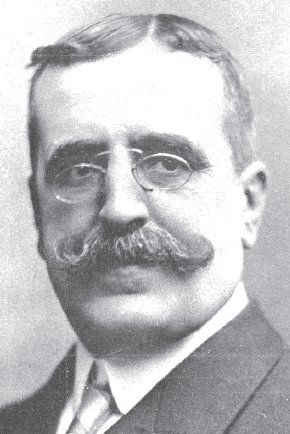

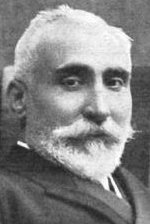

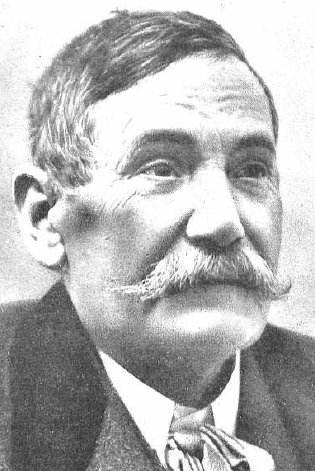

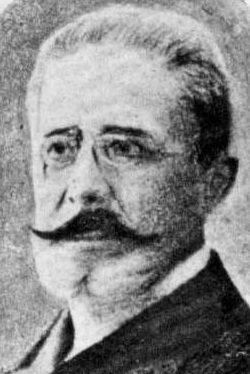

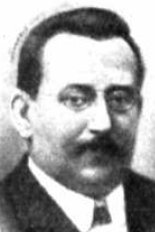

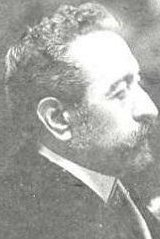
	First party	Second party	Third party
Leader	José Canalejas	Antonio Maura	Benito Pérez Galdós
Party	Democratic–Liberal	Conservative	Republican–Socialist
Leader since	9 February 1910 (Note: As prime minister. Canalejas would be elected leader of the Liberal Party on 20 July 1910.)	11 November 1903	1909
Leader's seat	Alcoy	Palma	Madrid
Last election	79 D · 31 S (Note: Results for PL (72 deputies and 25 senators) and PDM (7 deputies and 6 senators) in the 1907 election.)	256 D · 113 S	17 D · 2 S (Note: Results for UR, not including Catalonia (15 deputies and 1 senator), and RAS (2 deputies and 1 senator) in the 1907 election.)
Seats won	223 D · 104 S	110 D · 46 S	29 D · 3 S
Seat change	▲144 D · ▲73 S	▼146 D · ▼67 S	▲12 D · ▲1 S
	Fourth party	Fifth party	Sixth party
Leader	Bartolomé Feliú	Enric Prat de la Riba	José María Vallés
Party	Jaimist	Regionalist	UFNR
Leader since	1909	1902	1910
Leader's seat	Tafalla	Did not run	Barcelona (lost)
Last election	14 D · 6 S	13 D · 5 S	18 D · 5 S (Note: Results for PRF (9 deputies and 3 senators), UR in Catalonia (5 deputies and 2 senators) and CNR (4 deputies and 0 senators) in the 1907 election.)
Seats won	10 D · 3 S	8 D · 5 S	10 D · 1 S
Seat change	▼4 D · ▼3 S	▼5 D · 0 S	▼8 D · ▼4 S
Prime Minister before election
José Canalejas
Liberal
Prime Minister after election
José Canalejas
Liberal

A general election was held in Spain on 8 May 1910 (for the Congress of Deputies), and on 22 May 1910 (for the Senate), to elect the members of the 14th Cortes under the Spanish Constitution of 1876, during the Restoration period. All 404 seats in the Congress of Deputies were up for election, as well as 180 of 360 seats in the Senate.

The informal turno system had allowed the country's two main parties—the Conservatives and the Liberals—to alternate in power by determining in advance the outcome of elections through electoral fraud, often facilitated by the territorial clientelistic networks of local bosses (the caciques). The absence of politically authoritative figureheads since the deaths of Cánovas and Sagasta, together with the national trauma from the Spanish–American War, weakened the internal unity of both parties and allowed faction leaders and local caciques to strengthen their positions as power brokers.

Antonio Maura's return to power in 1907 was characterized by his attempt to implement regenerationism from inside the system (a "revolution from above") and a Spanish nationalist agenda. Legislatively prolific but politically controversial, Maura's tenure oversaw the Pact of Cartagena, the passage of a new electoral law, a naval shipbuilding programme, a promotion of national industry and an approach to the social question that included the approval of legal channels for labour dispute resolution, a legal framework for labour strikes and the creation of bodies responsible for social welfare. He also attempted—but failed—to reform local government through decentralization and corporatism, as well as passing a heavily repressive Law on Terrorism. The outbreak of war in Morocco, followed by Maura's decision to call up reservists and conscripts from Barcelona, unleashed a wave of anti-military unrest that reached its height during the Tragic Week. The government's repressive response (with Francisco Ferrer's execution sparking international outrage) ultimately led to Maura's downfall in October 1909 before completing his agenda.

In the government crisis that ensued, King Alfonso XIII appointed Liberal leader Segismundo Moret as new prime minister. However, concerns from various party sectors towards the latter's alliances with republicans (dubbed the "Left Bloc") ultimately led to his resignation after only four months—before an election could be organized—and in a new government under José Canalejas. While Canalejas managed to secure a parliamentary majority in ensuing election and re-assert his leadership over the Liberal Party, the crisis further eroded the Restoration regime. The end of the Left Bloc led the left-wing anti-monarchist parties joining into the Republican–Socialist Conjunction, which saw the Spanish Socialist Workers' Party (PSOE)—whose leader, Pablo Iglesias Posse, had abandoned the party's isolationist stance—secure parliamentary representation for the first time.

== Background ==
Following the Bourbon Restoration in 1874, the Spanish Constitution of 1876 enshrined Spain as a semi-constitutional monarchy, awarding the monarch—under the royal prerogative—the right of legislative initiative together with the bicameral Cortes; the capacity to veto laws passed by the legislative body; the power to appoint government members (including the prime minister); the ability to grant or deny parliamentary dissolution, the adjournment of legislative sessions and the signature of royal decrees; as well as the title of commander-in-chief of the armed forces. The monarch would play a key role in the turno system by appointing and dismissing governments, which would then organize elections to provide themselves with a parliamentary majority. This informal system allowed the two major "dynastic" political parties at the time, the Conservatives and the Liberals—characterized as oligarchic, elite parties with loose structures dominated by internal factions, each led by powerful individuals—to alternate in power by means of electoral fraud (pucherazo). This was achieved by assigning candidates to districts before the elections were held (encasillado), then arrange their victory through the links between the Ministry of Governance and the territorial clientelistic networks of provincial governors and local bosses (the caciques), excluding minor parties from the power sharing.

The Restoration system had entered a phase of decline following the national trauma from the Spanish–American War (the "1898 disaster") and the absence of politically authoritative figureheads since the deaths of Antonio Cánovas del Castillo (1897) and Práxedes Mateo Sagasta (1903), weakening the internal unity of both dynastic parties and strengthening the position of faction leaders and local caciques as power brokers. Concurrently, the anti-monarchist opposition became increasingly competitive in urban and some rural districts, partly due to the introduction of universal suffrage since 1890, partly due to the progressive weakening of the pro-government electoral apparatus.

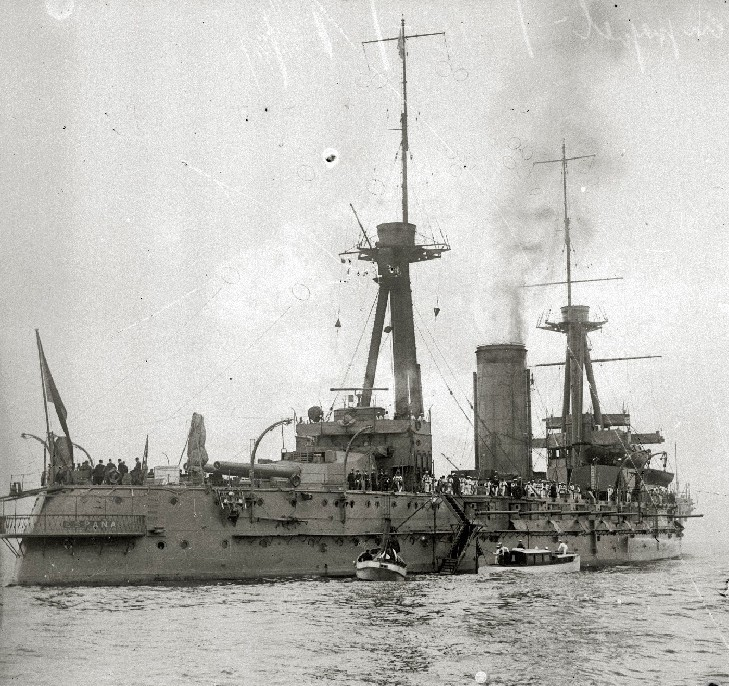
Spanish battleship España, the first ship of the España-class, entered on active service in 1913.

Antonio Maura, who had briefly served as prime minister between 1903 and 1904, was reappointed to the post in January 1907, forming what would become known as the "Long Government" (gobierno largo). Aiming to secure a solid parliamentary majority that enabled him to implement his agenda—a regenerationist approach from power (a "revolution from above") that would end political corruption and curb the power of local caciques to secure popular support for the monarchy—Maura used the system's own mechanisms to organize a rigged election and secure a disproportionate amount of seats at the expense of the Liberals, breaching a tacit pact between the elites of the two parties. He immediately passed a new electoral law introducing compulsory voting, independent scrutineers, additional election crimes, judicial arbitration by the Supreme Court in disputed cases and a transfer of the power to review electoral rolls from local councils to the Geographic and Statistic Institute, while allowing the automatic election of unopposed candidates.

Through the Pact of Cartagena, Maura's government strengthened ties with the United Kingdom and France following the Tangier Crisis, while also approving the 1908 Navy Law that would authorize the construction of the España-class battleships. The government promoted the protection and strengthening of national industry to increase employment and raise living standards, whereas Maura's approach to the social question aimed at defusing labour disputes through conciliation, arbitration or containing them within legal channels (such as a legal framework for labour strikes and the creation of the National Welfare Institute).

The government also suffered several major defeats, such as opposition to its proposed Law on Terrorism in 1908, whose heavily repressive nature prompted the birth of a Liberal–republican "Left Bloc", seeing monarchists and republicans allying for the first time against one of the dynastic parties with support from the "Trust" press (the media group comprising the three main liberal newspapers: El Liberal, El Imparcial and El Heraldo de Madrid). In the flagship proposal of his Spanish nationalist agenda, Maura attempted to reform the local administration by introducing municipal self-governance, decentralization and corporate suffrage, but the Liberal–republican opposition was able to obstruct the passage of this law. Seeking to strengthen cohesion among the various party factions that questioned his position, Liberal leader Segismundo Moret maintained this strategy during this period.

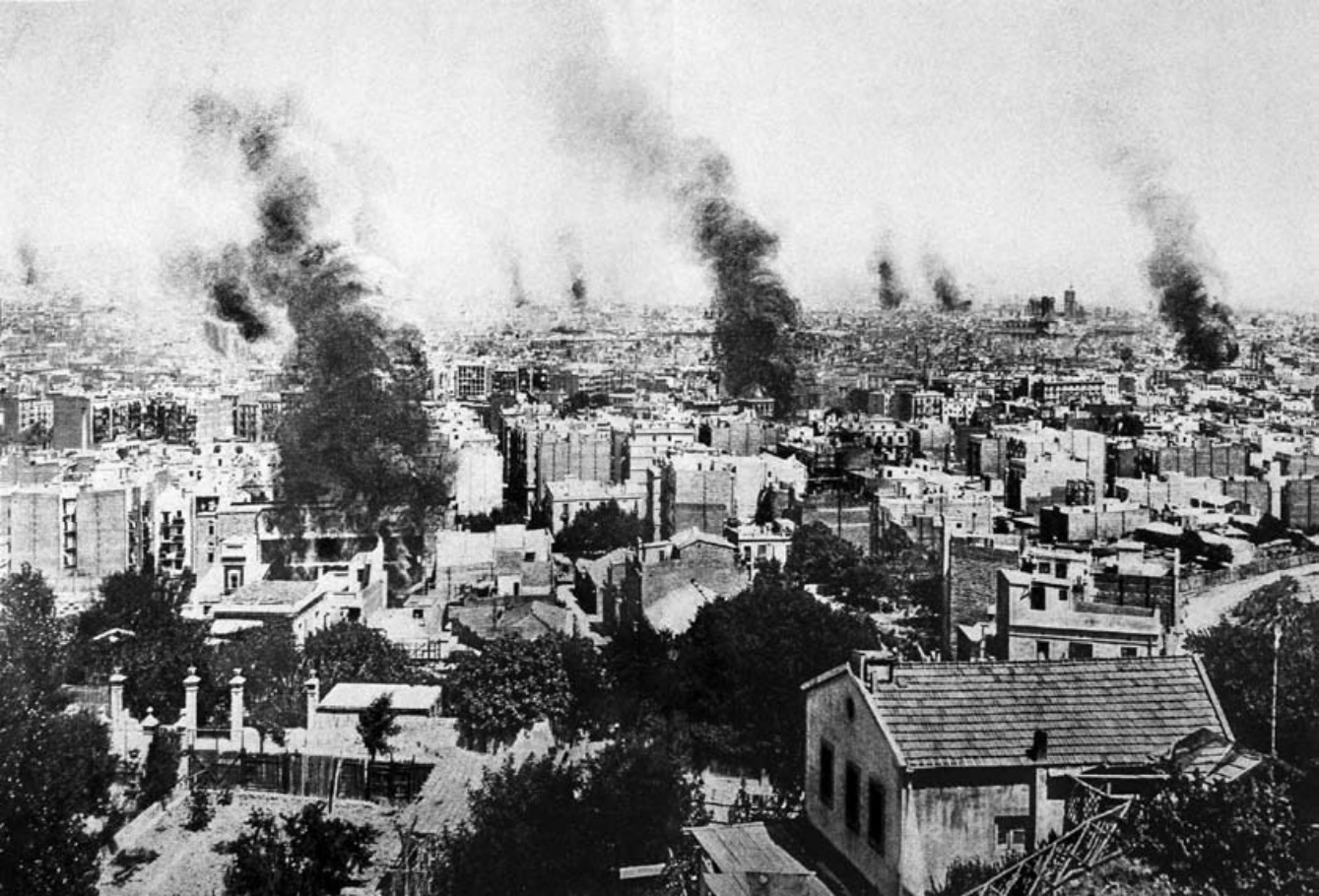
Barcelona during the Tragic Week.

In July 1909, the attack on Spanish railway workers by Riffian tribes led to the outbreak of the second Melillan campaign; the disaster of Wolf Ravine later that month, in which over 150 Spanish soldiers were killed, prompted the government to order the immediate mobilization of reservists from Barcelona. The recruitment proved unpopular, unleashing a wave of anti-war unrest among the working class—motivated by anger at wealthier families being able to "exempt" their offspring from military service by paying a fee (the redención en metálico or "cash redemption") or by hiring a replacement ("substitution"), in a system known as the quintas—that reached its peak during the events of the Tragic Week. The state's heavy-handed response (with over 100 killed and 1,700 arrested in the riots and a two-month suspension of constitutional rights across the country) and the execution of anarchist activist Francisco Ferrer on 13 October sparked widespread outrage: protests took place in major cities across Europe and Latin America under the chant "Maura, no!", with the scale of the international outcry being compared to that of the Dreyfus affair. The parliamentary counterattack from the Left Bloc proved effective: Maura resigned on 21 October and King Alfonso XIII appointed Moret as prime minister. This episode became the first occasion in the Restoration system that political pressure from the dynastic party in opposition was successful in bringing down the party in power, which would lead to Maura declaring the liquidation of the Pact of El Pardo and "implacable hostility" to the Liberals in power.

Once in power, the Liberal Party saw itself embroiled in an internal crisis, as Moret marginalized the Count of Romanones due to his involvement with the Spanish Rif Mining Company (CEMR), whereas his Left Bloc's dominance over more experienced Liberals was a cause of concern for others. With election preparations underway, mounting political pressure from Romanones and various party sectors—fearing that Moret would relegate them in the encasillado in favour of newcomers and republican allies—led the King to deny Moret a parliamentary dissolution, prompting the latter's resignation and the appointment of José Canalejas in his place on 9 February 1910. Moret's downfall marked both the first time that the monarchy prevented the first government in a new "turn" from calling an election, and that it bypassed the official leader of one of the dynastic leaders.

In the aftermath of the Tragic Week and with the Liberal takeover of power leading to the breakdown of the "Left Bloc", a number of anti-monarchist parties joined into the Republican–Socialist Conjunction ahead of incoming elections, including Pablo Iglesias Posse's Spanish Socialist Workers' Party (PSOE), Alejandro Lerroux's Radical Republican Party (PRR) and a faction within the Republican Union opposed to Nicolás Salmerón's decision to join Catalan Solidarity in 1906. The Catalan Solidarity alliance, having been internally weakened following the favourable stance of the Regionalist League towards Maura's proposed Local Administration Law and the PRR's successes in the 1908 Barcelona by-elections, disbanded entirely following the Tragic Week.

== Overview ==
Under the 1876 Constitution, the Spanish Cortes were conceived as "co-legislative bodies", forming a nearly perfect bicameral system. Both the Congress of Deputies and the Senate exercised legislative, oversight and budgetary functions, sharing almost equal powers, except in budget laws (taxation and public credit)—whose first reading corresponded to Congress—and in impeachment processes against government ministers, where Congress handled indictment and the Senate the trial.

=== Date ===
The term of each chamber of the Cortes—the Congress and one-half of the elective part of the Senate—expired five years from the date of their previous election, unless they were dissolved earlier. The previous elections were held on 21 April 1907 for the Congress and on 5 May 1907 for the Senate, which meant that the chambers' terms would have expired on 21 April and 5 May 1912, respectively.

The monarch had the prerogative to dissolve both chambers at any given time—either jointly or separately—and call a snap election. There was no constitutional requirement for concurrent elections to the Congress and the Senate, nor for the elective part of the Senate to be renewed in its entirety except in the case that a full dissolution was agreed by the monarch. Still, there was only one case of a separate election (for the Senate in 1877) and no half-Senate elections taking place under the 1876 Constitution.

The Cortes were officially dissolved on 14 April 1910, with the corresponding decree setting election day for 8 May (Congress) and 22 May 1910 (Senate) and scheduling for both chambers to reconvene on 15 June.

=== Electoral system ===
Voting for the Congress of Deputies was based on universal manhood suffrage, comprising all Spanish national males over 25 years of age with full civil rights, provided they had two years of residence in a Spanish municipality and were not enlisted ranks in active duty. Amendments in 1907 introduced compulsory voting, excepting those over 70, the clergy and—within their territories—trial judges and public notaries. Additional restrictions excluded those deprived of political rights or barred from public office by a final sentence, criminally imprisoned or convicted, legally incapacitated, bankrupt, public debtors, and homeless.

The Congress of Deputies had one seat per 50,000 inhabitants. Of these, those corresponding to larger urban areas were elected in multi-member constituencies using partial block voting: voters in constituencies electing ten seats or more could choose up to four candidates less than the number of seats at stake; in those with between eight and ten seats, up to three less; in those with between four and eight seats, up to two less; and in those with between one and four seats, up to one less. The remaining seats were elected in single-member districts by plurality voting and distributed among the provinces of Spain according to population. The 1907 electoral law abolished special districts and introduced automatic election for candidates in uncontested seats. (Note: Uncontested districts were those where the number of candidates was equal to or fewer than the available seats. Whenever vacancies remained, a by-election was held to fill the remaining seats.)

As a result of the aforementioned allocation, 306 single-member districts were established, and each Congress multi-member constituency (a total of 28, electing 98 seats) was entitled the following seats:

Seats	Constituencies
8	Madrid
7	Barcelona
5	Palma, Seville
4	Cartagena
3	Alicante, Almería, Badajoz, Burgos, Cádiz, Córdoba, Granada, Huelva, Jaén, Jerez de la Frontera, La Coruña, Las Palmas, Lugo, Málaga, Murcia, Oviedo, Pamplona, Santa Cruz de Tenerife, Santander, Tarragona, Valencia, Valladolid, Zaragoza

Voting for the elective part of the Senate was based on censitary suffrage, comprising Spanish male householders of voting age, residing in a Spanish municipality, with full political and civil rights, who met either of the following:

- Being qualified electors (such as archbishops, bishops and cathedral chapter members, in the archdioceses; full academics, in the royal academies; university authorities and professors, in the universities; or provincial deputies);
- Being elected as delegates (either by members with three years of seniority (in the economic societies of Friends of the Country; or by major taxpayers for direct taxes and local authorities, in the local councils).

180 Senate seats were elected using indirect, two-round majority voting. Delegates chosen by local councils—each of which was assigned an initial minimum of one delegate, with one additional delegate for every six councillors—voted for senators together with provincial deputies. The provinces of Barcelona, Madrid and Valencia were allocated four seats each, and the rest three each, for a total of 150. The remaining 30 seats were allocated to special institutional districts (one each), including major archdioceses, royal academies, universities, and economic societies, (Note: The following were considered as the major districts in each category: Archdioceses: Burgos, Granada, Santiago de Compostela, Seville, Tarragona, Toledo, Valencia, Valladolid, and Zaragoza.; Royal academies: Spanish; History; Fine Arts of San Fernando; Exact, Physical and Natural Sciences; Moral and Political Sciences; and Medicine.; Universities: Madrid, Barcelona, Granada, Oviedo, Salamanca, Santiago, Seville, Valencia, Valladolid, and Zaragoza.; Economic societies of Friends of the Country: Madrid, Barcelona, León, Seville, and Valencia.) each elected by their own qualified electors or delegates. Another 180 seats consisted of senators in their own right (such as the monarch's offspring and the heir apparent once coming of age (16), grandees of Spain with an income of Pts 60,000, certain general officers—captain generals and admirals—the Patriarch of the Indies and archbishops, and the heads of higher courts and state institutions (Note: These comprised the Council of State, the Supreme Court, the Court of Auditors and the Supreme Council of War and Navy.) after two years of service), as well as senators for life directly appointed by the monarch.

The law provided for by-elections to fill vacant seats during the legislative term.

== Candidates ==
=== Nomination rules ===
For the Congress, secular Spanish males of voting age, with full civil rights, could run for election. Causes of ineligibility applied to those excluded from voting or meeting any of the incompatibility rules for deputies, as well as to:

- Public contractors, within their relevant territories;
- Holders of a number of territorial posts (such as government-appointed positions, not including government ministers and Central Administration employees; local and provincial employees; and provincial deputation members), within their areas of jurisdiction, during their term of office and up to one year afterwards.
- Servants in the judiciary or the prosecution ministry.

Amendments in 1907 required candidates to either have previously served as deputies or be nominated by two current or former senators (or same-province deputies); three current or former provincial deputies (from the same province); or at least one twentieth of the electorate in the constituencies for which they sought election, disallowing electors from nominating more than one candidate (except in multi-member constituencies, which used the same partial block voting system for nominations as for elections).

For the Senate, eligibility was limited to Spanish males over 35 years of age not under criminal prosecution, disfranchisement nor asset seizure, and who either qualified as senators in their own right or belonged (or had belonged) to certain categories:

- Provided an income of Pts 7,500: the presidents of the Senate and the Congress; deputies serving in three different congresses or eight terms; government ministers; bishops; grandees of Spain not eligible as senators in their own right; and various senior officials after two years of service (such as certain general officers—lieutenant generals and vice admirals—and members of higher courts and state institutions); heads of diplomatic missions abroad (ambassadors after two years, and plenipotentiaries after four); heads and full academics in the royal academies; chief engineers; and full professors with four years of service;
- Provided an income of Pts 20,000 or being taxpayers with a minimum quota of Pts 4,000 in direct taxes (paid two years in advance): Spanish nobility; and former deputies, provincial deputies or mayors in provincial capitals or towns over 20,000;
- Having served as senators before the promulgation of the 1876 Constitution.

Other ineligibility provisions for the Senate also applied to a number of territorial officials within their areas of jurisdiction, during their term of office and up to three months afterwards; public contractors; tax collectors; and public debtors.

Incompatibility rules barred combining:

- The role of senator with other legislative roles (deputy, senator and local councillor, except those in Madrid; and provincial deputies within their respective provinces); or with any public post not explicitly permitted under Senate eligibility requirements;
- The role of deputy with any other civil, military or judicial post, with exceptions—and as many as 40 deputies allowed to simultaneously benefit from these—including a number of specific posts based in Madrid, such as any of the aforementioned ones (provided a public salary of Pts 12,500); senior court officials; university authorities and professors; chief engineers; and general officers.

== Results ==
=== Congress of Deputies ===
← Summary of the 8 May 1910 Congress of Deputies election results →
Parties and alliances	Popular vote		Seats		
Parties and alliances	Votes	%	A.29	Cont.	Total
Democratic–Liberal Party (D–L)			70	153	223
Conservative Party (PC)			38	72	110
Republican–Socialist Conjunction (CRS)			3	26	29
Republican Nationalist Federal Union (UFNR)			0	10	10
Traditionalist Communion (Jaimist) (CT)			3	7	10
Regionalist League (LR)			2	6	8
Integrist Party (PI)			1	2	3
Autonomist Republican Union Party (PURA)			0	2	2
Independents (INDEP)			2	7	9
Total			119	285	404
Votes cast / turnout					
Abstentions					
Registered voters					

Seats
D–L	55.20%
PC	27.23%
CRS	7.18%
UFNR	2.48%
CT	2.48%
LR	1.98%
PI	0.74%
PURA	0.50%
INDEP	2.23%

=== Senate ===
← Summary of the 22 May 1910 Senate of Spain election results →
Parties and alliances	Seats
Democratic–Liberal Party (D–L)	104
Conservative Party (PC)	46
Integrist Party (PI)	5
Regionalist League (LR)	5
Republican–Socialist Conjunction (CRS)	3
Traditionalist Communion (Jaimist) (CT)	3
Republican Nationalist Federal Union (UFNR)	1
Social Defence Committee (CDS)	1
Independents (INDEP)	3
Archbishops (ARCH)	9
Total elective seats	180

Seats
D–L	57.78%
PC	25.56%
PI	2.78%
LR	2.78%
CRS	1.67%
CT	1.67%
UFNR	0.56%
CDS	0.56%
INDEP	1.67%
ARCH	5.00%

=== Maps ===
Election results by constituency (Congress).

Election results by constituency (Senate).

=== Distribution by group ===
Summary of political group distribution in the 14th Restoration Cortes (1910–1914)
Group	Parties and alliances	C	S	Total
D–L	Monarchist Democratic Party (PDM)	152	16	327
D–L	Liberal Party (PL)	68	86	327
D–L	Basque Dynastics (Urquijist) (DV)	1	2	327
D–L	Monarchist Coalition (MON)	2	0	327
PC	Conservative Party (PC)	109	45	156
PC	Anti-Liberal Catholic Alliance (ACA)	1	1	156
CRS	Republican Union (UR)	13	2	32
CRS	Radical Republican Party (PRR)	11	0	32
CRS	Federal Republican Party (PRF)	3	1	32
CRS	Spanish Socialist Workers' Party (PSOE)	1	0	32
CRS	Independents (INDEP)	1	0	32
CT	Traditionalist Communion (Jaimist) (CT)	5	3	13
CT	Anti-Liberal Catholic Alliance (ACA)	5	0	13
LR	Regionalist League (LR)	8	5	13
UFNR	Republican Nationalist Federal Union (UFNR)	10	1	11
PI	Integrist Party (PI)	2	3	8
PI	Anti-Liberal Catholic Alliance (ACA)	1	2	8
PURA	Autonomist Republican Union Party (PURA)	2	0	2
CDS	Social Defence Committee (CDS)	0	1	1
INDEP	Independents (INDEP)	7	3	12
INDEP	Independent Catholics (CAT)	2	0	12
ARCH	Archbishops (ARCH)	0	9	9
Total		404	180	584

== See also ==
- Encasillado

== Bibliography ==
Legislation

- Ley mandando que los distritos para las elecciones de Diputados a Cortes sean los que se expresan en la división adjunta (PDF) (Law). Madrid Gazette (in Spanish). 1 January 1871.
- Constitución de la Monarquía Española (PDF) (Constitution). Madrid Gazette (in Spanish). 30 June 1876.
- Ley electoral de Senadores (PDF) (Law). Madrid Gazette (in Spanish). 8 February 1877.
- Ley electoral de los Diputados a Cortes (PDF) (Law). Madrid Gazette (in Spanish). 28 December 1878.
- Ley enumerando los empleos con los cuales es compatible el cargo de Diputado a Cortes (PDF) (Law). Madrid Gazette (in Spanish). 7 March 1880.
- Ley dividiendo la provincia de Guipúzcoa en distritos para la elección de Diputados a Cortes (PDF) (Law). Madrid Gazette (in Spanish). 23 June 1885.
- Ley dividiendo el distrito electoral de Tarrasa en dos, que se denominarán de Tarrasa y de Sabadell (PDF) (Law). Madrid Gazette (in Spanish). 18 January 1887.
- Ley reformando el art. 4º. de la ley de Incompatibilidades (PDF) (Law). Madrid Gazette (in Spanish). 31 July 1887.
- Ley fijando la división de la provincia de Álava en distritos electorales para Diputados a Cortes (PDF) (Law). Madrid Gazette (in Spanish). 10 July 1888.
- Ley electoral para Diputados a Cortes (PDF) (Law). Madrid Gazette (in Spanish). 26 June 1890.
- Ley disponiendo que las primeras y sucesivas elecciones que se verifiquen en la provincia de Zamora se dividirá en siete distritos en la forma que se expresa (PDF) (Law). Madrid Gazette (in Spanish). 18 June 1895.
- Leyes aprobando la división electoral de las provincias de León y Vizcaya (PDF) (Law). Madrid Gazette (in Spanish). 2 August 1895.
- Leyes aprobando la división electoral en las provincias de Sevilla y de Barcelona (PDF) (Law). Madrid Gazette (in Spanish). 5 July 1898.
- Real decreto disponiendo el número de Senadores que han de elegir las provincias que se citan (PDF) (Royal Decree). Madrid Gazette (in Spanish). 16 March 1899.
- Ley mandando que en lo sucesivo sean cuatro los Diputados a Cortes que elegirá la circunscripción electoral de Cartagena (PDF) (Law). Madrid Gazette (in Spanish). 7 August 1899.
- Ley estableciendo una circunscripción para elegir tres Diputados a Cortes, que la constituirán los cuatro partidos judiciales de Ayamonte, Hueva, Moguer y la Palma, con todas las poblaciones que de ellos forman parte (PDF) (Law). Madrid Gazette (in Spanish). 24 March 1902.
- Ley sancionada por S. M. formando un solo distrito electoral para Diputados a Cortes con los de Las Palmas y Guía (PDF) (Law). Madrid Gazette (in Spanish). 5 April 1904.
- Ley reformando la Electoral vigente (PDF) (Law). Madrid Gazette (in Spanish). 8 August 1907.
- Real decreto declarando disueltos el Congreso de los Diputados y la parte electiva del Senado, y disponiendo que las Cortes se reúnan en Madrid el 15 de Junio próximo, y que las elecciones de Diputados y Senadores se verifiquen el 8 y 22 de Mayo próximo, respectivamente (PDF) (Royal Decree). Madrid Gazette (in Spanish). 14 April 1910.

Other

- Soldevilla, Fernando (1910). El Año Político 1909 (in Spanish). Madrid: National Library of Spain.
- Soldevilla, Fernando (1911). El Año Político 1910 (in Spanish). Madrid: National Library of Spain.
- Fernández Almagro, Melchor (1943). "Las Cortes del siglo XIX y la práctica electoral" (PDF). Revista de Estudios Políticos (in Spanish) (9–10). Madrid: Centre for Political and Constitutional Studies: 383–419. ISSN 0048-7694.
- Robles Egea, Antonio (1982). "Formación de la Conjunción Republicano-Socialista de 1909" (PDF). Revista de Estudios Políticos (in Spanish) (29). Madrid: Centre for Political and Constitutional Studies: 145–161.
- Dendle, Brian John (1986). "Galdós in context: The Republican Years, 1907-1914". Anales Galdosianos (21). Alicante: Miguel de Cervantes Virtual Library: 33–44. ISSN 0569-9924.
- Calero, Antonio María (1987). "La prerrogativa regia en la Restauración: teoría y práctica (1875-1902)" (PDF). Revista de Estudios Políticos (in Spanish) (55). Madrid: Centre for Political and Constitutional Studies: 273–315. ISSN 0048-7694.
- Ortega Álvarez, Luis; Santaolaya Machetti, Pablo (1996). "Evolución histórica del sistema electoral español". Revista de las Cortes Generales (in Spanish). 37. Cortes Generales: 65–107. doi:10.33426/rcg/1996/37/784. ISSN 0213-0130.
- Martorell Linares, Miguel Ángel (1997). "La crisis parlamentaria de 1913-1917. La quiebra del sistema de relaciones parlamentarias de la Restauración" (PDF). Revista de Estudios Políticos (in Spanish) (96). Madrid: Centre for Political and Constitutional Studies: 137–161. ISSN 0048-7694.
- López, Germán (1998). "Un estudio sobre la reforma electoral conservadora de 1907 y sus posibilidades democratrizadoras" (PDF). Saitabi (in Spanish) (48). Valencia: University of Valencia: 185–209. Archived from the original (PDF) on 2014-05-13.
- Martínez Ruiz, Enrique; Maqueda Abreu, Consuelo; De Diego, Emilio (1999). Atlas histórico de España. El Reinado de Alfonso XIII (1902-1931) (in Spanish). Vol. 2. Bilbao: Ediciones KAL. pp. 121–132. ISBN 9788470903502.
- Juliá, Santos (1999). Un siglo de España. Política y sociedad (in Spanish). Madrid: Marcial Pons. pp. 13–76. ISBN 9788495379030.
- Armengol i Segú, Josep; Varela Ortega, José (2001). El poder de la influencia: geografía del caciquismo en España (1875-1923) (in Spanish). Madrid: Marcial Pons. pp. 655–776. ISBN 9788425911521.
- García Muñoz, Montserrat (2002). "La documentación electoral y el fichero histórico de diputados". Revista General de Información y Documentación (in Spanish). 12 (1): 93–137. ISSN 1132-1873.
- González, María Jesús (2002). "'Neither God Nor Monster': Antonio Maura and the Failure of Conservative Reformism in Restoration Spain (1893–1923)" (PDF). European History Quarterly. 32 (3). SAGE Publications: 307–334. doi:10.1177/0269142002032003059. ISSN 0265-6914.
- Carreras de Odriozola, Albert; Tafunell Sambola, Xavier (2005) [1989]. Estadísticas históricas de España, siglos XIX-XX (PDF) (in Spanish). Vol. 1 (II ed.). Bilbao: Fundación BBVA. pp. 1072–1097. ISBN 84-96515-00-1. Archived from the original (PDF) on 24 September 2015.
- Robles Muñoz, Cristóbal (2009). "¿Acabó la Semana Trágica con Maura? Algunas claves políticas (1906-1909)" (PDF). Analecta Sacra Tarraconensia (in Spanish) (82): 75–114. ISSN 0304-4300.
- Martínez Relanzón, Alejandro (2017). "Political Modernization in Spain Between 1876 and 1923". Annales Universitatis Mariae Curie-Skłodowska, Sectio K. 24 (1). Madrid: Maria Curie-Skłodowska University: 145–154. doi:10.17951/k.2017.24.1.145. S2CID 159328027.
- Serrano Lahoz, Manuel (2020). Los partidos republicanos durante la Restauración (1874-1931) (PDF) (BA thesis) (in Spanish). University of Zaragoza.
- Royal Academy of History (2022). "Historia Hispánica". Historia Hispánica (in Spanish).
- Ruiz Franco, Rosario (2024). "Historia Contemporánea de España. Reinado de Alfonso XIII (1902-1923). El "gobierno largo de Maura" y la Semana Trágica" (PDF) (in Spanish). Charles III University of Madrid.
