= José Canalejas y Casas =

Spanish engineer, writer and politician

José Canalejas
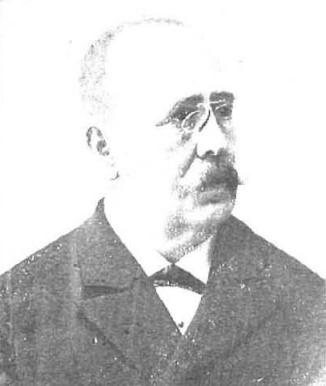

Deputy at Cortes
- Constituency: Arévalo & Borjas

Senator of the Kingdom
- Constituency: the province of Ávila

Personal details
- Born: December 1827 Barcelona, Spain
- Died: November 1902 (aged 74) Madrid, Spain

José Canalejas y Casas (1827–1902) was a Spanish engineer, writer and politician.

== Biography ==
Born in December (Note: Depending on the source: 4 or 27 December.) 1827 in Barcelona. He was son of José María Canalejas Ugalde and Ana María Casas Foxet.

He took studies in industrial engineering in Liège. Canalejas, who worked for the Railway Company from Ciudad Real to Badajoz, came to replace Telesforo Gómez Rodríguez as member of the Congress of Deputies, elected in representation of the Arévalo district at 1876 election to Cortes, who had renounced to the seat, as it was incompatible with his occupation as land registrar.

He became deputy again in 1881, this time in representation of Borjas, replacing Manuel Vivanco Menchaca, elected at the 1879 election, who had renounced to office in January 1881. Canalejas became Senator in representation of the province of Ávila in 1891.

He died in Madrid in November 1902. (Note: Depending on the source: 21 or 22 November.)

José Canalejas Casas was father José Canalejas Méndez, prime minister of Spain during the reign of Alfonso XIII and of Luis Canalejas Méndez, politician and engineer.

== Works ==
- Anuario de los progresos de la industria y la agricultura (1861)
