= Manuel Pardiñas =

Aragonese anarchist assassin (1880–1912)

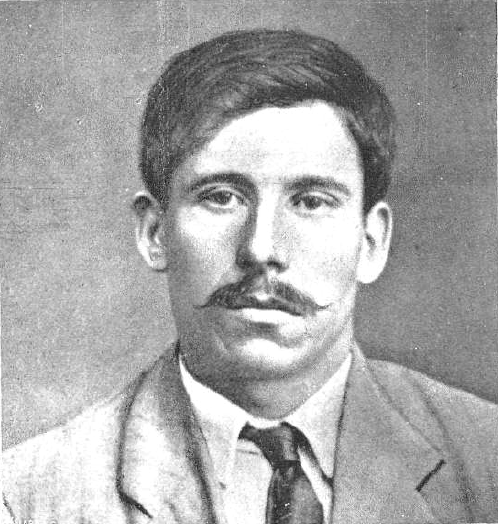
- Photograph of Pardiñas, published in Mundo Gráfico in 1912
- Born: Manuel Pardiñas Serrato; 1880; El Grado, Uesca, Aragon, Spain
- Died: 12 November 1912 (aged 31–32); Madrid, Spain
- Cause of death: Suicide by gunshot
- Known for: Assassination of José Canalejas
- Movement: Anarchism in Spain

Manuel Pardiñas Serrato (1880 – 12 November 1912) was an Aragonese anarchist assassin, responsible for the assassination of José Canalejas, the Prime Minister of Spain.

== Biography ==
Manuel Pardiñas Serrato was born in the Aragonese town of El Grado in 1880. He moved to Zaragoza for work, before emigrating to France in 1901. Due to his anarchist activities, he was soon wanted by the French police and forced to flee to the Americas. He attempted to find work at the Panama Canal, but soon emigrated to Cuba. With a number of Cuban anarchists, he moved to Tampa, Florida, where he joined an anarchist group led by Pedro Esteve. He later went to London, where he made contact with an international anarchist committee. He then went to Bordeaux, where he reunited with a number of other emigrants from Tampa.

At this time, several European leaders, including Spanish king Alfonso XIII, had been targeted for assassination by anarchists. Following the suppression of the Tragic Week uprising, in 1910, a new liberal government was formed under José Canalejas as prime minister. On 23 September 1912, when a railway workers' strike broke out in Catalonia, Pardiñas reportedly discussed the rail stoppage with representatives of financial institutions, including the Bank of Liverpool. By the following week, the strike had escalated and spread nationwide, with 65,500 workers declaring themselves in favour of a general strike. On 3 October, the Canalejas responded by suspending the right to strike and mobilising military reservists to take over the railways.

At a meeting in Marseille, Pardiñas' anarchist group decided to assassinate Canalejas for his role in suppressing the strike, as well as other policies which they saw as authoritarian and colonialist. On 10 November 1912, Pardiñas returned to Spain and went to Madrid to carry out the deed. On 12 November, while Canalejas was making his way home, he stopped outside the San Martín Bookshop in Puerta del Sol. There Pardiñas shot the prime minister with a Holland & Holland pistol, before turning the gun on himself and immediately committing suicide.

== Bibliography ==
- Díez Torre, Alejandro R. (2022). "Manuel Pardiñas Serrato". Historia Hispánica (in Spanish). Royal Academy of History.
