= Demetrio Alonso Castrillo =

Spanish politician and lawyer

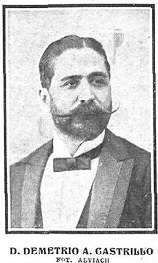
Demetrio Alonso Castrillo

Demetrio Alonso Castrillo (22 December 1841 – 30 November 1916) was a Spanish politician and lawyer.

Born in Valderas, he was Minister of the Interior during the reign of Alfonso XIII

A member of the Liberal Party, he was elected successively between 1881 and 1905 and became the Congress deputy for León (province).

He served as Minister of the Interior from 2 January to 3 April 1911 in the cabinet of José Canalejas.
