= Trinitario Ruiz Valarino =

Spanish politician (1862-1945)

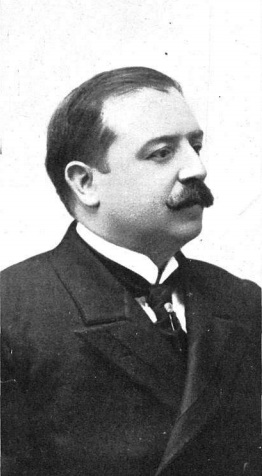

Minister of Grace and Justice of Spain
- In office 19 April 1917 – 11 June 1917
- Prime Minister: Marquis of Alhucemas
- Preceded by: Juan Alvarado y del Saz
- Succeeded by: Manuel de Burgos y Mazo
- In office 9 February 1910 – 3 April 1911
- Prime Minister: José Canalejas
- Preceded by: Eduardo Martínez del Campo
- Succeeded by: Antonio Barroso y Castillo

Minister of Governance of Spain
- In office 3 April 1911 – 29 June 1911
- Prime Minister: José Canalejas
- Preceded by: Demetrio Alonso Castrillo
- Succeeded by: Antonio Barroso y Castillo

Personal details
- Born: Trinitario Ruiz Valarino; 21 October 1862 Valencia, Spain
- Died: 12 December 1945 (aged 83) Madrid, Spain
- Party: Liberal
- Other party: Liberal Democratic (1913–1923); Democratic (1903–1910)

Antonio Barroso y Castillo (21 October 1862 – 12 December 1945) was a Spanish politician who served as minister during the Spanish Restoration.
