= Antonio Barroso y Castillo =

Spanish politician (1854–1916)

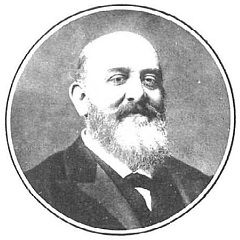

Minister of Grace and Justice of Spain
- In office 9 December 1915 – 7 October 1916
- Prime Minister: Count of Romanones
- Preceded by: Manuel de Burgos y Mazo
- Succeeded by: Juan Alvarado y del Saz
- In office 31 December 1912 – 24 May 1913
- Prime Minister: Count of Romanones
- Preceded by: Diego Arias de Miranda
- Succeeded by: Pedro Rodríguez de la Borbolla
- In office 3 April 1911 – 29 June 1911
- Prime Minister: José Canalejas
- Preceded by: Trinitario Ruiz Valarino
- Succeeded by: José Canalejas
- In office 30 November 1906 – 25 January 1907
- Prime Minister: Segismundo Moret; Marquis of Vega de Armijo
- Preceded by: Count of Romanones
- Succeeded by: Juan Armada y Losada

Minister of Governance of Spain
- In office 29 June 1911 – 31 December 1912
- Prime Minister: José Canalejas; Count of Romanones
- Preceded by: Manuel de Burgos y Mazo
- Succeeded by: Juan Alvarado y del Saz

Minister of Public Instruction and Fine Arts of Spain
- In office 21 October 1909 – 9 February 1910
- Prime Minister: Segismundo Moret
- Preceded by: Faustino Rodríguez-San Pedro
- Succeeded by: Count of Romanones

Personal details
- Born: Antonio Barroso y Castillo; 25 October 1854 Córdoba, Spain
- Died: 7 October 1916 (aged 61) San Sebastián, Spain
- Party: Liberal
- Other political affiliations: Liberal Democratic (1913–1916); Democratic (1903–1907)

Antonio Barroso y Castillo (25 October 1854 – 7 October 1916) was a Spanish politician who served as minister during the Spanish Restoration.
