= Diego Arias de Miranda =

Spanish politician (1845–1929)

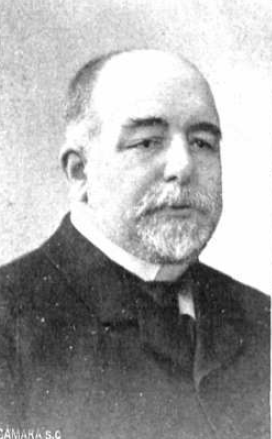
Diego Arias de Miranda

Diego Arias de Miranda (December 1, 1845, Aranda de Duero – June 28, 1929) was a Spanish politician linked to Christian naturalism. He was minister of justice and navy during the reign of King Alfonso XIII.

A member of the Liberal Party, his political career began with the 1872 election, which resulted in his election in the district of Burgos, even though the proclamation of the First Spanish Republic resulted in a parenthesis in his political activity, and he did not return as a representative until 1886. Since then, he got reelected in every political process until 1903, and in 1904 he passed to the Senate as senator for life.

He was minister of the Navy from February 9, 1910 to April 3, 1911 in the Canalejas cabinet, and minister of Justice from March 12 and December 31, 1912, in successive governments, presided by Canalejas until his assassination, then García Prieto, and finally the Count of Romanones.

He was a civilian governor, general manager of public works and mayor of Aranda de Duero. In the center of Aranda de Duero, he commissioned a square named in his honor, treating himself with a plaza in whose center he commissioned a statue of himself. His daughter, Josefina Arias de Miranda, married José Martínez de Velasco (1875–1936), founder and leader of the Spanish Agrarian Party, minister of several departments during the Second Republic and mayor of Madrid for 12 years. The son-in-law of Don Diego Arias de Miranda was executed at the beginning of the Spanish Civil War.
