= European History Quarterly =

- Discipline: History
- Language: English
- Edited by: Silvia Evangelisti, Ilaria Favretto, Peter Anderson, Amanda Dillon

Publication details
- Former name: European Studies Review
- History: 1971–present
- Publisher: SAGE Publications
- Frequency: Quarterly
- Impact factor: 0.415 (2018)

Standard abbreviations
- ISO 4: Eur. Hist. Q.

Indexing
- European Studies Review
- CODEN: EHIQEH
- ISSN: 0265-6914 (print); 1461-7110 (web)
- LCCN: 84643695
- OCLC no.: 123479187
- European Studies Review
- ISSN: 0014-3111

Links
- Journal homepage; Online access; Online archive

European History Quarterly is a quarterly peer-reviewed academic journal that publishes articles in the field of history. The journal was established in 1971 as the European Studies Review and obtained its current title in 1984. It covers a range of subjects from the later Middle Ages to post-1945.

== Abstracting and indexing ==
European History Quarterly is abstracted and indexed in Social Sciences Citation Index. According to the Journal Citation Reports, the journal has a 2018 impact factor of 0.415, ranking 160th out of 176 in Political Science and 59th out of 95 in History.
