= Juan Alvarado y del Saz =

Spanish lawyer and politician

Juan Alvarado

Juan Alvarado y del Saz (1856 in Agüimes – 1935) was a Spanish lawyer and politician.

He was Minister of Naval Defense of Spain and Minister of Economy and Property of Spain, Minister of Justice of Spain and Minister of External Affairs during the reign of Alfonso XIII.

Starting as a lawyer, he began his political life in the Partido Posibilista and in 1893 the Partido Liberal as one of its military representatives.

He was elected deputy to Congress for the Province of Huesca in the successive elections celebrated between 1886 and 1923, was Minister of Navy between 6 July and 30 November 1906 in a government presided over by José López Domínguez. Between 21 October 1909 and 9 February 1910 he would occupy the Ministry of the Treasury in a cabinet presided over by Segismundo Moret.

Later he served as Minister of Justice from 11 October 1916 to 19 April 1917, and Minister of State until the 11 June 1917 under the presidency of Manuel García Prieto.

He died in 1935.
