= Juan Navarro-Reverter =

Spanish historian and politician

The Most Excellent Juan Navarro Reverter
- Born: Juan Navarro Reverter; 27 January 1844; Valencia, Spain
- Died: 2 April 1924 (aged 80); Madrid, Spain

Seat P of the Real Academia Española
- In office 6 December 1914 – 2 April 1924
- Preceded by: Miguel Mir
- Succeeded by: José Martínez Ruiz

Juan Navarro Reverter (27 January 1844, in Valencia, Spain – 2 April 1924, in Madrid, Spain) was a Spanish historian and politician who served as Minister of State between 1912 and 1913.
