= Matter of confidence =

A Matter of Confidence or Issue of Confidence in the Parliament of the United Kingdom is a matter that is so important that the government of the day must demonstrate that it has the "confidence" of the House of Commons, namely that a majority of the House of Commons votes to support the government of day. If the government of the day is defeated on a confidence matter, by constitutional convention it will need to resign or call a general election.

The concept of a matter of confidence is broader than a formal motion of no confidence, which is a specific example of a matter of confidence. If the government is defeated on a motion of no confidence, that is a clear expression by the House of Commons that it does not support the government. However, other matters can also be matters of confidence. For example, the Speech from the Throne is an outline of the government's political agenda for the upcoming session. If the government is defeated on the address to accept the speech, that is generally considered a matter of confidence. A defeat on the yearly budget is also normally considered a confidence matter. Important government bills may also be considered a confidence matter. If the government is defeated on any of these, the Official Opposition may make a formal motion of no confidence, or the government may simply accept that it has lost the confidence of the Commons. The government can then advise the monarch to dissolve Parliament and call a general election.

The concept of confidence matters is also used in other parliaments which follow the Westminster system of government, such as the Parliament of Canada and the Parliament of Australia.
