= Government formation =

Selecting a prime minister and cabinet

Government formation is the process in a parliamentary or semi-presidential system of selecting a prime minister and cabinet members. If no party controls a majority of seats, it can also involve deciding which parties will be part of a coalition government. It usually occurs after an election, but can also occur after a vote of no confidence in an existing government. This is in contrast to countries where the legislative and executive branches have distinct mandates, such as many presidential systems, where the selection of cabinet ministers is distinct from that of legislative leadership.

== Delays or failures in forming a government ==
A failure to form a government is a type of cabinet crisis where a functional cabinet (whether a majority or a minority government ruling with a confidence and supply agreement) cannot be formed. Such a problem typically occurs after an inconclusive election, but can also happen if a formerly-stable government falls apart mid-term and new elections are not called.

The process of government formation can sometimes be lengthy. For example, following the 2013 German federal election, Germany engaged in 85 days of government formation negotiations, the longest in the nation's post-war history. The outcome was the third Merkel cabinet, another grand coalition led by Angela Merkel.

During the formation process, the outgoing ministers typically remains in office as a caretaker government. If the cabinet formation process is lengthy, this can result in a substantial extension of their term; for example, Israeli Prime Minister Ehud Olmert resigned from office in September 2008, but remained in office until March 2009, since his successor as Kadima party leader, Tzipi Livni, could not form a new government without recourse to snap elections held in February 2009 (in which Kadima lost the premiership to the Likud's Benjamin Netanyahu, who ended up being Olmert's successor).

=== Belgium ===
Belgian governments are typically coalition governments due to the split between the Flemish and French-speaking parts of the country. On occasion, this has led to a situation where no party is able to form a government but the Parliament does not vote to return to the polls. This occurred most notably in 2010–11, when Belgium was ruled by a caretaker government for a year and a half. Though there were calls for drastic measures to resolve the issue, including via a partition of Belgium, government functions continued without interruption under the caretaker government.

=== Iraq's Kurdistan Region ===
Following elections in Iraq's Kurdistan Region, it often takes several months for the Kurdistan Democratic Party and the Patriotic Union of Kurdistan to agree to form a new Kurdistan Regional Government cabinet. Following elections for the Kurdistan Parliament in September 2018, the new government was not fully formed until July 2019.

The process is taking even longer after the 2024 election cycle, with the process lasting more than two years after the 2024 Kurdistan Region parliamentary election on October 20, 2024.

== See also ==
- Formateur
- Dutch cabinet formation
- German governing coalition
