= Revista de Estudios Políticos =

Spanish political science journal

- Discipline: Political science
- Language: Spanish
- Edited by: Juan José Solozabal Echavarria

Publication details
- History: 1941–present
- Publisher: Centre for Political and Constitutional Studies (Spain)
- Frequency: Continuous
- Open access: Yes
- License: CC BY-NC-ND 4.0
- Impact factor: 0.377 (2021)

Standard abbreviations
- ISO 4: Rev. Estud. Políticos

Indexing
- ISSN: 0048-7694 (print); 1989-0613 (web)
- LCCN: 44029627
- OCLC no.: 1589742

Links
- Journal homepage; Online archive

Revista de Estudios Políticos (English: Journal of Political Studies) is a peer-reviewed open-access academic journal covering political science, political history, and history of political thought and published by the Centre for Political and Constitutional Studies (Madrid, Spain). The journal was established in 1941.

== History and profile ==
The journal was established by the Institute of Political Studies, a Francoist group, in 1941. It is headquartered in Madrid. In its early period the journal also covered articles about international politics in addition to those on political science, political history, and history of political thought. Its international politics section frequently featured articles related to major developments in the Soviet Union and other communist states.

The journal was published on a quarterly basis until 2021 when it became a print on demand publication. The editor-in-chief is Juan José Solozabal Echavarria (Autonomous University of Madrid).

== Abstracting and indexing ==
The journal is abstracted and indexed in:

- EBSCO databases
- Modern Language Association Database
- ProQuest databases
- Scopus
- Social Sciences Citation Index

According to the Journal Citation Reports, the journal has a 2021 impact factor of 0.377.
