= Real decreto =

Legal order of Spain

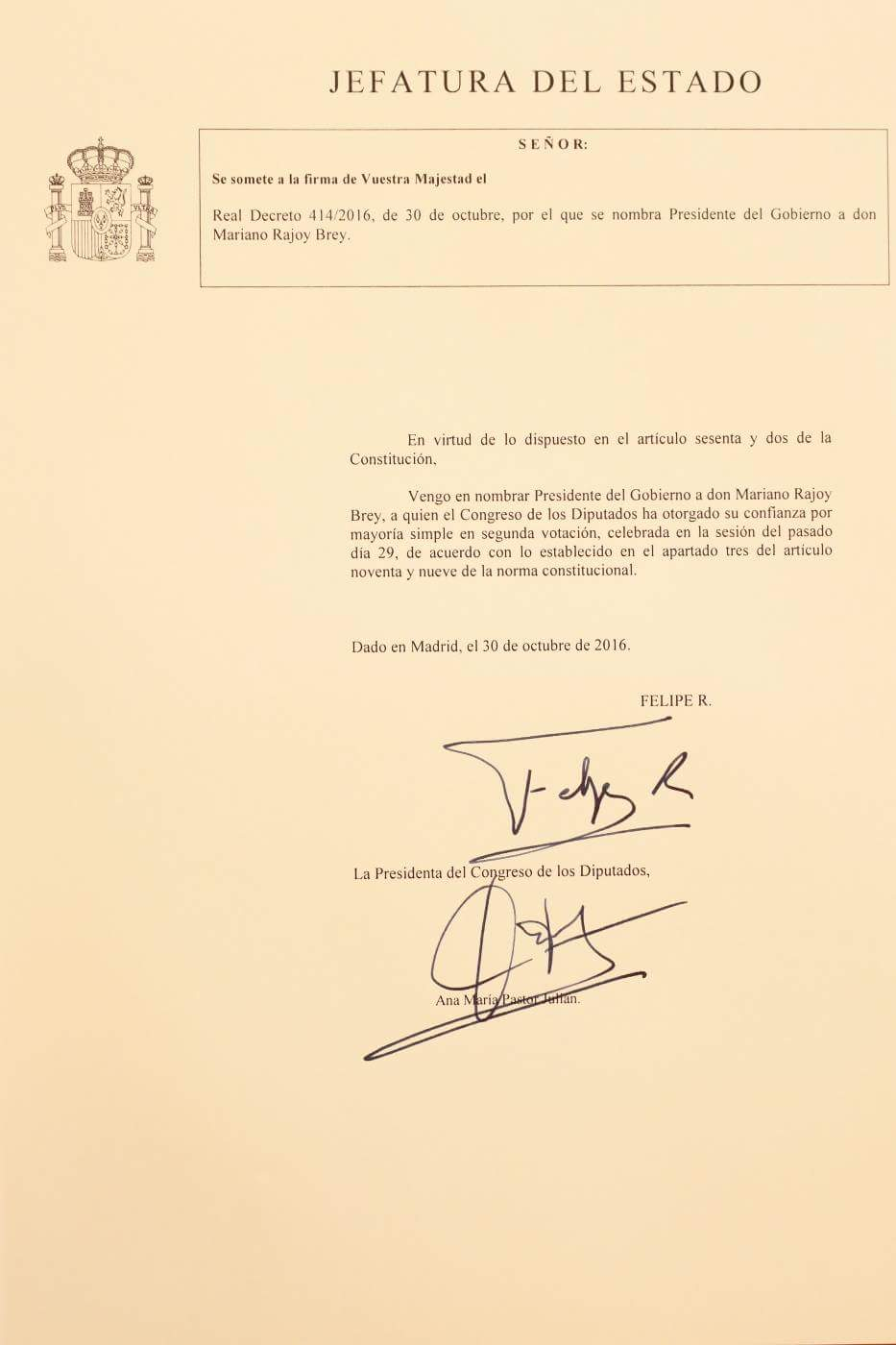
Royal decree appointing Mariano Rajoy as prime minister.

The Real decreto (Spanish for "Royal decree"), in Spanish law, is a regulation issued by the Monarch on the advice of the prime minister or the Council of Ministers, adopted by virtue of its regulatory power. As such, it is hierarchically inferior to the law, although superior to other regulatory norms. The adjective "royal" refers to the fact that, although agreed by the Government, it is always signed by the Sovereign.

While the royal decree is the work of the executive branch, the law is the work of the legislative branch. For its part, the royal decree must be issued at the proposal of the prime minister or the full Government, while other types of regulations, such as the ministerial order, can be approved by a single-person body. Some royal decrees, such as the appointment of the prime minister or, in certain cases, the dissolution of Parliament, are issued at the proposal of the president of the Congress of Deputies.

However, the content must not be confused with the form of approval: the administrative acts of the Council of Ministers also take the form of a royal decree, which is, therefore, the form in which the act takes place, but its content has no normative force.

== See also ==
- Letters patent
- Royal Decree-Law (Spain)
- Royal Legislative Decree (Spain)
