= Spanish Constitution of 1876 =

Former constitution of Spain

Spanish Constitution
- Flag of Spain during the Bourbon Restoration.
- Ratified: 30 June 1876
- Repealed: 9 December 1931

Full text
- Spanish Constitution of 1876 at Wikisource

The Spanish Constitution of 1876 (Spanish: Constitución española de 1876), was the constitution enacted after the restoration of the Spanish monarchy. The constitution was a conservative text. It came into effect on 30 June 1876. It also established equivalent rights to Puerto Ricans as citizens of the Spanish crown.

It remained in force until the coup d'etat by Miguel Primo de Rivera in 1923, which made it the longest lasting constitution of Spain until the 1978 Constitution passed it in 2024.
