= José Canalejas y Méndez =

Prime Minister of Spain from 1910 to 1912

The Most Excellent José Canalejas
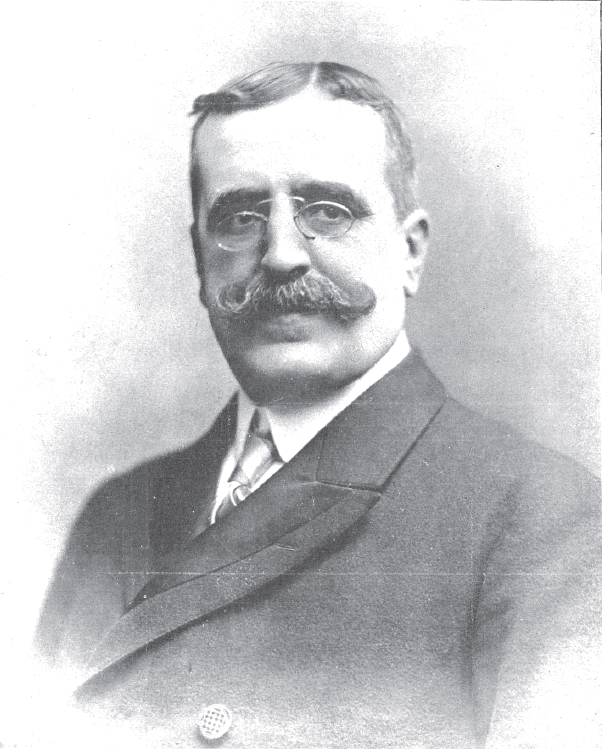

Prime Minister of Spain
- In office 9 February 1910 – 12 November 1912
- Monarch: Alfonso XIII
- Deputy: Manuel García Prieto
- Preceded by: Segismundo Moret y Prendergast
- Succeeded by: Álvaro Figueroa, Count Romanones

President of the Congress of Deputies
- In office 19 January 1906 – 30 March 1907
- Monarch: Alfonso XIII
- Preceded by: Antonio Aguilar y Correa
- Succeeded by: Eduardo Dato

Minister of Development of Spain
- In office 12 June – 30 November 1888
- Monarch: Alfonso XIII
- Regent: Maria Christina of Austria
- Prime Minister: Práxedes Mateo Sagasta
- Preceded by: Carlos Navarro Rodrigo
- Succeeded by: José Álvarez de Toledo y Acuña

Minister of Grace and Justice of Spain
- In office 11 December 1888 – 21 January 1890
- Monarch: Alfonso XIII
- Regent: Maria Christina of Austria
- Prime Minister: Práxedes Mateo Sagasta
- Preceded by: Manuel Alonso Martínez
- Succeeded by: Joaquín López Puigcerver
- In office 29 June 1911 – 12 March 1912
- Monarch: Alfonso XIII
- Prime Minister: Himself
- Preceded by: Antonio Barroso Castillo
- Succeeded by: Trinitario Ruiz Valarino

Minister of Finance of Spain
- In office 17 December 1894 – 23 March 1895
- Monarch: Alfonso XIII
- Regent: Maria Christina of Austria
- Prime Minister: Práxedes Mateo Sagasta
- Preceded by: Amós Salvador Rodrigáñez
- Succeeded by: Juan Navarro Reverter

Minister of Agriculture, Industry, Trade and Public Works of Spain
- In office 19 March – 31 May 1902
- Monarch: Alfonso XIII
- Regent: Maria Christina of Austria
- Prime Minister: Práxedes Mateo Sagasta
- Preceded by: Miguel Villanueva y Gómez
- Succeeded by: Félix Suárez Inclán

Personal details
- Born: 31 July 1854 Ferrol, Spain
- Died: 12 November 1912 (aged 58) Madrid, Spain
- Cause of death: Assassination by gunshot
- Resting place: Pantheon of Illustrious Men
- Party: Liberal Party

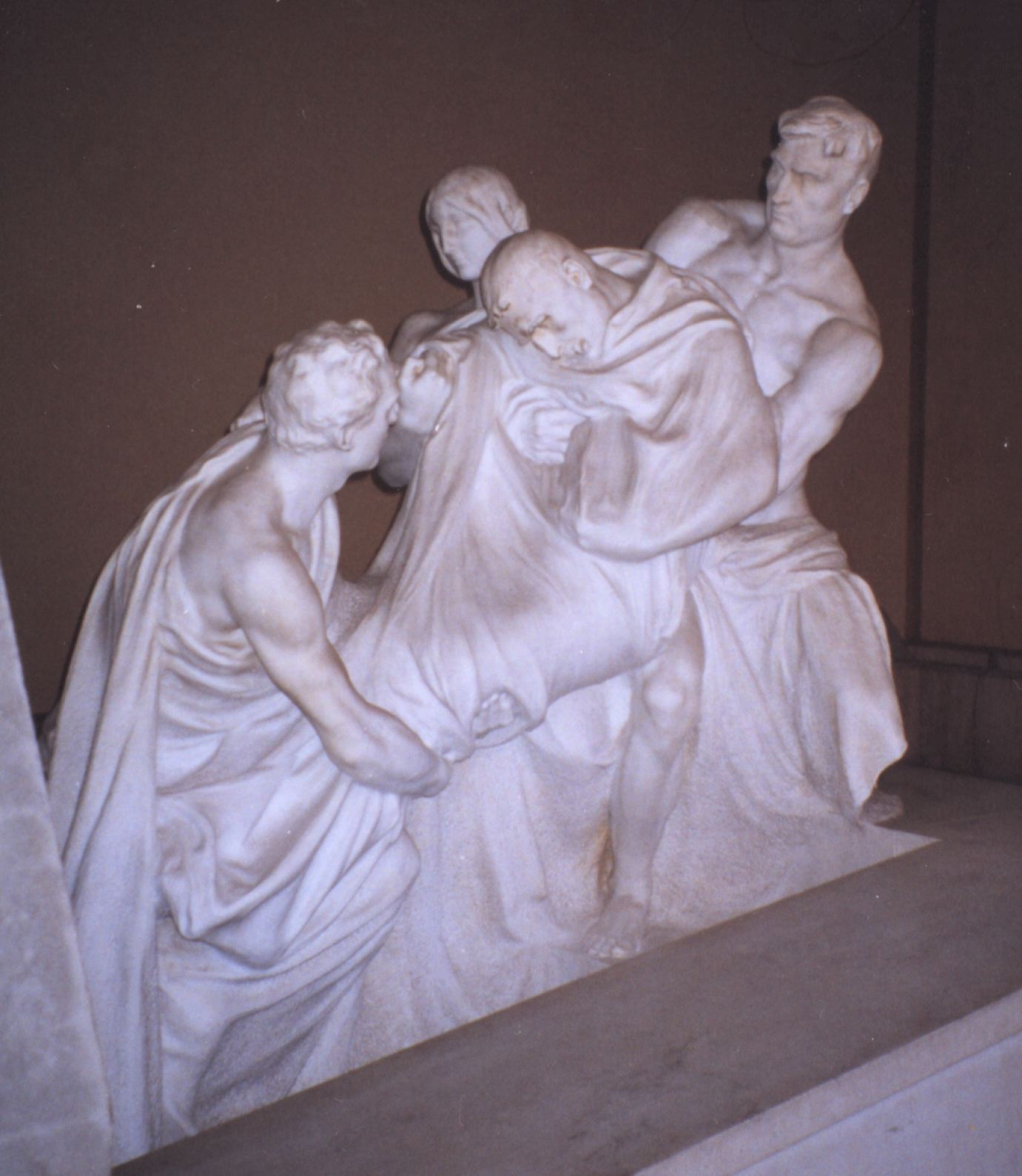
Tomb of José Canalejas in the Panteón de Hombres Ilustres, Madrid

José Canalejas y Méndez (31 July 1854 – 12 November 1912) was a Spanish politician who served as Prime Minister of Spain from 1910 until his assassination in 1912.

== Early life ==
Son of a railway engineer, politician and editor of the newspaper El Eco Ferrolano José Canalejas y Casas and of María del Amparo Méndez Romero. He moved with his family to Madrid, and in October 1867 he enrolled in the Instituto San Isidro, "because at that time the incorporated schools could not teach the last two years of the six which made up the baccalaureate ». Already at the Central University of Madrid, he obtained the degrees of law in 1871 and Philosophy in 1872, and the degree of doctor in both faculties. In 1873 he was assistant professor, but failed in two chair examinations, so he left teaching. He joined the company of the Railways of Madrid to Ciudad Real and Badajoz, where he became secretary general and He defended the company as a lawyer in lawsuits with other Spanish railway companies.

== Political career ==
In 1881, Canalejas was elected deputy for Soria. Two years later, he was appointed under-secretary for the Prime Minister's department under Posada Herrera; he became minister of justice in 1888 and finance from 1894 to 1895. A brief spell as Minister of Agriculture, Industry and Commerce from March to May 1902 ended after only two months, when he resigned as he regarded the Sagasta Ministry weak and "incapable of safeguarding the Sovereignty of the State in view of the encroachments of the Vatican".

He served as President of the Congress of Deputies (the equivalent to the Anglo-Saxon office of parliamentary Speaker) from 1906 to 1907.

=== Canalejas Ministry ===
In 1909, after the bloody confrontations of the "Tragic Week" in Barcelona, Antonio Maura resigned and Segismundo Moret was again appointed prime minister. Moret was forced to resign in February 1910 when he was replaced by Canalejas who became Prime Minister and chief of the Liberal party. Moret denounced the Canalejas Ministry as "a democratic flag being used to cover reactionary merchandise".

While in office, Canalejas (with the support of his sovereign, Alfonso XIII) introduced several electoral reforms that aimed to win working-class support for moderately conservative policies; to curb the power of independent political bosses, quite common at the time, especially in rural areas; to weaken excesses of Catholic educational clericalism without threatening the Catholic Church as such; and to turn Spain into a true democracy. These policies successfully faced the social turmoil that radicals had been creating within Spain (and which had led, in 1909, to a brief but bloody unrest in Barcelona). During his government, Canalejas implemented several significant reforms. He abolished the system of consumos (indirect taxes), introduced compulsory military service to replace the previous draft lottery (quintas), restricted the establishment of new religious orders through the so-called “Ley del Candado” (Padlock Law), and promoted the creation of the Mancomunidad of Catalonia, a federation of Catalan provinces aimed at coordinating regional administration.

== Death ==
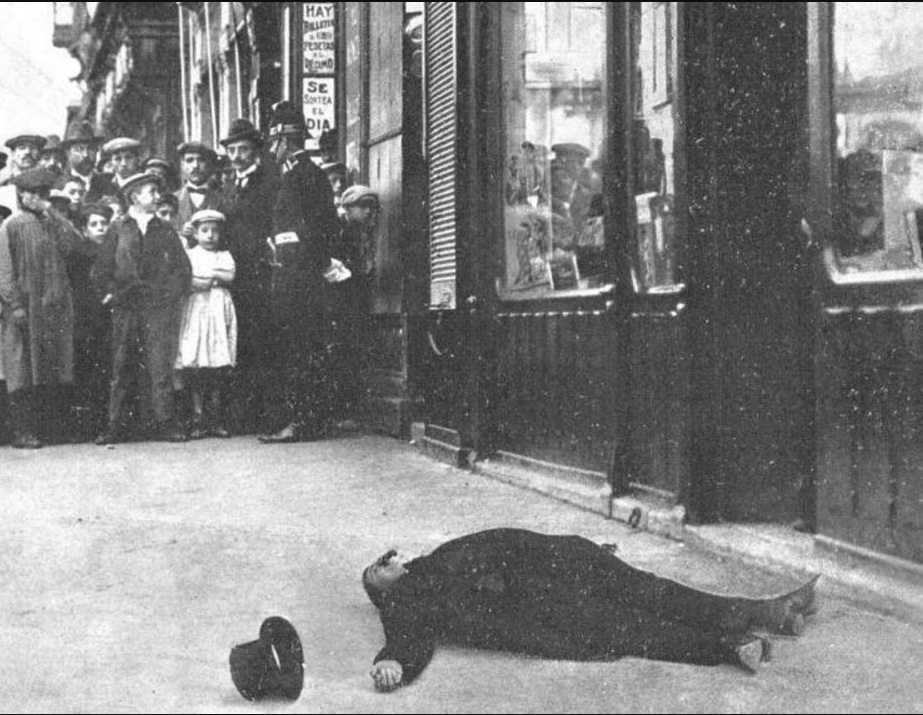
The body of José Canalejas in the Puerta del Sol after being shot

On 12 November 1912, while Canalejas was window-shopping the literary novelties of the day from a bookstore in central Madrid, he was fatally shot by anarchist Manuel Pardiñas.

== Legacy ==
Canalejas believed in the possibility of a monarchy open to a thoroughgoing democratic policy both in economic and in civil and political matters. Salvador de Madariaga, the liberal historian, argued that the disasters Spain experienced during the 1930s could be traced to Canalejas' murder, given that this murder deprived King Alfonso of one of his few genuine statesmen.
