= Liberal Party (Spain, 1880) =

1880–1931 political party in Spain

Liberal Party Partido Liberal
- Leader: List: Mateo Sagasta, Eugenio Montero, José Canalejas, Segismundo Moret, Count of Romanones, Marquis of Alhucemas
- Founded: 23 May 1880
- Dissolved: 1931
- Merger of: Constitutional Party; Radical Party
- Ideology: Liberalism (Spanish); Territorial autonomism
- Political position: Centre

The Liberal Party (Spanish: Partido Liberal), originally called Liberal Fusionist Party (Spanish: Partido Liberal-Fusionista, PLF) until 1885, was a Spanish political party created in 1880 by Práxedes Mateo Sagasta. With the Conservative Party of Antonio Cánovas del Castillo, it formed a two-party system of alternating governments, the turno, which characterised the Spanish Restoration during the late 19th century and the early 20th century.

== History ==
It combined republicans who did not accept the new law reflected in the Constitution of 1876 as well as monarchists, members of the Constitutional Party of general Francisco Serrano, of the Partido Radical of Manuel Ruiz Zorrilla, the "posibilistas" of Emilio Castelar and other military groupings.

Its political programme included achieving universal male suffrage, which was achieved in 1890; liberty of religious association; and the separation of powers. Although it could be classified as a dynastic party, its membership included at the start of the 20th century some politicians who would later become Republicans, such as Niceto Alcalá Zamora.

The system of political alternation characterising the Restoration began when Cánovas ceded power to Sagasta and he formed the first government of 8 February 1881, which started the first stage of the system that would see three liberal governments (two headed by Sagasta and one by José Posada).

The second stage began when the system was institutionalised and endorsed in 1885 when both parties signed the Pact of El Pardo, which established that the parties would alternate in power after the death of Alfonso XII of Spain, which was guaranteed by the caciques networks with which both parties were involved across Spain. The pact kept out of power radical ideologies like anarchism, socialism and republicanism, which could threaten the monarchic regime.

In 1898, the first split in the Liberal Party occurred by Germán Gamazo abandoning the party and leading a breakaway group (the gamacistas), which ended up merging with the Conservative Party. After Sagasta's death in 1903, a leadership contest occurred between Eugenio Montero Ríos and Segismundo Moret, which eventually led to José Canalejas leading the party. He tried to reform it and bring it closer to the reality of the country, but his attempts to evolve the party were cut short by his murder in 1912. That reopened a leadership struggle between two new protagonists, the Conde de Romanones and Manuel García Prieto, and led the party into a deep crisis, coinciding with the disintegration of the political system in which it had played a major part. The disintegration ended in 1931 with the dictatorship of Primo de Rivera and finally the monarchy of Alfonso XIII of Spain.

== Party leaders ==
Image	Leader	Term
	Práxedes Mateo Sagasta	1876-1902
	Eugenio Montero Ríos	1902-1905
	Segismundo Moret	1905-1910
	José Canalejas y Méndez	1910-1912
	Count of Romanones	1912-1918
	Marquis of Alhucemas and Count of Romanones	1918-1923
	Vacant (dictatorship of Miguel Primo de Rivera)	1923-1930
	Count of Romanones	1931

== Splits ==
Faction	Leader	Dates
Dynastic Left	José López Domínguez	1881-1886
Martists	Cristino Martos	1890-1893
Gamacists	Germán Gamazo and Antonio Maura	1898-1902
Monarchist Democrats	Eugenio Montero Ríos	1902-1910
Liberal Democrats	Manuel García Prieto	1913-1923
Liberal Left	Santiago Alba	1917-1923
Romanonists	Count of Romanones	1918-1923
Agrarian Liberals	Rafael Gasset	1918-1923
Zamorists	Niceto Alcalá-Zamora	1919-1923

== Electoral results ==
Election	Seats	+/-
1876	48 / 391	New
1879	49 / 392	▲1
1881	297 / 392	▲246
1884	43 / 433	▼254
1886	309 / 434	▲266
1891	100 / 446	▼209
1893	298 / 443	▲198
1896	111 / 447	▼187
1898	324 / 447	▲213
1899	92 / 402	▼232
1901	246 / 402	▲154
1903	95 / 403	▼151
1905	226 / 404	▲131
1907	72 / 404	▼154
1910	223 / 404	▲151
1914	84 / 408	▼139
1916	228 / 409	▲144
1918	40 / 409	▼188
1919	41 / 409	▲1
1920	32 / 409	▼9
1923	223 / 409	▲191

== See also ==
- Liberal Conservative Party
- Political System of the Restoration (Spain)
