= List of prime ministers of Spain =

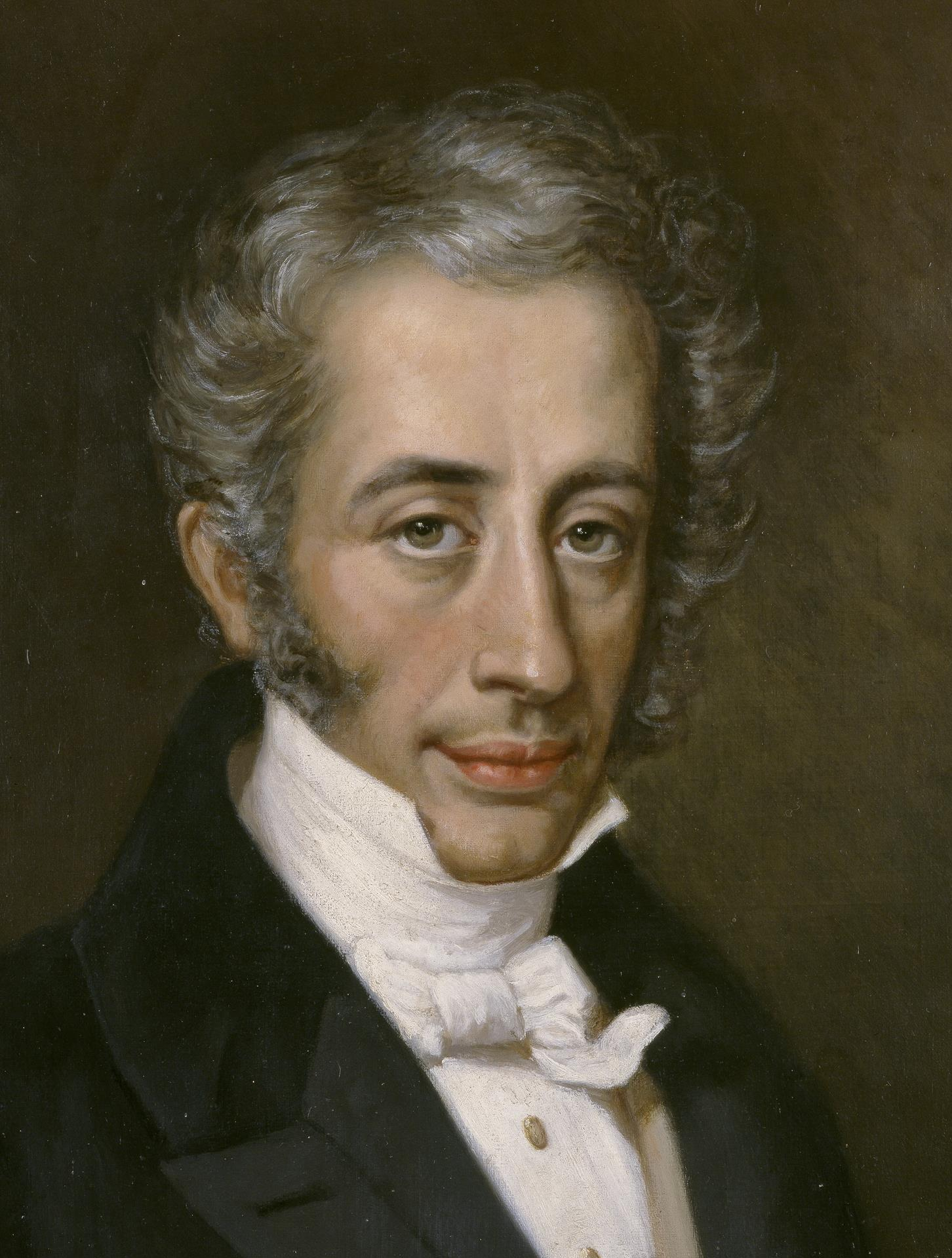
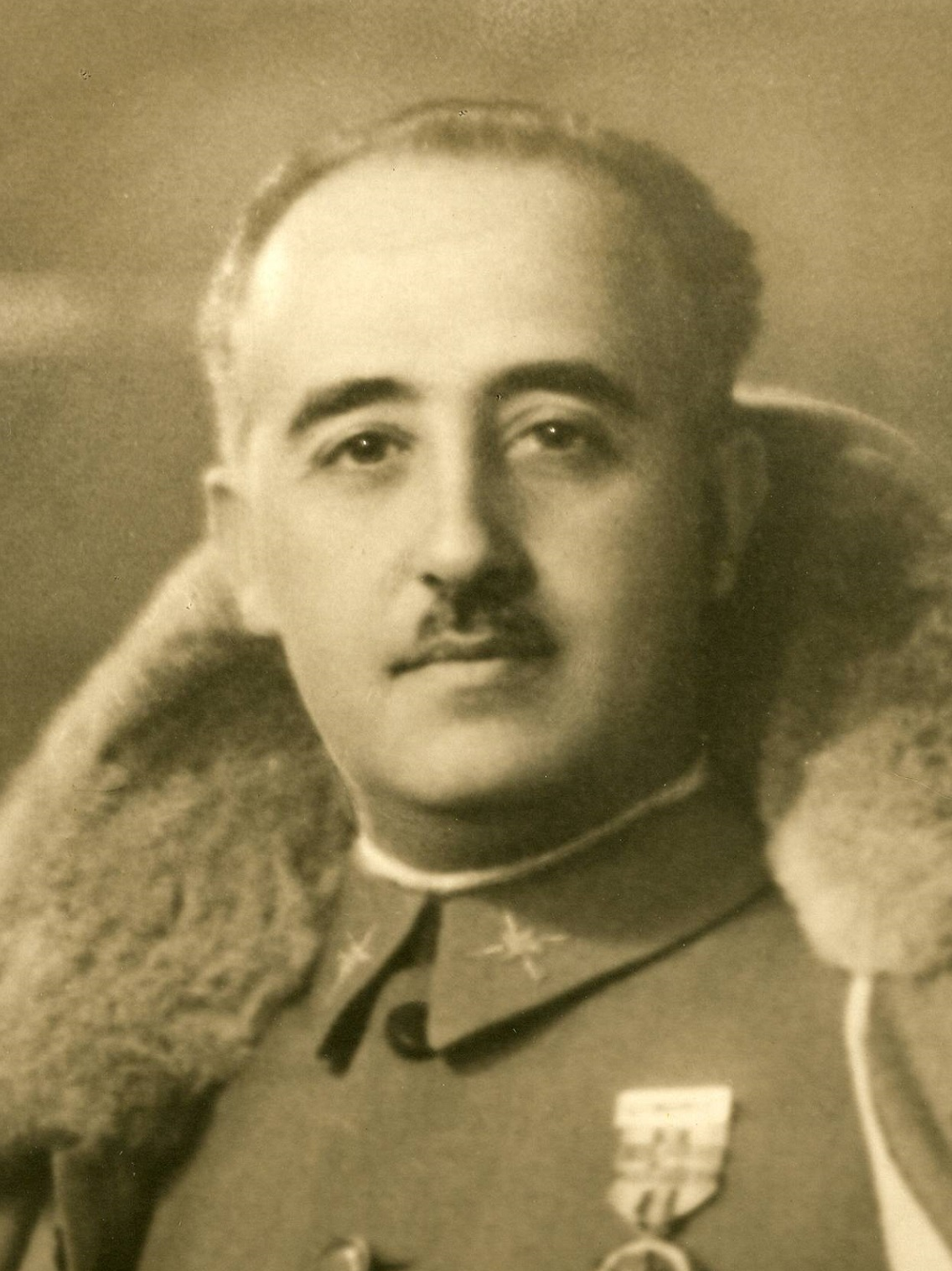
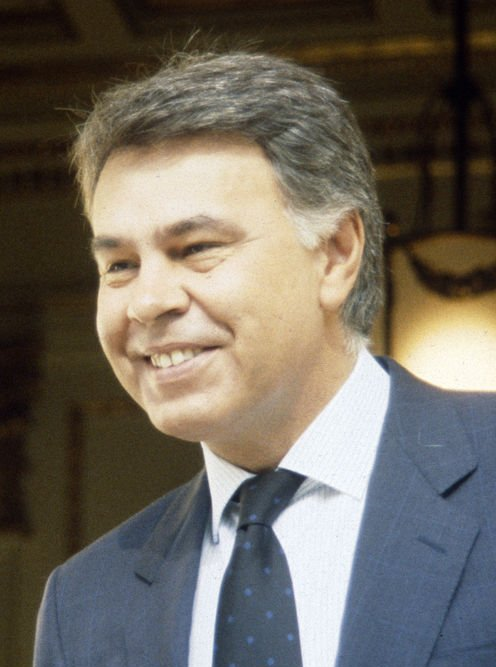
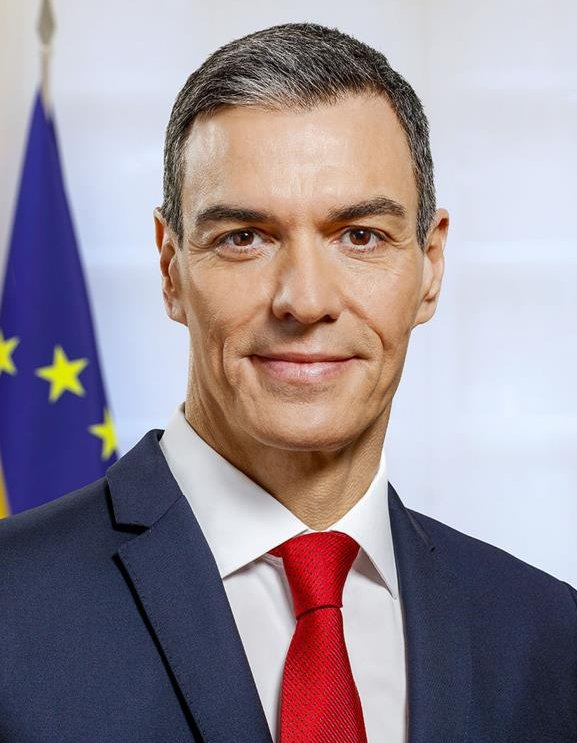
- Top left: Francisco Martínez de la Rosa was the first prime minister constitutionally referred to as such.
- Top right: Francisco Franco was the person serving the longest as head of government, under his own dictatorship.
- Bottom left: Felipe González was the longest-serving democratically elected prime minister.
- Bottom right: Pedro Sánchez is the current prime minister (as well as the second longest-serving democratically elected).

The prime minister of Spain is the head of government of Spain. There is no specific date as to when the office of prime minister first appeared as the role was not created, but rather evolved over a period of time through a merger of duties. Modern historians have not managed to agree who the first prime minister of Spain was, but Francisco Martínez de la Rosa was the first prime minister recognized by a constitutional law (the Spanish Royal Statute of 1834).

In contemporary Spain, the first prime minister of the Kingdom of Spain since the approval of the Constitution of 1978 was Adolfo Suárez. Due to the gradual evolution of the post, the title has been applied to early prime ministers retroactively. The following list therefore includes those who have been referred to as various other titles since the creation of the Council of Ministers in 1823.

Since the reign of Philip V, prime ministers have received several names, such as First Secretary of State (until 1834), President of the Council of Ministers (1834–1868; 1874–1923; 1925–1939), President of the Executive Power (1874) or President of the Government (1973–present), among others. Between 1938 and 1973, the post of President of the Government was personally linked to the person serving as Head of State.

== Before 1823 ==
There is no specific date when the office of prime minister first appeared as the role was not created, but rather evolved over a period of time through merger of duties. The government was led by a Valido, a favourite of the Monarch or the ruling Regent. Since 1621, there was also a Secretary of State of the Universal Bureau (Secretario de Estado y del Despacho Universal), but this seems to have been rather a subordinate position.

Later, the reforms introduced by Phillip V in the 1710s established several secretaries of state for specific government areas, and the secretary of State for Foreign Affairs (Secretario de Estado y del Despacho de Estado) was eventually known as the First Secretary of State due to its de facto role as primer minister. This position was consolidated with the establishment of the Council of Ministers in 1823 which the First Secretary of State chaired over in the king's absence, and in 1834 the First Secretary of State became known as President of the Council of Ministers.

=== Secretaries of State and the Universal Bureau ===
Picture	Name	From	Until	Monarch (Reign)
	Pedro Fernández del Campo y Salvatierra, Marquis of Mejorada	11 July 1705	15 April 1714	King Philip V (1700–1724)
	Manuel de Vadillo y Velasco	15 April 1714	30 November 1714	King Philip V (1700–1724)
	José de Grimaldo y Gutiérrez de Solórzano; Marquis of Grimaldo (1st time)	30 November 1714	14 January 1724	King Philip V (1700–1724)
	Juan Bautista de Orendáin y Azpilicueta (1st time)	14 January 1724	4 September 1724	King Louis I (1724)
	José de Grimaldo y Gutiérrez de Solórzano; Marquis of Grimaldo (2nd time)	4 September 1724	12 December 1725	King Philip V (1724–1746)
	Juan Guillermo Ripperdá; Duke and Baron of Ripperdá	12 December 1725	14 April 1726	King Philip V (1724–1746)
	José de Grimaldo y Gutiérrez de Solórzano; Marquis of Grimaldo (3rd time)	14 April 1726	1 October 1726	King Philip V (1724–1746)
	Juan Bautista de Orendáin y Azpilicueta; Marquis of la Paz (2nd time)	1 October 1726	21 October 1734	King Philip V (1724–1746)

=== First Secretaries of State ===
Picture	Name	From	Until	Monarch (Reign)
	José de Patiño y Rosales	21 October 1734	3 November 1736	King Philip V (1724–1746)
	Sebastián de la Cuadra y Llerena; 1st Marquis of Villarías	26 November 1736	4 December 1746	King Philip V (1724–1746)
	José de Carvajal y Lancáster	4 December 1746	9 April 1754	King Ferdinand VI (1746–1759)
	Fernando de Silva Mendoza y Toledo; Duke of Huéscar; Acting First Secretary of State	9 April 1754	15 May 1754	King Ferdinand VI (1746–1759)
	Ricardo Wall	15 May 1754	10 August 1759	King Ferdinand VI (1746–1759)
	Ricardo Wall	10 August 1759	9 October 1763	King Charles III (1759–1788)
	Pablo Jerónimo de Grimaldi y Pallavicini; Duke of Grimaldi	9 October 1763	19 February 1777	King Charles III (1759–1788)
	José Moñino y Redondo; Count of Floridablanca	19 February 1777	14 December 1788	King Charles III (1759–1788)
	José Moñino y Redondo; Count of Floridablanca	14 December 1788	28 February 1792	King Charles IV (1788–1808)
	Pedro Pablo Abarca de Bolea y Ximénez de Urrea; Count of Aranda; Acting First Secretary of State	28 February 1792	15 November 1792	King Charles IV (1788–1808)
	Manuel de Godoy y Álvarez de Faria Ríos; Duke of Alcudia	15 November 1792	28 March 1798	King Charles IV (1788–1808)
	Francisco Saavedra de Sangronis; Acting First Secretary of State until 6 September 1798	30 March 1798	21 February 1799	King Charles IV (1788–1808)
	Mariano Luis de Urquijo y Muga; Acting First Secretary of State	12 February 1799	13 December 1799	King Charles IV (1788–1808)
	Pedro Cevallos Guerra (1st time)	13 December 1799	3 March 1808	King Charles IV (1788–1808)
	Gonzalo O'Farrill y Herrera; Acting First Secretary of State	3 March 1808	19 March 1808	King Charles IV (1788–1808)
	Pedro Cevallos Guerra (2nd time)	19 March 1808	7 July 1808	King Ferdinand VII (1808)
	Mariano Luis de Urquijo y Muga (2nd time)	7 July 1808	27 June 1813	King Joseph I (1808–1813)
	Juan O'Donojú O'Ryan; Acting First Secretary of State	10 October 1813	17 October 1813	King Joseph I (1808–1813)
	Fernando de Laserna; Acting First Secretary of State	17 October 1813	3 December 1813	King Joseph I (1808–1813)
	José Luyando; Acting First Secretary of State	3 December 1813	4 May 1814	King Ferdinand VII (1813–1833)
	José Miguel de Carvajal-Vargas y Manrique de Lara; Duke of San Carlos	4 May 1814	15 November 1814	King Ferdinand VII (1813–1833)
	Pedro Cevallos Guerra (3rd time)	15 November 1814	24 January 1816	King Ferdinand VII (1813–1833)
	Juan Esteban Lozano de Torres	24 January 1816	26 January 1816	King Ferdinand VII (1813–1833)
	Pedro Cevallos Guerra (4th time)	26 January 1816	30 October 1816	King Ferdinand VII (1813–1833)
	José García de León y Pizarro	30 October 1816	14 September 1818	King Ferdinand VII (1813–1833)
	Carlos Martínez de Irujo y Tacón; Marquis of Casa Irujo; Acting First Secretary of State	14 September 1818	12 June 1819	King Ferdinand VII (1813–1833)
	Manuel González Salmón y Gómez de Torres; Acting First Secretary of State	12 June 1819	12 September 1819	King Ferdinand VII (1813–1833)
	Joaquín José Melgarejo y Saurín; Duke of San Fernando de Quiroga	12 September 1819	18 March 1820	King Ferdinand VII (1813–1833)
	Juan Jabat Aztal; Acting First Secretary of State	18 March 1820		King Ferdinand VII (1813–1833)
	Evaristo Pérez de Castro y Brito	18 March 1820	2 March 1821	King Ferdinand VII (1813–1833)
	Joaquín Anduaga Cuenca; Acting First Secretary of State	2 March 1821	23 April 1821	King Ferdinand VII (1813–1833)
	Francisco de Paula Escudero; Acting First Secretary of State	23 April 1821		King Ferdinand VII (1813–1833)
	Eusebio Bardají y Azara	23 April 1821	8 January 1822	King Ferdinand VII (1813–1833)
	Ramón López Pelegrín; Acting First Secretary of State	8 January 1822	24 January 1822	King Ferdinand VII (1813–1833)
	José Gabriel de Silva y Bazán; Marquis of Santa Cruz	24 January 1822	30 January 1822	King Ferdinand VII (1813–1833)
	Ramón López Pelegrín; Acting First Secretary of State	30 January 1822	28 February 1822	King Ferdinand VII (1813–1833)
	Francisco Martínez de la Rosa	28 February 1822	5 August 1822	King Ferdinand VII (1813–1833)
	Evaristo Fernández de San Miguel y Valledor; Acting First Secretary of State from 28 February 1822	5 August 1822	25 April 1823	King Ferdinand VII (1813–1833)
	José Manuel Vadillo; Acting First Secretary of State	25 April 1823	7 May 1823	King Ferdinand VII (1813–1833)
	Santiago Usoz y Mozi; Acting First Secretary of State	7 May 1823	13 May 1823	King Ferdinand VII (1813–1833)
	José María Pando de la Riva y Ramírez de Laredo	13 May 1823	29 August 1823	King Ferdinand VII (1813–1833)
	Luis María de Salazar y Salazar; Acting First Secretary of State	29 August 1823	4 September 1823	King Ferdinand VII (1813–1833)
	Juan Antonio Yandiola Garay; Acting First Secretary of State	4 September 1823	6 September 1823	King Ferdinand VII (1813–1833)
	José Luyando (2nd time)	6 September 1823	1 October 1823	King Ferdinand VII (1813–1833)
	Víctor Damián Sáez y Sánchez-Mayor; Acting First Secretary of State until 7 August 1823 (counter-government until 1 October 1823.)	25 April 1823	19 November 1823	King Ferdinand VII (1813–1833)

== List of officeholders ==
=== Office title ===
- First Secretary of State (1823–1834)
- President of the Council of Ministers (1834–1868; 1869–1873; 1874–1923; 1925–1931; 1931–1939)
- President of the Provisional Government and of the Council of Ministers (1868–1869)
- President of the Executive Power (1869; 1873–1874)
- Head of the Government and President of the Military Directory (1923–1925)
- President of the Provisional Government (1931)
- Head of State and President of the Government (1938–1973)
- President of the Government (1973–present)

=== Kingdom of Spain (1823–1868) ===
Governments:

- Absolutist
- Moderate
- Progressive
- Liberal Union
- Mixed coalition

Portrait	Name (Birth–Death)	Term of office			Party	Government Composition	Election	Head of State (Tenure)	Ref.
Portrait	Name (Birth–Death)	Took office	Left office	Duration	Party	Government Composition	Election	Head of State (Tenure)	Ref.
	Víctor Damián Sáez (1776–1839)	19 November 1823 (Note: Creation of the Council of Ministers.)	2 December 1823	13 days	Nonpartisan	Sáez	N/A	King; Ferdinand VII (1813–1833)	
	Carlos Martínez de Irujo; Marquis of Casa Irujo (1763–1824)	2 December 1823	25 December 1823	23 days	Nonpartisan	Irujo	N/A	King; Ferdinand VII (1813–1833)	
	Narciso Heredia; Count of Ofalia (1775–1847)	25 December 1823	11 July 1824	199 days	Nonpartisan	Ofalia I	N/A	King; Ferdinand VII (1813–1833)	
	Francisco Cea Bermúdez (1779–1850)	11 July 1824	24 October 1825	1 year, 105 days	Nonpartisan	Cea Bermúdez I	N/A	King; Ferdinand VII (1813–1833)	
	Captain General; Pedro de Alcántara; Álvarez de Toledo; 13th Duke of the Infantado (1768–1841)	24 October 1825	19 August 1826	299 days	Nonpartisan	Infantado	N/A	King; Ferdinand VII (1813–1833)	
	Manuel González Salmón (1778–1832)	19 August 1826	18 January 1832 #	5 years, 152 days	Nonpartisan	Salmón	N/A	King; Ferdinand VII (1813–1833)	
	Antonio de Saavedra; 7th Count of la Alcudia (interim) (1777–1842)	20 January 1832	1 October 1832	255 days	Nonpartisan	Alcudia (interim)	N/A	King; Ferdinand VII (1813–1833)	
	Francisco Cea Bermúdez (1779–1850)	1 October 1832	15 January 1834	1 year, 106 days	Nonpartisan	Cea Bermúdez II	N/A	King; Ferdinand VII (1813–1833)	
	Francisco Cea Bermúdez (1779–1850)	1 October 1832	15 January 1834	1 year, 106 days	Nonpartisan	Cea Bermúdez II	N/A	Queen; Regent; Maria; Christina of the Two; Sicilies (1833–1840)	
	Francisco Martínez de la Rosa (1787–1862)	15 January 1834	7 June 1835	1 year, 143 days	Moderate	Martínez de la Rosa II; PMod	N/A	Queen; Regent; Maria; Christina of the Two; Sicilies (1833–1840)	
	Francisco Martínez de la Rosa (1787–1862)	15 January 1834	7 June 1835	1 year, 143 days	Moderate	Martínez de la Rosa II; PMod	1834	Queen; Regent; Maria; Christina of the Two; Sicilies (1833–1840)	
	José María Queipo de Llano; 7th Count of Toreno (1786–1843)	7 June 1835	14 September 1835	99 days	Moderate	Toreno; PMod	1834	Queen; Regent; Maria; Christina of the Two; Sicilies (1833–1840)	
	Miguel Ricardo de Álava (Note: Appointed as the de jure officeholder, Miguel Ricardo de Álava rejected his nomination and did not formally take office. Julián Villalba (14–17 September) and Juan Álvarez Mendizábal (17–25 September) were nominally appointed to serve in interim capacity; the latter became the de facto officeholder after Álava's renounce.) (1772–1843)	14 September 1835	25 September 1835	11 days	Progressive	Álava–Mendizabal; PProg	1834	Queen; Regent; Maria; Christina of the Two; Sicilies (1833–1840)	
	Juan Álvarez Mendizábal (interim) (1790–1853)	25 September 1835	15 May 1836	233 days	Progressive	Álava–Mendizabal; PProg	1834	Queen; Regent; Maria; Christina of the Two; Sicilies (1833–1840)	
	Juan Álvarez Mendizábal (interim) (1790–1853)	25 September 1835	15 May 1836	233 days	Progressive	Álava–Mendizabal; PProg	Feb. 1836	Queen; Regent; Maria; Christina of the Two; Sicilies (1833–1840)	
	Francisco Javier de Istúriz (1790–1871)	15 May 1836	14 August 1836	91 days	Moderate	Istúriz I PMod	Feb. 1836	Queen; Regent; Maria; Christina of the Two; Sicilies (1833–1840)	
	Francisco Javier de Istúriz (1790–1871)	15 May 1836	14 August 1836	91 days	Moderate	Istúriz I PMod	Jul. 1836	Queen; Regent; Maria; Christina of the Two; Sicilies (1833–1840)	
	José María Calatrava (1781–1846)	14 August 1836	10 March 1837	208 days	Progressive	Calatrava; PProg	Jul. 1836	Queen; Regent; Maria; Christina of the Two; Sicilies (1833–1840)	
	José María Calatrava (1781–1846)	14 August 1836	10 March 1837	208 days	Progressive	Calatrava; PProg	Oct. 1836	Queen; Regent; Maria; Christina of the Two; Sicilies (1833–1840)	
During this interval, Minister of State Ildefonso Díez de Rivera served as acting officeholder. (Note: José María Calatrava was the de jure officeholder from 14 August 1836 to 18 August 1837. As a result of illness, Minister of State Ildefonso Díez de Rivera took on the ordinary discharge of duties from 10 March to 3 April 1837.)						Calatrava; PProg	Oct. 1836	Queen; Regent; Maria; Christina of the Two; Sicilies (1833–1840)	
	José María Calatrava (1781–1846)	3 April 1837	18 August 1837	137 days	Progressive	Calatrava; PProg	Oct. 1836	Queen; Regent; Maria; Christina of the Two; Sicilies (1833–1840)	
	Lieutenant General; Baldomero Espartero; Count of Luchana (1793–1879)	18 August 1837	18 October 1837	61 days	Progressive	Espartero I PProg	Oct. 1836	Queen; Regent; Maria; Christina of the Two; Sicilies (1833–1840)	
	Eusebio Bardají Azara (1776–1842)	18 October 1837	16 December 1837	59 days	Moderate	Bardají; PMod	1837	Queen; Regent; Maria; Christina of the Two; Sicilies (1833–1840)	
	Narciso Heredia; Count of Ofalia (1775–1847)	16 December 1837	6 September 1838	264 days	Moderate	Ofalia II; PMod	1837	Queen; Regent; Maria; Christina of the Two; Sicilies (1833–1840)	
	Bernardino Fernández de Velasco; 14th Duke of Frías (1783–1851)	6 September 1838	9 December 1838	94 days	Moderate	Frías; PMod	1837	Queen; Regent; Maria; Christina of the Two; Sicilies (1833–1840)	
	Evaristo Pérez de Castro (1778–1849)	9 December 1838	20 July 1840	1 year, 224 days	Moderate	Pérez de Castro; PMod	1837	Queen; Regent; Maria; Christina of the Two; Sicilies (1833–1840)	
	Evaristo Pérez de Castro (1778–1849)	9 December 1838	20 July 1840	1 year, 224 days	Moderate	Pérez de Castro; PMod	1839	Queen; Regent; Maria; Christina of the Two; Sicilies (1833–1840)	
	Evaristo Pérez de Castro (1778–1849)	9 December 1838	20 July 1840	1 year, 224 days	Moderate	Pérez de Castro; PMod	1840	Queen; Regent; Maria; Christina of the Two; Sicilies (1833–1840)	
	Antonio González (1792–1876)	20 July 1840	12 August 1840	23 days	Progressive	González I PProg	1840	Queen; Regent; Maria; Christina of the Two; Sicilies (1833–1840)	
	Lieutenant General; Valentín Ferraz (1792–1866)	12 August 1840	28 August 1840	16 days	Progressive	Ferraz; PProg	1840	Queen; Regent; Maria; Christina of the Two; Sicilies (1833–1840)	
	Modesto Cortázar (interim) (1783–1862)	29 August 1840	11 September 1840	13 days	Progressive	Cortázar (interim); PProg	1840	Queen; Regent; Maria; Christina of the Two; Sicilies (1833–1840)	
	Vicente Sancho (1784–1860)	11 September 1840 (Note: Appointed to the office on 11 September 1840 by the Queen Regent from her hideout in Valencia. The appointment arrived to the Espartero-controlled Madrid on the night of the 13th.)	16 September 1840	5 days	Progressive	Sancho; PProg	1840	Queen; Regent; Maria; Christina of the Two; Sicilies (1833–1840)	
	Captain General; Baldomero Espartero; Duke of la Victoria and Morella (1793–1879)	16 September 1840	10 May 1841	236 days	Progressive	Espartero II; PProg	1840	Queen; Regent; Maria; Christina of the Two; Sicilies (1833–1840)	
	Captain General; Baldomero Espartero; Duke of la Victoria and Morella (1793–1879)	16 September 1840	10 May 1841	236 days	Progressive	Espartero II; PProg	1840	Regent (Note: President of the Provisional Regency of the Realm (1840–1841), Regent of the Realm (1841–1843).); Baldomero; Espartero (1840–1843)	
	Captain General; Baldomero Espartero; Duke of la Victoria and Morella (1793–1879)	16 September 1840	10 May 1841	236 days	Progressive	Espartero II; PProg	1841	Regent; Baldomero; Espartero (1840–1843)	
	Joaquín María Ferrer (1777–1861)	10 May 1841	20 May 1841	10 days	Progressive (Esparterist)	Ferrer; PProg	1841	Regent; Baldomero; Espartero (1840–1843)	
	Antonio González (1792–1876)	20 May 1841	17 June 1842	1 year, 28 days	Progressive (Esparterist)	González II; PProg	1841	Regent; Baldomero; Espartero (1840–1843)	
	Captain General; José Ramón Rodil; Marquis of Rodil (1789–1853)	17 June 1842	9 May 1843	326 days	Progressive (Esparterist)	Rodil; PProg	1841	Regent; Baldomero; Espartero (1840–1843)	
	Captain General; José Ramón Rodil; Marquis of Rodil (1789–1853)	17 June 1842	9 May 1843	326 days	Progressive (Esparterist)	Rodil; PProg	Feb. 1843	Regent; Baldomero; Espartero (1840–1843)	
	Joaquín María López (1798–1855)	9 May 1843	19 May 1843	10 days	Progressive (Pure)	López I PProg–PMod	Feb. 1843	Regent; Baldomero; Espartero (1840–1843)	
	Álvaro Gómez Becerra (1771–1855)	19 May 1843	23 July 1843	65 days	Progressive (Esparterist)	Gómez Becerra; PProg	Feb. 1843	Regent; Baldomero; Espartero (1840–1843)	
	Joaquín María López (1798–1855)	23 July 1843	20 November 1843	120 days	Progressive (Pure)	López II; PProg–PMod	Feb. 1843	President of the Provisional; Government (1843)	
	Joaquín María López (1798–1855)	23 July 1843	20 November 1843	120 days	Progressive (Pure)	López II; PProg–PMod	Sep. 1843	President of the Provisional; Government (1843)	
	Joaquín María López (1798–1855)	23 July 1843	20 November 1843	120 days	Progressive (Pure)	López II; PProg–PMod	Sep. 1843	Queen; Isabella II (1843–1868)	
	Salustiano Olózaga (1805–1873)	20 November 1843	29 November 1843	9 days	Progressive (Pure)	Olózaga; PProg–PMod	Sep. 1843	Queen; Isabella II (1843–1868)	
	Luis González Bravo (1811–1871)	5 December 1843	3 May 1844	150 days	Moderate	González Bravo I PMod	Sep. 1843	Queen; Isabella II (1843–1868)	
	Captain General; Ramón María Narváez (1800–1868)	3 May 1844	11 February 1846	1 year, 284 days	Moderate	Narváez I PMod	Sep. 1843	Queen; Isabella II (1843–1868)	
	Captain General; Ramón María Narváez (1800–1868)	3 May 1844	11 February 1846	1 year, 284 days	Moderate	Narváez I PMod	1844	Queen; Isabella II (1843–1868)	
	Manuel Pando; 2nd Marquis of Miraflores (1792–1872)	12 February 1846	16 March 1846	32 days	Moderate	Miraflores I PMod	1844	Queen; Isabella II (1843–1868)	
	Captain General; Ramón María Narváez; Duke of Valencia (1800–1868)	16 March 1846	5 April 1846	20 days	Moderate	Narváez II; PMod	1844	Queen; Isabella II (1843–1868)	
	Francisco Javier de Istúriz (1790–1871)	5 April 1846	28 January 1847	298 days	Moderate	Istúriz II; PMod	1844	Queen; Isabella II (1843–1868)	
	Francisco Javier de Istúriz (1790–1871)	5 April 1846	28 January 1847	298 days	Moderate	Istúriz II; PMod	1846	Queen; Isabella II (1843–1868)	
	Carlos Martínez de Irujo; Duke of Sotomayor; 2nd Marquis of Casa Irujo (1802–1855)	28 January 1847	28 March 1847	59 days	Moderate	Sotomayor; PMod	1846	Queen; Isabella II (1843–1868)	
	Joaquín Francisco Pacheco (1808–1865)	28 March 1847	31 August 1847	156 days	Moderate	Pacheco; PMod	1846	Queen; Isabella II (1843–1868)	
	Florencio García Goyena (1783–1855)	12 September 1847	4 October 1847	22 days	Moderate	Goyena; PMod	1846	Queen; Isabella II (1843–1868)	
	Captain General; Ramón María Narváez; Duke of Valencia (1800–1868)	4 October 1847	19 October 1849	2 years, 15 days	Moderate	Narváez III; PMod	1846	Queen; Isabella II (1843–1868)	
	Serafín María de Sotto; 3rd Count of Clonard (1793–1862)	19 October 1849	20 October 1849	1 day	Moderate	De Sotto; PMod	1846	Queen; Isabella II (1843–1868)	
	Captain General; Ramón María Narváez; Duke of Valencia (1800–1868)	20 October 1849	10 January 1851	1 year, 82 days	Moderate	Narváez IV; PMod	1846	Queen; Isabella II (1843–1868)	
	Captain General; Ramón María Narváez; Duke of Valencia (1800–1868)	20 October 1849	10 January 1851	1 year, 82 days	Moderate	Narváez IV; PMod	1850	Queen; Isabella II (1843–1868)	
	Juan Bravo Murillo (1803–1873)	14 January 1851	14 December 1852	1 year, 335 days	Moderate	Bravo Murillo; PMod	1850	Queen; Isabella II (1843–1868)	
	Juan Bravo Murillo (1803–1873)	14 January 1851	14 December 1852	1 year, 335 days	Moderate	Bravo Murillo; PMod	1851	Queen; Isabella II (1843–1868)	
	Lieutenant General; Federico Roncali; Count of Alcoy (1809–1857)	14 December 1852	14 April 1853	121 days	Moderate	Roncali; PMod	1851	Queen; Isabella II (1843–1868)	
	Lieutenant General; Federico Roncali; Count of Alcoy (1809–1857)	14 December 1852	14 April 1853	121 days	Moderate	Roncali; PMod	1853	Queen; Isabella II (1843–1868)	
	Lieutenant General; Francisco Lersundi (1817–1874)	14 April 1853	19 September 1853	158 days	Moderate	Lersundi; PMod	1853	Queen; Isabella II (1843–1868)	
	Luis José Sartorius; Count of San Luis (1820–1871)	19 September 1853	17 July 1854	301 days	Moderate	Sartorius; PMod	1853	Queen; Isabella II (1843–1868)	
	Lieutenant General; Fernando Fernández de Córdova (1809–1883)	17 July 1854	18 July 1854	1 day	Moderate	Córdova; PMod	1853	Queen; Isabella II (1843–1868)	
	Ángel de Saavedra; Duke of Rivas (1791–1865)	18 July 1854	19 July 1854	1 day	Moderate	Rivas; PMod	1853	Queen; Isabella II (1843–1868)	
	Captain General; Baldomero Espartero; Duke of la Victoria and Morella (1793–1879)	19 July 1854	28 November 1854	1 year, 361 days	Progressive	Espartero III; PProg	1853	Queen; Isabella II (1843–1868)	
	Captain General; Baldomero Espartero; Duke of la Victoria and Morella (1793–1879)	19 July 1854	28 November 1854	1 year, 361 days	Progressive	Espartero III; PProg	1854	Queen; Isabella II (1843–1868)	
	Captain General; Baldomero Espartero; Duke of la Victoria and Morella (1793–1879)	28 November 1854	14 July 1856	1 year, 361 days	Progressive	Espartero IV; PProg	1854	Queen; Isabella II (1843–1868)	
	Captain General; Leopoldo O'Donnell; Count of Lucena (1809–1867)	14 July 1856	12 October 1856	90 days	Liberal Union	O'Donnell I UL	1854	Queen; Isabella II (1843–1868)	
	Captain General; Ramón María Narváez; Duke of Valencia (1800–1868)	12 October 1856	15 October 1857	1 year, 3 days	Moderate	Narváez V PMod	1854	Queen; Isabella II (1843–1868)	
	Captain General; Ramón María Narváez; Duke of Valencia (1800–1868)	12 October 1856	15 October 1857	1 year, 3 days	Moderate	Narváez V PMod	1857	Queen; Isabella II (1843–1868)	
	Captain General; Francisco Armero Peñaranda (1804–1866)	15 October 1857	14 January 1858	91 days	Moderate	Peñaranda; PMod	1857	Queen; Isabella II (1843–1868)	
	Francisco Javier de Istúriz (1790–1871)	14 January 1858	30 June 1858	167 days	Moderate	Istúriz III; PMod	1857	Queen; Isabella II (1843–1868)	
	Captain General; Leopoldo O'Donnell; Count of Lucena (1809–1867)	30 June 1858	7 November 1859	1 year, 130 days	Liberal Union	O'Donnell II; UL	1857	Queen; Isabella II (1843–1868)	
	Captain General; Leopoldo O'Donnell; Count of Lucena (1809–1867)	30 June 1858	7 November 1859	1 year, 130 days	Liberal Union	O'Donnell II; UL	1858	Queen; Isabella II (1843–1868)	
	Saturnino Calderón Collantes (interim) (1799–1864)	7 November 1859	30 April 1860	175 days	Liberal Union	Calderón (interim); UL	1858	Queen; Isabella II (1843–1868)	
	Captain General; Leopoldo O'Donnell; Duke of Tetuán (1809–1867)	30 April 1860	17 January 1863	2 years, 306 days	Liberal Union	O'Donnell II; UL	1858	Queen; Isabella II (1843–1868)	
	Captain General; Leopoldo O'Donnell; Duke of Tetuán (1809–1867)	17 January 1863	2 March 1863	2 years, 306 days	Liberal Union	O'Donnell III; UL	1858	Queen; Isabella II (1843–1868)	
	Manuel Pando; 2nd Marquis of Miraflores (1792–1872)	2 March 1863	17 January 1864	321 days	Moderate	Miraflores II; PMod	1858	Queen; Isabella II (1843–1868)	
	Manuel Pando; 2nd Marquis of Miraflores (1792–1872)	2 March 1863	17 January 1864	321 days	Moderate	Miraflores II; PMod	1863	Queen; Isabella II (1843–1868)	
	Lorenzo Arrazola (1795–1873)	17 January 1864	1 March 1864	44 days	Moderate	Arrazola; PMod	1863	Queen; Isabella II (1843–1868)	
	Alejandro Mon (1801–1883)	1 March 1864	16 September 1864	199 days	Moderate	Mon; PMod	1863	Queen; Isabella II (1843–1868)	
	Captain General; Ramón María Narváez; Duke of Valencia (1800–1868)	16 September 1864	21 June 1865	278 days	Moderate	Narváez VI; PMod	1863	Queen; Isabella II (1843–1868)	
	Captain General; Ramón María Narváez; Duke of Valencia (1800–1868)	16 September 1864	21 June 1865	278 days	Moderate	Narváez VI; PMod	1864	Queen; Isabella II (1843–1868)	
	Captain General; Leopoldo O'Donnell; Duke of Tetuán (1809–1867)	21 June 1865	10 July 1866	1 year, 19 days	Liberal Union	O'Donnell IV; UL	1864	Queen; Isabella II (1843–1868)	
	Captain General; Leopoldo O'Donnell; Duke of Tetuán (1809–1867)	21 June 1865	10 July 1866	1 year, 19 days	Liberal Union	O'Donnell IV; UL	1865	Queen; Isabella II (1843–1868)	
	Captain General; Ramón María Narváez; Duke of Valencia (1800–1868)	10 July 1866	23 April 1868 #	1 year, 288 days	Moderate	Narváez VII; PMod	1865	Queen; Isabella II (1843–1868)	
	Captain General; Ramón María Narváez; Duke of Valencia (1800–1868)	10 July 1866	23 April 1868 #	1 year, 288 days	Moderate	Narváez VII; PMod	1867	Queen; Isabella II (1843–1868)	
	Luis González Bravo (1811–1871)	23 April 1868	19 September 1868	149 days	Moderate	González Bravo II; PMod	1867	Queen; Isabella II (1843–1868)	
	Captain General; José Gutiérrez de la Concha; Marquis of Havana (1809–1895)	19 September 1868	30 September 1868 (Note: On 30 September 1868, Queen Isabella II went into exile as a result of the Glorious Revolution and the Battle of Alcolea.)	11 days	Moderate	Havana; PMod	1867	Queen; Isabella II (1843–1868)	

=== Democratic Sexennium and First Republic (1868–1874) ===
Governments:

- Constitutional
- Radical
- Republican
- Federal Republican
- Unitary Republican
- Constitutional
- Mixed coalition

Portrait	Name (Birth–Death)	Term of office			Party	Government Composition	Election	Head of State (Tenure)	Ref.
Portrait	Name (Birth–Death)	Took office	Left office	Duration	Party	Government Composition	Election	Head of State (Tenure)	Ref.
	Captain General; Francisco Serrano; Duke of la Torre (1810–1885)	3 October 1868	25 February 1869	258 days	Liberal Union	Serrano I UL–PProg	N/A	President/ Regent (Note: President of the Provisional Government (1868–1869), President of the Executive Power (1869), Regent of the Realm (1869–1871).); Francisco; Serrano (1868–1871)	
	Captain General; Francisco Serrano; Duke of la Torre (1810–1885)	3 October 1868	25 February 1869	258 days	Liberal Union	Serrano I UL–PProg	1869	President/ Regent; Francisco; Serrano (1868–1871)	
	Captain General; Francisco Serrano; Duke of la Torre (1810–1885)	25 February 1869	18 June 1869	258 days	Liberal Union	Serrano II; UL–PProg	1869	President/ Regent; Francisco; Serrano (1868–1871)	
	Captain General; Juan Prim; Marquis of los Castillejos (1814–1870)	18 June 1869	25 August 1869	68 days	Progressive	Prim; PProg–UL	1869	President/ Regent; Francisco; Serrano (1868–1871)	
During this interval, Minister of the Navy Juan Bautista Topete served as acting officeholder. (Note: Juan Prim was the de jure officeholder from 18 June 1869 to 30 December 1870. As a result of a travel to France, Minister of the Navy Juan Bautista Topete took on the ordinary discharge of duties from 26 August to 21 September 1869.)						Prim; PProg–UL	1869	President/ Regent; Francisco; Serrano (1868–1871)	
	Captain General; Juan Prim; Marquis of los Castillejos (1814–1870)	21 September 1869	27 December 1870 X	1 year, 97 days	Progressive	Prim; PProg–UL	1869	President/ Regent; Francisco; Serrano (1868–1871)	
	Admiral; Juan Bautista Topete (interim) (1821–1885)	27 December 1870	4 January 1871	8 days	Liberal Union	Topete (interim); PProg–UL	1869	President/ Regent; Francisco; Serrano (1868–1871)	
	Admiral; Juan Bautista Topete (interim) (1821–1885)	27 December 1870	4 January 1871	8 days	Liberal Union	Topete (interim); PProg–UL	1869	King; Amadeo I (1871–1873)	
	Captain General; Francisco Serrano; Duke of la Torre (1810–1885)	4 January 1871	24 July 1871	201 days	Liberal Union	Serrano III; UL–PProg	1869	King; Amadeo I (1871–1873)	
	Captain General; Francisco Serrano; Duke of la Torre (1810–1885)	4 January 1871	24 July 1871	201 days	Liberal Union	Serrano III; UL–PProg	1871	King; Amadeo I (1871–1873)	
	Manuel Ruiz Zorrilla (1833–1895)	24 July 1871	5 October 1871	73 days	Radical	Ruiz Zorrilla I PR–PProg	1871	King; Amadeo I (1871–1873)	
	Counter Admiral; José Malcampo (1828–1880)	5 October 1871	21 December 1871	77 days	Constitutional	Malcampo; PC	1871	King; Amadeo I (1871–1873)	
	Práxedes Mateo Sagasta (1825–1903)	21 December 1871	20 February 1872	157 days	Constitutional	Sagasta I PC	1871	King; Amadeo I (1871–1873)	
	Práxedes Mateo Sagasta (1825–1903)	20 February 1872	26 May 1872	157 days	Constitutional	Sagasta II; PC	1871	King; Amadeo I (1871–1873)	
	Práxedes Mateo Sagasta (1825–1903)	20 February 1872	26 May 1872	157 days	Constitutional	Sagasta II; PC	Apr. 1872	King; Amadeo I (1871–1873)	
	Captain General; Francisco Serrano; Duke of la Torre (1810–1885)	26 May 1872	13 June 1872	18 days	Constitutional	Serrano IV; PC	Apr. 1872	King; Amadeo I (1871–1873)	
	Manuel Ruiz Zorrilla (1833–1895)	13 June 1872	11 February 1873	244 days	Radical	Ruiz Zorrilla II; PR	Apr. 1872	King; Amadeo I (1871–1873)	
	Manuel Ruiz Zorrilla (1833–1895)	13 June 1872	11 February 1873	244 days	Radical	Ruiz Zorrilla II; PR	Aug. 1872	King; Amadeo I (1871–1873)	
	Estanislao Figueras (1819–1882)	12 February 1873	24 February 1873	119 days	Republican	Figueras I PRDF–PR–RU	Aug. 1872	President of the Executive; Power (Note: During the First Spanish Republic, the offices of the heads of state and government were merged until Francisco Serrano split them again in February 1874.) (1873–1874)	
	Estanislao Figueras (1819–1882)	24 February 1873	11 June 1873	119 days	Republican	Figueras II; PRDF–RU	Aug. 1872	President of the Executive; Power (1873–1874)	
	Estanislao Figueras (1819–1882)	24 February 1873	11 June 1873	119 days	Republican	Figueras II; PRDF–RU	1873	President of the Executive; Power (1873–1874)	
	Francisco Pi y Margall (1824–1901)	11 June 1873	18 July 1873	37 days	Republican	Pi y Margall; PRDF– RU from Jun 1873	1873	President of the Executive; Power (1873–1874)	
	Nicolás Salmerón (1838–1908)	18 July 1873	7 September 1873	51 days	Republican	Salmerón; PRDF–RU	1873	President of the Executive; Power (1873–1874)	
	Emilio Castelar (1832–1899)	7 September 1873	3 January 1874	118 days	Republican	Castelar; RU	1873	President of the Executive; Power (1873–1874)	
	Captain General; Francisco Serrano; Duke of la Torre (1810–1885)	3 January 1874	26 February 1874	54 days	Constitutional	Serrano V PC–RU– PR from Jan 1874	N/A	President of the Executive; Power (1873–1874)	
	Juan de Zavala; Marquis of Sierra Bullones (1804–1879)	26 February 1874	13 May 1874	123 days	Constitutional	Zavala I PC–RU–PR	N/A	President of the Executive; Power (1873–1874)	
	Juan de Zavala; Marquis of Sierra Bullones (1804–1879)	13 May 1874	29 June 1874 (Note: Despite being appointed as Commander of the Northern Army in the Third Carlist War on 29 June 1874, Juan de Zavala remained the de jure officeholder until 3 September.)	123 days	Constitutional	Zavala II; PC	N/A	President of the Executive; Power (1873–1874)	
During this interval, Minister of Governance Práxedes Mateo Sagasta served as acting officeholder.						Zavala II; PC	N/A	President of the Executive; Power (1873–1874)	
	Práxedes Mateo Sagasta (1825–1903)	3 September 1874	31 December 1874	119 days	Constitutional	Sagasta III; PC	N/A	President of the Executive; Power (1873–1874)	

=== Bourbon Restoration in Spain (1874–1931) ===
Governments:

- Conservative
- Liberal
- Dynastic Left
- Liberal Unity
- Democratic/Liberal Democratic
- Maurist
- Military
- Civil Directory
- Mixed coalition

Portrait	Name (Birth–Death)	Term of office			Party	Government Composition	Election	Monarch (Reign)	Ref.
Portrait	Name (Birth–Death)	Took office	Left office	Duration	Party	Government Composition	Election	Monarch (Reign)	Ref.
	Antonio Cánovas del Castillo (1828–1897)	31 December 1874	12 September 1875	255 days	Conservative	Cánovas I PLC	N/A	President of the Regency Ministry (Note: Antonio Cánovas del Castillo held the office until Alfonso XII's return to Spain on 9 January 1875.) (1874–1875)	
	Antonio Cánovas del Castillo (1828–1897)	31 December 1874	12 September 1875	255 days	Conservative	Cánovas I PLC	N/A	King; Alfonso XII (1874–1885)	
	Lieutenant General; Joaquín Jovellar (1819–1892)	12 September 1875	2 December 1875	81 days	Conservative	Jovellar; PLC	N/A	King; Alfonso XII (1874–1885)	
	Antonio Cánovas del Castillo (1828–1897)	2 December 1875	7 March 1879	3 years, 95 days	Conservative	Cánovas II; PLC	N/A	King; Alfonso XII (1874–1885)	
	Antonio Cánovas del Castillo (1828–1897)	2 December 1875	7 March 1879	3 years, 95 days	Conservative	Cánovas II; PLC	1876	King; Alfonso XII (1874–1885)	
	Captain General; Arsenio Martínez Campos (1831–1900)	7 March 1879	9 December 1879	277 days	Conservative	Martínez Campos; PLC	1876	King; Alfonso XII (1874–1885)	
	Captain General; Arsenio Martínez Campos (1831–1900)	7 March 1879	9 December 1879	277 days	Conservative	Martínez Campos; PLC	1879	King; Alfonso XII (1874–1885)	
	Antonio Cánovas del Castillo (1828–1897)	9 December 1879	8 February 1881	1 year, 61 days	Conservative	Cánovas III; PLC	1879	King; Alfonso XII (1874–1885)	
	Práxedes Mateo Sagasta (1825–1903)	8 February 1881	13 October 1883	2 years, 247 days	Liberal	Sagasta IV; PLF	1879	King; Alfonso XII (1874–1885)	
	Práxedes Mateo Sagasta (1825–1903)	8 February 1881	13 October 1883	2 years, 247 days	Liberal	Sagasta IV; PLF	1881	King; Alfonso XII (1874–1885)	
	José Posada Herrera (1814–1885)	13 October 1883	18 January 1884	97 days	Dynastic Left	Posada Herrera; ID	1881	King; Alfonso XII (1874–1885)	
	Antonio Cánovas del Castillo (1828–1897)	18 January 1884	27 November 1885	1 year, 313 days	Conservative	Cánovas IV; PLC	1881	King; Alfonso XII (1874–1885)	
	Antonio Cánovas del Castillo (1828–1897)	18 January 1884	27 November 1885	1 year, 313 days	Conservative	Cánovas IV; PLC	1884	King; Alfonso XII (1874–1885)	
	Antonio Cánovas del Castillo (1828–1897)	18 January 1884	27 November 1885	1 year, 313 days	Conservative	Cánovas IV; PLC	1884	Queen Regent; Maria Christina of Austria (1885–1902)	
	Práxedes Mateo Sagasta (1825–1903)	27 November 1885	11 December 1888	4 years, 220 days	Liberal	Sagasta V PL	1884	Queen Regent; Maria Christina of Austria (1885–1902)	
	Práxedes Mateo Sagasta (1825–1903)	27 November 1885	11 December 1888	4 years, 220 days	Liberal	Sagasta V PL	1886	Queen Regent; Maria Christina of Austria (1885–1902)	
	Práxedes Mateo Sagasta (1825–1903)	11 December 1888	21 January 1890	4 years, 220 days	Liberal	Sagasta VI; PL	1886	Queen Regent; Maria Christina of Austria (1885–1902)	
	Práxedes Mateo Sagasta (1825–1903)	21 January 1890	5 July 1890	4 years, 220 days	Liberal	Sagasta VII; PL	1886	Queen Regent; Maria Christina of Austria (1885–1902)	
	Antonio Cánovas del Castillo (1828–1897)	5 July 1890	23 November 1891	2 years, 159 days	Conservative	Cánovas V PLC	1886	Queen Regent; Maria Christina of Austria (1885–1902)	
	Antonio Cánovas del Castillo (1828–1897)	5 July 1890	23 November 1891	2 years, 159 days	Conservative	Cánovas V PLC	1891	Queen Regent; Maria Christina of Austria (1885–1902)	
	Antonio Cánovas del Castillo (1828–1897)	23 November 1891	11 December 1892	2 years, 159 days	Conservative	Cánovas VI; PLC	1891	Queen Regent; Maria Christina of Austria (1885–1902)	
	Práxedes Mateo Sagasta (1825–1903)	11 December 1892	23 March 1895	2 years, 102 days	Liberal	Sagasta VIII; PL	1891	Queen Regent; Maria Christina of Austria (1885–1902)	
	Práxedes Mateo Sagasta (1825–1903)	11 December 1892	23 March 1895	2 years, 102 days	Liberal	Sagasta VIII; PL	1893	Queen Regent; Maria Christina of Austria (1885–1902)	
	Antonio Cánovas del Castillo (1828–1897)	23 March 1895	8 August 1897 X	2 years, 138 days	Conservative	Cánovas VII; PLC	1893	Queen Regent; Maria Christina of Austria (1885–1902)	
	Antonio Cánovas del Castillo (1828–1897)	23 March 1895	8 August 1897 X	2 years, 138 days	Conservative	Cánovas VII; PLC	1896	Queen Regent; Maria Christina of Austria (1885–1902)	
During this interval, Minister of War Marcelo Azcárraga served as acting officeholder.						Cánovas VII; PLC	1896	Queen Regent; Maria Christina of Austria (1885–1902)	
	Lieutenant General; Marcelo Azcárraga (1832–1915)	21 August 1897	4 October 1897	44 days	Conservative	Azcárraga I PLC	1896	Queen Regent; Maria Christina of Austria (1885–1902)	
	Práxedes Mateo Sagasta (1825–1903)	4 October 1897	4 March 1899	1 year, 151 days	Liberal	Sagasta IX; PL	1896	Queen Regent; Maria Christina of Austria (1885–1902)	
	Práxedes Mateo Sagasta (1825–1903)	4 October 1897	4 March 1899	1 year, 151 days	Liberal	Sagasta IX; PL	1898	Queen Regent; Maria Christina of Austria (1885–1902)	
	Francisco Silvela (1843–1905)	4 March 1899	23 October 1900	1 year, 233 days	Conservative; Union	Silvela I PLC	1898	Queen Regent; Maria Christina of Austria (1885–1902)	
	Francisco Silvela (1843–1905)	4 March 1899	23 October 1900	1 year, 233 days	Conservative; Union	Silvela I PLC	1899	Queen Regent; Maria Christina of Austria (1885–1902)	
	Lieutenant General; Marcelo Azcárraga (1832–1915)	23 October 1900	6 March 1901	134 days	Conservative	Azcárraga II; PLC	1899	Queen Regent; Maria Christina of Austria (1885–1902)	
	Práxedes Mateo Sagasta (1825–1903)	6 March 1901	19 March 1902	1 year, 275 days	Liberal	Sagasta X PL	1899	Queen Regent; Maria Christina of Austria (1885–1902)	
	Práxedes Mateo Sagasta (1825–1903)	6 March 1901	19 March 1902	1 year, 275 days	Liberal	Sagasta X PL	1901	Queen Regent; Maria Christina of Austria (1885–1902)	
	Práxedes Mateo Sagasta (1825–1903)	19 March 1902	15 November 1902	1 year, 275 days	Liberal	Sagasta XI; PL	1901	Queen Regent; Maria Christina of Austria (1885–1902)	
	Práxedes Mateo Sagasta (1825–1903)	19 March 1902	15 November 1902	1 year, 275 days	Liberal	Sagasta XI; PL	1901	King; Alfonso XIII (1902–1931)	
	Práxedes Mateo Sagasta (1825–1903)	15 November 1902	6 December 1902	1 year, 275 days	Liberal	Sagasta XII; PL	1901	King; Alfonso XIII (1902–1931)	
	Francisco Silvela (1843–1905)	6 December 1902	20 July 1903	226 days	Conservative	Silvela II; PLC	1901	King; Alfonso XIII (1902–1931)	
	Francisco Silvela (1843–1905)	6 December 1902	20 July 1903	226 days	Conservative	Silvela II; PLC	1903	King; Alfonso XIII (1902–1931)	
	Raimundo Fernández; Villaverde; Marquis of Pozo Rubio (1848–1905)	20 July 1903	5 December 1903	138 days	Conservative	Villaverde I PLC	1903	King; Alfonso XIII (1902–1931)	
	Antonio Maura (1853–1925)	5 December 1903	16 December 1904	1 year, 11 days	Conservative	Maura I PLC	1903	King; Alfonso XIII (1902–1931)	
	Lieutenant General; Marcelo Azcárraga (1832–1915)	16 December 1904	27 January 1905	42 days	Conservative	Azcárraga III; PLC	1903	King; Alfonso XIII (1902–1931)	
	Raimundo Fernández; Villaverde; Marquis of Pozo Rubio (1848–1905)	27 January 1905	23 June 1905	147 days	Conservative (Villaverdist)	Villaverde II; PLC	1903	King; Alfonso XIII (1902–1931)	
	Eugenio Montero Ríos (1832–1914)	23 June 1905	31 October 1905	161 days	Liberal	Montero Ríos I PL	1903	King; Alfonso XIII (1902–1931)	
	Eugenio Montero Ríos (1832–1914)	23 June 1905	31 October 1905	161 days	Liberal	Montero Ríos I PL	1905	King; Alfonso XIII (1902–1931)	
	Eugenio Montero Ríos (1832–1914)	31 October 1905	1 December 1905	161 days	Liberal	Montero Ríos II; PL	1905	King; Alfonso XIII (1902–1931)	
	Segismundo Moret (1833–1913)	1 December 1905	6 July 1906	217 days	Liberal	Moret I PL	1905	King; Alfonso XIII (1902–1931)	
	Captain General; José López Domínguez (1829–1911)	6 July 1906	30 November 1906	147 days	Liberal	López Dominguez; PL	1905	King; Alfonso XIII (1902–1931)	
	Segismundo Moret (1833–1913)	30 November 1906	4 December 1906	4 days	Liberal	Moret II; PL	1905	King; Alfonso XIII (1902–1931)	
	Antonio Aguilar y Correa; 8th Marquis of la Vega de Armijo (1824–1908)	4 December 1906	25 January 1907	52 days	Liberal	Vega de Armijo; PL	1905	King; Alfonso XIII (1902–1931)	
	Antonio Maura (1853–1925)	25 January 1907	21 October 1909	2 years, 269 days	Conservative	Maura II; PLC	1905	King; Alfonso XIII (1902–1931)	
	Antonio Maura (1853–1925)	25 January 1907	21 October 1909	2 years, 269 days	Conservative	Maura II; PLC	1907	King; Alfonso XIII (1902–1931)	
	Segismundo Moret (1833–1913)	21 October 1909	9 February 1910	111 days	Liberal	Moret III; PL	1907	King; Alfonso XIII (1902–1931)	
	José Canalejas (1854–1912)	9 February 1910	2 January 1911	2 years, 277 days	Democratic	Canalejas I PDM until Jun 1910	1907	King; Alfonso XIII (1902–1931)	
	José Canalejas (1854–1912)	9 February 1910	2 January 1911	2 years, 277 days	Liberal	PL from Jun 1910	1910	King; Alfonso XIII (1902–1931)	
	José Canalejas (1854–1912)	2 January 1911	3 April 1911	2 years, 277 days	Liberal	Canalejas II; PL	1910	King; Alfonso XIII (1902–1931)	
	José Canalejas (1854–1912)	3 April 1911	12 November 1912 X	2 years, 277 days	Liberal	Canalejas III; PL	1910	King; Alfonso XIII (1902–1931)	
During this interval, Minister of State Manuel García Prieto served as acting officeholder.						Canalejas III; PL	1910	King; Alfonso XIII (1902–1931)	
	Álvaro de Figueroa; Count of Romanones (1863–1950)	14 November 1912	31 December 1912	347 days	Liberal (Romanonist)	Romanones I PL	1910	King; Alfonso XIII (1902–1931)	
	Álvaro de Figueroa; Count of Romanones (1863–1950)	31 December 1912	27 October 1913	347 days	Liberal (Romanonist)	Romanones II; PL	1910	King; Alfonso XIII (1902–1931)	
	Eduardo Dato (1856–1921)	27 October 1913	9 December 1915	2 years, 43 days	Conservative (Datist)	Dato I PLC	1910	King; Alfonso XIII (1902–1931)	
	Eduardo Dato (1856–1921)	27 October 1913	9 December 1915	2 years, 43 days	Conservative (Datist)	Dato I PLC	1914	King; Alfonso XIII (1902–1931)	
	Álvaro de Figueroa; Count of Romanones (1863–1950)	9 December 1915	19 April 1917	1 year, 131 days	Liberal (Romanonist)	Romanones III; PL–LD	1914	King; Alfonso XIII (1902–1931)	
	Álvaro de Figueroa; Count of Romanones (1863–1950)	9 December 1915	19 April 1917	1 year, 131 days	Liberal (Romanonist)	Romanones III; PL–LD	1916	King; Alfonso XIII (1902–1931)	
	Manuel García Prieto; Marquis of Alhucemas (1859–1938)	19 April 1917	11 June 1917	53 days	Liberal; Democrats	García Prieto I LD–IL	1916	King; Alfonso XIII (1902–1931)	
	Eduardo Dato (1856–1921)	11 June 1917	3 November 1917	145 days	Conservative (Datist)	Dato II; PLC	1916	King; Alfonso XIII (1902–1931)	
	Manuel García Prieto; Marquis of Alhucemas (1859–1938)	3 November 1917	22 March 1918	139 days	Liberal; Democrats	García Prieto II; LD–L–PM–CC– LRC until Mar 1918	1916	King; Alfonso XIII (1902–1931)	
	Antonio Maura (1853–1925)	22 March 1918	9 November 1918	232 days	Maurist	Maura III; PM–PLC–LD–L–LRC– IL until Oct 1918	1918	King; Alfonso XIII (1902–1931)	
	Manuel García Prieto; Marquis of Alhucemas (1859–1938)	9 November 1918	5 December 1918	26 days	Liberal; Democrats	García Prieto III; LD–L–IL	1918	King; Alfonso XIII (1902–1931)	
	Álvaro de Figueroa; Count of Romanones (1863–1950)	5 December 1918	14 April 1919	130 days	Liberal (Romanonist)	Romanones IV; L	1918	King; Alfonso XIII (1902–1931)	
	Antonio Maura (1853–1925)	14 April 1919	20 July 1919	97 days	Maurist	Maura IV; PM–CC	1918	King; Alfonso XIII (1902–1931)	
	Joaquín Sánchez de Toca (1852–1942)	20 July 1919	12 December 1919	145 days	Conservative (Datist)	Sánchez de Toca; PLC	1918	King; Alfonso XIII (1902–1931)	
	Joaquín Sánchez de Toca (1852–1942)	20 July 1919	12 December 1919	145 days	Conservative (Datist)	Sánchez de Toca; PLC	1919	King; Alfonso XIII (1902–1931)	
	Manuel Allendesalazar (1856–1923)	12 December 1919	5 May 1920	145 days	Conservative	Allendesalazar I PLC–LD–L–IL	1919	King; Alfonso XIII (1902–1931)	
	Eduardo Dato (1856–1921)	5 May 1920	8 March 1921 X	307 days	Conservative (Datist)	Dato III; PLC	1919	King; Alfonso XIII (1902–1931)	
	Eduardo Dato (1856–1921)	5 May 1920	8 March 1921 X	307 days	Conservative (Datist)	Dato III; PLC	1920	King; Alfonso XIII (1902–1931)	
During this interval, Minister of Governance Gabino Bugallal served as acting officeholder.						Dato III; PLC	1920	King; Alfonso XIII (1902–1931)	
	Manuel Allendesalazar (1856–1923)	13 March 1921	14 August 1921	154 days	Conservative	Allendesalazar II; PLC–CC	1920	King; Alfonso XIII (1902–1931)	
	Antonio Maura (1853–1925)	14 August 1921	8 March 1922	206 days	Maurist	Maura V PM–L–CC–PLC–LRC	1920	King; Alfonso XIII (1902–1931)	
	José Sánchez-Guerra (1859–1935)	8 March 1922	7 December 1922	274 days	Conservative	Sánchez-Guerra; PLC– PM–LRC until Apr 1922	1920	King; Alfonso XIII (1902–1931)	
	Manuel García Prieto; Marquis of Alhucemas (1859–1938)	7 December 1922	15 September 1923	282 days	Liberal; Democrats	García Prieto IV; LD–L–IL– PR until Apr 1923	1920	King; Alfonso XIII (1902–1931)	
	Manuel García Prieto; Marquis of Alhucemas (1859–1938)	7 December 1922	15 September 1923	282 days	Liberal; Democrats	García Prieto IV; LD–L–IL– PR until Apr 1923	1923	King; Alfonso XIII (1902–1931)	
	Lieutenant General; Miguel Primo de Rivera; 2nd Marquis of Estella (1870–1930)	15 September 1923	3 December 1925	6 years, 137 days	Military	Military Directory; Mil.	N/A	King; Alfonso XIII (1902–1931)	
	Lieutenant General; Miguel Primo de Rivera; 2nd Marquis of Estella (1870–1930)	3 December 1925	30 January 1930	6 years, 137 days	Patriotic; Union	Civil Directory; UP–Mil.	N/A	King; Alfonso XIII (1902–1931)	
	Lieutenant General; Dámaso Berenguer; Count of Xauen (1873–1953)	30 January 1930	18 February 1931	1 year, 19 days	Military	Berenguer; Mil.–Ind.	N/A	King; Alfonso XIII (1902–1931)	
	Captain General; Juan Bautista Aznar-Cabañas (1860–1933)	18 February 1931	14 April 1931	55 days	Military	Aznar-Cabañas; Mil.–Ind.	N/A	King; Alfonso XIII (1902–1931)	

=== Second Spanish Republic (1931–1939) ===
Governments:

- Provisional
- Reformist
- Radical
- Radical–Cedist
- Centrist
- Popular Front
- War cabinet
- Mixed coalition

Portrait	Name (Birth–Death)	Term of office			Party	Government Composition	Election	President (Tenure)	Ref.
Portrait	Name (Birth–Death)	Took office	Left office	Duration	Party	Government Composition	Election	President (Tenure)	Ref.
	Niceto Alcalá-Zamora (1877–1949)	14 April 1931	14 October 1931	183 days	DLR / PRP	Alcalá-Zamora; PSOE–PRR–PRRS–DLR/PRP– AR–ORGA–PCR	N/A	President of the Provisional; Government (1931)	
	Niceto Alcalá-Zamora (1877–1949)	14 April 1931	14 October 1931	183 days	DLR / PRP	Alcalá-Zamora; PSOE–PRR–PRRS–DLR/PRP– AR–ORGA–PCR	1931	President of the Provisional; Government (1931)	
	Manuel Azaña (1880–1940)	14 October 1931	11 December 1931	1 year, 333 days	AR	Azaña I PSOE–PRR–PRRS–AR–ORGA–PCR	1931	President of the Provisional; Government (1931)	
	Manuel Azaña (1880–1940)	16 December 1931	12 June 1933	1 year, 333 days	AR	Azaña II; PSOE–PRRS–AR–ERC–ORGA/PRG	1931	President; Niceto; Alcalá-Zamora (1931–1936)	
	Manuel Azaña (1880–1940)	12 June 1933	12 September 1933	1 year, 333 days	AR	Azaña III; PSOE–PRRS–AR–ERC–PRG–PRDF	1931	President; Niceto; Alcalá-Zamora (1931–1936)	
	Alejandro Lerroux (1864–1949)	12 September 1933	8 October 1933	26 days	PRR	Lerroux I PRR–PRRS–ERC–AR–ORGA–IRS	1931	President; Niceto; Alcalá-Zamora (1931–1936)	
	Diego Martínez Barrio (1883–1962)	8 October 1933	16 December 1933	69 days	PRR	Martínez Barrio I PRR–PRRS–ERC–AR–ORGA–PRP–IRS	1931	President; Niceto; Alcalá-Zamora (1931–1936)	
	Alejandro Lerroux (1864–1949)	16 December 1933	3 March 1934	133 days	PRR	Lerroux II; PRR–PAE–PRP–PRLD–PRG	1933	President; Niceto; Alcalá-Zamora (1931–1936)	
	Alejandro Lerroux (1864–1949)	3 March 1934	28 April 1934	133 days	PRR	Lerroux III; PRR–PAE–PRP–PRLD–PRG	1933	President; Niceto; Alcalá-Zamora (1931–1936)	
	Ricardo Samper (1881–1938)	28 April 1934	4 October 1934	159 days	PRR	Samper; PRR–PAE–PRP–PRLD–PRG	1933	President; Niceto; Alcalá-Zamora (1931–1936)	
	Alejandro Lerroux (1864–1949)	4 October 1934	3 April 1935	356 days	PRR	Lerroux IV; PRR–CEDA–PAE–PRLD	1933	President; Niceto; Alcalá-Zamora (1931–1936)	
	Alejandro Lerroux (1864–1949)	3 April 1935	6 May 1935	356 days	PRR	Lerroux V PRR–PRP–Ind.	1933	President; Niceto; Alcalá-Zamora (1931–1936)	
	Alejandro Lerroux (1864–1949)	6 May 1935	25 September 1935	356 days	PRR	Lerroux VI; CEDA–PRR–PAE–PRLD	1933	President; Niceto; Alcalá-Zamora (1931–1936)	
	Joaquín Chapaprieta (1871–1951)	25 September 1935	29 October 1935	80 days	Independent	Chapaprieta I CEDA–PRR–PAE–LC	1933	President; Niceto; Alcalá-Zamora (1931–1936)	
	Joaquín Chapaprieta (1871–1951)	29 October 1935	14 December 1935	80 days	Independent	Chapaprieta II; CEDA–PRR–PAE–LC	1933	President; Niceto; Alcalá-Zamora (1931–1936)	
	Manuel Portela Valladares (1867–1952)	14 December 1935	30 December 1935	67 days	Independent	Portela I Ind.–PRR–PAE–LC–PRP–PRLD	1933	President; Niceto; Alcalá-Zamora (1931–1936)	
	Manuel Portela Valladares (1867–1952)	30 December 1935	19 February 1936	67 days	PCD	Portela II; PCD–PRP–Ind.	1933	President; Niceto; Alcalá-Zamora (1931–1936)	
	Manuel Azaña (1880–1940)	19 February 1936	10 May 1936	81 days	IR	Azaña IV; IR–UR	1936	President; Niceto; Alcalá-Zamora (1931–1936)	
	Augusto Barcía Trelles (interim) (1881–1961)	10 May 1936	13 May 1936	3 days	IR	Barcía Trelles (interim); IR–UR	1936	President; Manuel Azaña (1936–1939)	
	Santiago Casares Quiroga (1884–1950)	13 May 1936	18 July 1936	66 days	IR	Casares Quiroga; IR–UR–ERC	1936	President; Manuel Azaña (1936–1939)	
	Diego Martínez Barrio (1883–1962)	18 July 1936	19 July 1936	1 day	UR	Martínez Barrio II; UR–PNR–IR–ERC	1936	President; Manuel Azaña (1936–1939)	
	José Giral (1879–1962)	19 July 1936	4 September 1936	47 days	IR	Giral; IR–UR–ERC	1936	President; Manuel Azaña (1936–1939)	
	Francisco Largo Caballero (1869–1946)	4 September 1936	4 November 1936	255 days	PSOE	Largo Caballero I PSOE–IR–PCE–UR–ERC–PNV	1936	President; Manuel Azaña (1936–1939)	
	Francisco Largo Caballero (1869–1946)	4 November 1936	17 May 1937	255 days	PSOE	Largo Caballero II; PSOE–CNT–IR–PCE–UR–ERC–PNV	1936	President; Manuel Azaña (1936–1939)	
	Juan Negrín (1892–1956)	17 May 1937	5 April 1938	1 year, 292 days	PSOE	Negrín I PSOE–IR–PCE–UR–ERC–PNV	1936	President; Manuel Azaña (1936–1939)	
	Juan Negrín (1892–1956)	5 April 1938	31 March 1939	1 year, 292 days	PSOE	Negrín II; PSOE–IR–UR–PCE–PNV–CNT– ERC until Aug 1938; PSUC–ANV from Aug 1938	1936	President; Manuel Azaña (1936–1939)	

=== Francoist Spain (1936–1975) ===
Governments:

- National Movement

Portrait	Name (Birth–Death)	Term of office			Party	Government Composition	Election	Head of State (Tenure)	Ref.
Portrait	Name (Birth–Death)	Took office	Left office	Duration	Party	Government Composition	Election	Head of State (Tenure)	Ref.
	Generalissimo; Francisco Franco (1892–1975)	30 January 1938 (Note: Position disputed with the Republican government from 30 January 1938 to the end of the Civil War on 1 April 1939.)	9 August 1939	35 years, 129 days	National; Movement (Military)	Franco I National Movement	N/A	Caudillo; Francisco; Franco (1936–1975)	
	Generalissimo; Francisco Franco (1892–1975)	9 August 1939	20 July 1945	35 years, 129 days	National; Movement (Military)	Franco II; National Movement	N/A	Caudillo; Francisco; Franco (1936–1975)	
	Generalissimo; Francisco Franco (1892–1975)	20 July 1945	19 July 1951	35 years, 129 days	National; Movement (Military)	Franco III; National Movement	N/A	Caudillo; Francisco; Franco (1936–1975)	
	Generalissimo; Francisco Franco (1892–1975)	19 July 1951	25 February 1957	35 years, 129 days	National; Movement (Military)	Franco IV; National Movement	N/A	Caudillo; Francisco; Franco (1936–1975)	
	Generalissimo; Francisco Franco (1892–1975)	25 February 1957	11 July 1962	35 years, 129 days	National; Movement (Military)	Franco V National Movement	N/A	Caudillo; Francisco; Franco (1936–1975)	
	Generalissimo; Francisco Franco (1892–1975)	11 July 1962	8 July 1965	35 years, 129 days	National; Movement (Military)	Franco VI; National Movement	N/A	Caudillo; Francisco; Franco (1936–1975)	
	Generalissimo; Francisco Franco (1892–1975)	8 July 1965	30 October 1969	35 years, 129 days	National; Movement (Military)	Franco VII; National Movement	N/A	Caudillo; Francisco; Franco (1936–1975)	
	Generalissimo; Francisco Franco (1892–1975)	30 October 1969	9 June 1973	35 years, 129 days	National; Movement (Military)	Franco VIII; National Movement	N/A	Caudillo; Francisco; Franco (1936–1975)	
	Admiral; Luis Carrero Blanco (1904–1973)	9 June 1973	20 December 1973 X	195 days	National; Movement (Military)	Carrero Blanco; National Movement	N/A	Caudillo; Francisco; Franco (1936–1975)	
During this interval, Deputy Prime Minister Torcuato Fernández-Miranda served as acting officeholder.						Carrero Blanco; National Movement	N/A	Caudillo; Francisco; Franco (1936–1975)	
	Carlos Arias Navarro (1908–1989)	31 December 1973	5 December 1975	1 year, 341 days	National; Movement (Nonpartisan)	Arias Navarro I National Movement	N/A	Caudillo; Francisco; Franco (1936–1975)	
	Carlos Arias Navarro (1908–1989)	31 December 1973	5 December 1975	1 year, 341 days	National; Movement (Nonpartisan)	Arias Navarro I National Movement	N/A	Regency Council (Note: Alejandro Rodríguez de Valcárcel, in his condition as president of the Council of the Realm, served as chairman of the Regency Council from Franco's death on 20 November to Juan Carlos I's enthronement two days later.) (1975)	

=== Kingdom of Spain (1975–present) ===
Governments:

- National Movement
- UCD
- PSOE
- PP
- Mixed coalition

Portrait	Name (Birth–Death)	Term of office			Party	Government Composition	Election	Monarch (Reign)	Ref.
Portrait	Name (Birth–Death)	Took office	Left office	Duration	Party	Government Composition	Election	Monarch (Reign)	Ref.
	Carlos Arias Navarro (1908–1989)	5 December 1975	1 July 1976	209 days	National; Movement (Nonpartisan)	Arias Navarro II; National Movement	N/A	King; Juan Carlos I (1975–2014)	
During this interval, First Deputy Prime Minister Fernando de Santiago served as acting officeholder.						Arias Navarro II; National Movement	N/A	King; Juan Carlos I (1975–2014)	
	Adolfo Suárez (1932–2014)	5 July 1976	17 June 1977	4 years, 236 days	National; Movement (UDPE)	Suárez I National Movement (Note: On 7 April 1977, the National Movement (including FET–JONS) was officially disbanded, with many cabinet members joining the nascent Union of the Democratic Centre (UCD) upon its formation in May 1977.)	N/A	King; Juan Carlos I (1975–2014)	
	Adolfo Suárez (1932–2014)	17 June 1977	2 April 1979	4 years, 236 days	UCD	Suárez II; UCD	1977	King; Juan Carlos I (1975–2014)	
	Adolfo Suárez (1932–2014)	2 April 1979	26 February 1981	4 years, 236 days	UCD	Suárez III; UCD	1979	King; Juan Carlos I (1975–2014)	
	Leopoldo Calvo-Sotelo (1926–2008)	26 February 1981	2 December 1982	1 year, 279 days	UCD	Calvo-Sotelo; UCD	1979	King; Juan Carlos I (1975–2014)	
	Felipe González (born 1942)	2 December 1982	24 July 1986	13 years, 155 days	PSOE	González I PSOE	1982	King; Juan Carlos I (1975–2014)	
	Felipe González (born 1942)	24 July 1986	6 December 1989	13 years, 155 days	PSOE	González II; PSOE	1986	King; Juan Carlos I (1975–2014)	
	Felipe González (born 1942)	6 December 1989	14 July 1993	13 years, 155 days	PSOE	González III; PSOE	1989	King; Juan Carlos I (1975–2014)	
	Felipe González (born 1942)	14 July 1993	5 May 1996	13 years, 155 days	PSOE	González IV; PSOE	1993	King; Juan Carlos I (1975–2014)	
	José María Aznar (born 1953)	5 May 1996	27 April 2000	7 years, 348 days	PP	Aznar I PP	1996	King; Juan Carlos I (1975–2014)	
	José María Aznar (born 1953)	27 April 2000	17 April 2004	7 years, 348 days	PP	Aznar II; PP	2000	King; Juan Carlos I (1975–2014)	
	José Luis Rodríguez Zapatero (born 1960)	17 April 2004	12 April 2008	7 years, 248 days	PSOE	Zapatero I PSOE	2004	King; Juan Carlos I (1975–2014)	
	José Luis Rodríguez Zapatero (born 1960)	12 April 2008	21 December 2011	7 years, 248 days	PSOE	Zapatero II; PSOE	2008	King; Juan Carlos I (1975–2014)	
	Mariano Rajoy (born 1955)	21 December 2011	31 October 2016	6 years, 162 days	PP	Rajoy I PP	2011	King; Juan Carlos I (1975–2014)	
	Mariano Rajoy (born 1955)	21 December 2011	31 October 2016	6 years, 162 days	PP	Rajoy I PP	2011	King; Felipe VI (2014–present)	
	Mariano Rajoy (born 1955)	21 December 2011	31 October 2016	6 years, 162 days	PP	Rajoy I PP	2015	King; Felipe VI (2014–present)	
	Mariano Rajoy (born 1955)	31 October 2016	1 June 2018	6 years, 162 days	PP	Rajoy II; PP	2016	King; Felipe VI (2014–present)	
	Pedro Sánchez (born 1972)	2 June 2018	8 January 2020	8 years, 141 days	PSOE	Sánchez I PSOE	2016	King; Felipe VI (2014–present)	
	Pedro Sánchez (born 1972)	2 June 2018	8 January 2020	8 years, 141 days	PSOE	Sánchez I PSOE	Apr. 2019	King; Felipe VI (2014–present)	
	Pedro Sánchez (born 1972)	8 January 2020	17 November 2023	8 years, 141 days	PSOE	Sánchez II; PSOE–UP/Sumar	Nov. 2019	King; Felipe VI (2014–present)	
	Pedro Sánchez (born 1972)	17 November 2023	Incumbent	8 years, 141 days	PSOE	Sánchez III; PSOE–Sumar	2023	King; Felipe VI (2014–present)	

== See also ==
- Secretary of State (Ancient Regime in Spain)
- Prime Minister of Spain
- List of prime ministers of Spain by length of tenure
- List of Spanish monarchs
- List of heads of state of Spain
- President of the Republic (Spain)
- List of Spanish regents
