= First government of Segismundo Moret =

1st government of Segismundo Moret
- Government of Spain
- 1905–1906
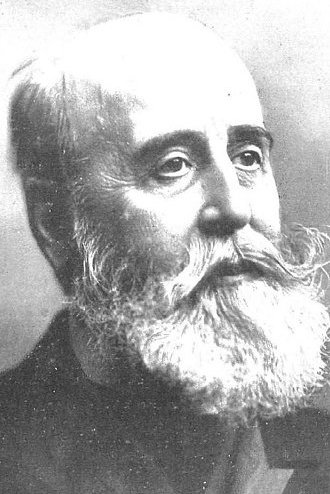
- Moret before 1909
- Date formed: 1 December 1905
- Date dissolved: 6 July 1906

People and organisations
- Monarch: Alfonso XIII
- Prime Minister: Segismundo Moret
- No. of ministers: 8 (Note: Does not include the prime minister.)
- Total no. of members: 12
- Member party: Liberal–Democratic
- Status in legislature: Majority (single-party)
- Opposition party: Conservative
- Opposition leader: Antonio Maura

History
- Predecessor: Montero Ríos II
- Successor: López Domínguez

The first government of Segismundo Moret was formed on 1 December 1905, following the latter's appointment as prime minister of Spain by King Alfonso XIII and his swearing-in that same day, as a result of Eugenio Montero Ríos's resignation from the post on 30 November in the wake of the ¡Cu-Cut! incident. It succeeded the first Montero government and was the government of Spain from 1 December 1905 to 6 July 1906, a total of 217 days, or 7 months and 5 days.

The cabinet comprised members of the Liberal–Democratic alliance, one independent—most notably, Rafael Gasset, a former Villaverdist—and two military officers. The government was disestablished and replaced by a new cabinet under José López Domínguez following the King's rejection to issue a dissolution decree for Moret who, aiming to provide himself with a renewed parliamentary majority in the wake of an internal party crisis over the Law of Jurisdictions, intended to call a snap election.

Moret's intent to trigger such a parliamentary dissolution, which lingered for several months from March to July 1906 and which had the opposition of Conservative leader Antonio Maura, was dubbed as the "dissolution crisis" (crisis de la disolución).

== Formation ==
=== Overview ===
The Spanish Constitution of 1876 enshrined Spain as a semi-constitutional monarchy during the Restoration period, awarding the monarch—under the royal prerogative—the power to appoint government members (including the prime minister); the ability to grant or deny the decree of dissolution of the Cortes, or the adjournment of legislative sessions, to the incumbent or aspiring government that requested it; and the capacity to inform, inspect and ultimately control executive acts by granting or denying the signature of royal decrees; among others.

The monarch would play a key role in the turno system by appointing and dismissing governments, which would then organize elections to provide themselves with a parliamentary majority. As a result, governments during this period were dependent on royal confidence, which was frequently secured or lost based on the leaders' ability to guarantee the internal unity and parliamentary cohesion of their parties. In practice, the royal prerogative was not exercised freely by the monarch, but was carried out through the opening of a round of consultations—with the presidents of the chambers, the leaders of the main parties, the potential candidates and other notable figures—prior to government formation, or when prime ministers raised a matter of confidence to the monarch.

=== Cabinet crisis ===
King Alfonso XIII held a round of consultations on 1 December 1905 to determine a solution to the political crisis arising from Montero Ríos's resignation.

Consultations; King of Spain
Date	Consultee	Office/position	Party
1 December 1905	Marquis of Vega de Armijo	President of the Congress of Deputies	Lib–Dem^{/Dem}
1 December 1905	José López Domínguez	President of the Senate	Military
1 December 1905	Segismundo Moret	Leader of the Liberal Party (former)	Lib–Dem^{/Lib}
Nominations
Outcome →	Nomination of Segismundo Moret (Liberal) Accepted		

The outcome of the consultations led Alfonso XIII to entrust the formation of a new government to Segismundo Moret, who accepted the nomination.

== Cabinet changes ==
Moret's first government saw a number of cabinet changes during its tenure:

- As a result of Minister of the Navy-designate, Víctor María Concas, being absent from Madrid upon the cabinet's formation, Segismundo Moret personally took over the discharge of duties of the ministry until Concas could be sworn in on 4 December 1905.
- Amid growing divisions within the Liberal Party over the approval of the Law of Jurisdictions, and with Segismundo Moret's plan to trigger a parliamentary dissolution—in order to secure a more favourable Liberal majority in a snap election—not finding unanimous support among his cabinet's ministers, a government crisis was announced on 7 June 1906, with a cabinet reshuffle seeing the entry of ministers more loyal to Moret. The new cabinet on 10 June saw Manuel García Prieto being replaced as Grace and Justice minister by José María Celleruelo; the Count of Romanones by Benigno Quiroga at the helm of the Governance ministry; and Alejandro San Martín replacing Vicente Santamaría de Paredes as new minister of Public Instruction and Fine Arts. Both Celleruelo and San Martín had been members of Canalejas' democratic faction.
- The death on 23 June 1906 of Minister of State Duke of Almodóvar del Río, saw the appointment of Juan Pérez-Caballero y Ferrer as new officeholder one week later. In the interim, Undersecretary of State Emilio de Ojeda took on the ministry's ordinary discharge of duties.

== Council of Ministers ==
The Council of Ministers was structured into the office for the prime minister and eight ministries.

← Moret I Government → (1 December 1905 – 6 July 1906)
Portfolio	Name	Party	Took office	Left office	Ref.
Prime Minister	Segismundo Moret	Lib–Dem^{/Lib}	1 December 1905	6 July 1906	
Minister of State	Duke of Almodóvar del Río	Lib–Dem^{/Lib}	1 December 1905	23 June 1906†	
Minister of Grace and Justice	Manuel García Prieto	Lib–Dem^{/Dem}	1 December 1905	10 June 1906	
Minister of War	Agustín de Luque	Military	1 December 1905	6 July 1906	
Minister of the Navy	Segismundo Moret took on the discharge of duties from 1 to 4 December 1905.				
Minister of Finance	Amós Salvador y Rodrigáñez	Lib–Dem^{/Dem}	1 December 1905	6 July 1906	
Minister of Governance	Count of Romanones	Lib–Dem^{/Lib}	1 December 1905	10 June 1906	
Minister of Public Instruction and Fine Arts	Vicente Santamaría de Paredes	Lib–Dem^{/Lib}	1 December 1905	10 June 1906	
Minister of Development	Rafael Gasset	Independent	1 December 1905	6 July 1906	
=== Changes December 1905 ===
Portfolio	Name	Party	Took office	Left office	Ref.
Minister of the Navy	Víctor María Concas	Military	4 December 1905	6 July 1906	
=== Changes 10 June 1906 ===
Portfolio	Name	Party	Took office	Left office	Ref.
Minister of Grace and Justice	José María Celleruelo	Lib–Dem^{/Dem}	10 June 1906	6 July 1906	
Minister of Governance	Benigno Quiroga	Lib–Dem^{/Lib}	10 June 1906	6 July 1906	
Minister of Public Instruction and Fine Arts	Alejandro San Martín	Lib–Dem^{/Dem}	10 June 1906	6 July 1906	
=== Changes 23 June 1906 ===
Portfolio	Name	Party	Took office	Left office	Ref.
Minister of State	Emilio de Ojeda took on the discharge of duties from 23 to 30 June 1906.				
=== Changes 30 June 1906 ===
Portfolio	Name	Party	Took office	Left office	Ref.
Minister of State	Juan Pérez-Caballero	Lib–Dem^{/Lib}	30 June 1906	6 July 1906	

== Bibliography ==
- Constitución de la Monarquía Española (PDF) (Constitution). Madrid Gazette (in Spanish). King of Spain. 30 June 1876.
- Soldevilla, Fernando (1906). El Año Político 1905 (in Spanish). Madrid: National Library of Spain.
- Soldevilla, Fernando (1907). El Año Político 1906 (in Spanish). Madrid: National Library of Spain.
- Calero, Antonio María (1987). "La prerrogativa regia en la Restauración: teoría y práctica (1875-1902)" (PDF). Revista de Estudios Políticos (in Spanish) (55). Madrid: Centre for Political and Constitutional Studies: 273–315. ISSN 0048-7694.
- Martorell Linares, Miguel Ángel (1997). "La crisis parlamentaria de 1913-1917. La quiebra del sistema de relaciones parlamentarias de la Restauración" (PDF). Revista de Estudios Políticos (in Spanish) (96). Madrid: Centre for Political and Constitutional Studies: 137–161. ISSN 0048-7694.

Preceded by Montero Ríos II	Government of Spain; 1905–1906	Succeeded by López Domínguez
