= Second government of Raimundo Fernández-Villaverde =

2nd government of Raimundo Fernández-Villaverde
- Government of Spain
- 1905
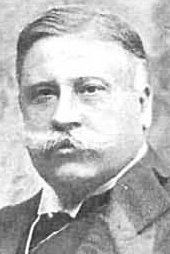
- Fernández-Villaverde before 1905
- Date formed: 27 January 1905
- Date dissolved: 23 June 1905

People and organisations
- Monarch: Alfonso XIII
- Prime Minister: Raimundo Fernández-Villaverde
- No. of ministers: 8 (Note: Does not include the prime minister.)
- Total no. of members: 9
- Member party: Conservative (mostly from the Villaverdist faction)
- Status in legislature: Minority (single-party)
- Opposition party: Liberal Democratic; Liberal
- Opposition leader: Eugenio Montero Ríos; Segismundo Moret

History
- Predecessor: Azcárraga III
- Successor: Montero Ríos I

The second government of Raimundo Fernández-Villaverde was formed on 27 January 1905, following the latter's appointment as prime minister of Spain by King Alfonso XIII and his swearing-in on that day, as a result of Marcelo Azcárraga's resignation from the post on 26 January over disagreements within his cabinet on the date of re-opening of the Cortes. It succeeded the third Azcárraga government and was the government of Spain from 27 January to 23 June 1905, a total of 147 days, or 4 months and 27 days.

The cabinet comprised members of the Conservative Party, mostly from its Villaverdist faction, as well as one military officer. As neither Conservative leader Antonio Maura nor the Liberals under Eugenio Montero Ríos and Segismundo Moret were willing to support Villaverde, his government was left in a clear parliamentary minority, surviving only for as long as the parliament remained closed. Once the Cortes were re-opened on 14 June 1905, Villaverde's government suffered a string of parliamentary defeats until it was brought down in a vote of confidence on 20 June.

== Formation ==
=== Overview ===
The Spanish Constitution of 1876 enshrined Spain as a semi-constitutional monarchy during the Restoration period, awarding the monarch—under the royal prerogative—the power to appoint government members (including the prime minister); the ability to grant or deny the decree of dissolution of the Cortes, or the adjournment of legislative sessions, to the incumbent or aspiring government that requested it; and the capacity to inform, inspect and ultimately control executive acts by granting or denying the signature of royal decrees; among others.

The monarch would play a key role in the turno system by appointing and dismissing governments, which would then organize elections to provide themselves with a parliamentary majority. As a result, governments during this period were dependent on royal confidence, which was frequently secured or lost based on the leaders' ability to guarantee the internal unity and parliamentary cohesion of their parties. In practice, the royal prerogative was not exercised freely by the monarch, but was carried out through the opening of a round of consultations—with the presidents of the chambers, the leaders of the main parties, the potential candidates and other notable figures—prior to government formation, or when prime ministers raised a matter of confidence to the monarch.

=== Cabinet crisis ===
King Alfonso XIII held a round of consultations on 26 January 1905 to determine a solution to the political crisis arising from Azcárraga's resignation.

Consultations; King of Spain
Date	Consultee	Office/position	Party
26 January 1905	Francisco Romero Robledo	President of the Congress of Deputies	Romerist
26 January 1905	2nd Marquis of Pidal	President of the Senate	Conservative
26 January 1905	Alejandro Pidal y Mon	President of the Congress of Deputies (former)	Conservative
26 January 1905	Francisco Silvela	Prime Minister (former)	Conservative
26 January 1905	Antonio Maura	Leader of the Conservative Party; Prime Minister (former)	Conservative
26 January 1905	Raimundo Fernández-Villaverde	Prime Minister (former); President of the Congress of Deputies (former)	Villaverdist
Nominations
Outcome →	Nomination of Francisco Silvela (Conservative) No Declined; Nomination of Antonio Maura (Conservative) No Declined; Nomination of Raimundo Fernández-Villaverde (Villaverdist) Accepted		

The outcome of the consultations led Alfonso XIII to entrust the formation of a new government to Francisco Silvela, who declined the nomination due to him "having retired from politics" and not wishing to "get involved in the parties' infighting"; then to Antonio Maura, who declined the nomination on the need to re-open the Cortes as soon as possible to deal with the previous government crises (his own and Azcárraga's), among other reasons; then to Raimundo Fernández-Villaverde, who accepted the nomination.

== Cabinet changes ==
Villaverde's second government saw one cabinet change during its tenure:

- Disagreements over the management of a widespread student conflict—started by the perceived unfairness of certain legal provisions approved during the tenure of Lorenzo Domínguez Pascual at the helm of the Ministry of Public Instruction, as well as the government's inflexibility in addressing the issue—led to the resignation of Public Instruction Minister Juan de la Cierva on 8 April 1905, being replaced in the post by Carlos Cortezo.

== Vote of confidence ==
Motion of confidence Congress of Deputies; Confidence in the Government (Joaquín Llorens)
Ballot →	20 June 1905
Required majority →	Simple
Yes: • Conservatives (37); • Romerists (7); • Integrists (1)	45 / 403
No: • Conservatives (110); • Liberal Democrats (40); • Liberals (27); • Republicans (21); • Carlists (4); • Integrists (1); • Independents (1)	204 / 403
Not voting	154 / 403

== Council of Ministers ==
The Council of Ministers was structured into the office for the prime minister and eight ministries.

← Villaverde II Government → (27 January – 23 June 1905)
Portfolio	Name	Party	Took office	Left office	Ref.
Prime Minister	Raimundo Fernández-Villaverde	Villaverdist	27 January 1905	23 June 1905	
Minister of State	Wenceslao Ramírez de Villa-Urrutia	Villaverdist	27 January 1905	23 June 1905	
Minister of Grace and Justice	Javier Ugarte y Pagés	Villaverdist	27 January 1905	23 June 1905	
Minister of War	Vicente Martitegui	Military	27 January 1905	23 June 1905	
Minister of the Navy	Eduardo Cobián	Villaverdist	27 January 1905	23 June 1905	
Minister of Finance	Antonio García Alix	Villaverdist	27 January 1905	23 June 1905	
Minister of Governance	Augusto González Besada	Villaverdist	27 January 1905	23 June 1905	
Minister of Public Instruction and Fine Arts	Juan de la Cierva	Conservative	27 January 1905	8 April 1905	
Minister of Agriculture, Industry, Trade and Public Works	8th Marquis of Vadillo	Villaverdist	27 January 1905	23 June 1905	
=== Changes April 1905 ===
Portfolio	Name	Party	Took office	Left office	Ref.
Minister of Public Instruction and Fine Arts	Carlos Cortezo	Villaverdist	8 April 1905	23 June 1905	

== Bibliography ==
- Constitución de la Monarquía Española (PDF) (Constitution). Madrid Gazette (in Spanish). King of Spain. 30 June 1876.
- Soldevilla, Fernando (1906). El Año Político 1905 (in Spanish). Madrid: National Library of Spain.
- Calero, Antonio María (1987). "La prerrogativa regia en la Restauración: teoría y práctica (1875-1902)" (PDF). Revista de Estudios Políticos (in Spanish) (55). Madrid: Centre for Political and Constitutional Studies: 273–315. ISSN 0048-7694.
- Martorell Linares, Miguel Ángel (1997). "La crisis parlamentaria de 1913-1917. La quiebra del sistema de relaciones parlamentarias de la Restauración" (PDF). Revista de Estudios Políticos (in Spanish) (96). Madrid: Centre for Political and Constitutional Studies: 137–161. ISSN 0048-7694.
- Session Diaries (Congress). "Diarios de sesiones (serie histórica). Congreso de los Diputados". Diaries of Sessions of the Congress of Deputies (in Spanish). Congress of Deputies.

Preceded by Azcárraga III	Government of Spain; 1905	Succeeded by Montero Ríos I
