= Second government of Eugenio Montero Ríos =

2nd government of Eugenio Montero Ríos
- Government of Spain
- 1905
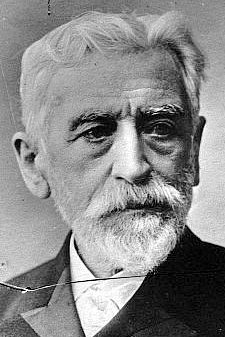
- Montero Ríos before 1914
- Date formed: 31 October 1905
- Date dissolved: 1 December 1905

People and organisations
- Monarch: Alfonso XIII
- Prime Minister: Eugenio Montero Ríos
- No. of ministers: 7 (Note: Does not include the prime minister.)
- Total no. of members: 7
- Member party: Liberal–Democratic
- Status in legislature: Majority (single-party)
- Opposition party: Conservative
- Opposition leader: Antonio Maura

History
- Predecessor: Montero Ríos I
- Successor: Moret I

The second government of Eugenio Montero Ríos was formed on 31 October 1905, following the latter's appointment as prime minister of Spain by King Alfonso XIII on 28 October and his swearing-in three days later, as a result of his own resignation from the post on 27 October in order to trigger a cabinet reshuffle. It succeeded the first Montero government and was the government of Spain from 31 October to 1 December 1905, a total of 31 days, or 1 month and 1 day.

The cabinet comprised members of the Liberal–Democratic alliance, one independent and one military officer. It was disestablished in the wake of the ¡Cu-Cut! incident and was succeeded by the first Moret government.

== Formation ==
=== Overview ===
The Spanish Constitution of 1876 enshrined Spain as a semi-constitutional monarchy during the Restoration period, awarding the monarch—under the royal prerogative—the power to appoint government members (including the prime minister); the ability to grant or deny the decree of dissolution of the Cortes, or the adjournment of legislative sessions, to the incumbent or aspiring government that requested it; and the capacity to inform, inspect and ultimately control executive acts by granting or denying the signature of royal decrees; among others.

The monarch would play a key role in the turno system by appointing and dismissing governments, which would then organize elections to provide themselves with a parliamentary majority. As a result, governments during this period were dependent on royal confidence, which was frequently secured or lost based on the leaders' ability to guarantee the internal unity and parliamentary cohesion of their parties. In practice, the royal prerogative was not exercised freely by the monarch, but was carried out through the opening of a round of consultations—with the presidents of the chambers, the leaders of the main parties, the potential candidates and other notable figures—prior to government formation, or when prime ministers raised a matter of confidence to the monarch.

=== Cabinet crisis ===
King Alfonso XIII held a round of consultations on 28 October 1905 to determine a solution to the political crisis arising from Montero Ríos's resignation.

Consultations; King of Spain
Date	Consultee	Office/position	Party
28 October 1905	José López Domínguez	President of the Senate	Military
28 October 1905	Marquis of Vega de Armijo	President of the Congress of Deputies	Lib–Dem^{/Dem}
28 October 1905	Segismundo Moret	Leader of the Liberal Party (former)	Lib–Dem^{/Lib}
28 October 1905	Eugenio Montero Ríos	Prime Minister; Leader of the Liberal Party	Lib–Dem^{/Dem}
Nominations
Outcome →	Nomination of Eugenio Montero Ríos (Liberal) Accepted		

The outcome of the consultations led Alfonso XIII to entrust the formation of a new government to Eugenio Montero Ríos, who accepted the nomination.

== Council of Ministers ==
The Council of Ministers was structured into the office for the prime minister and eight ministries.

← Montero Ríos II Government → (31 October – 1 December 1905)
Portfolio	Name	Party	Took office	Left office	Ref.
Prime Minister	Eugenio Montero Ríos	Lib–Dem^{/Dem}	31 October 1905	1 December 1905	
Minister of State	Pío Gullón	Lib–Dem^{/Dem}	31 October 1905	1 December 1905	
Minister of Grace and Justice	Joaquín López Puigcerver	Lib–Dem^{/Dem}	31 October 1905	1 December 1905	
Minister of War; Minister of the Navy	Valeriano Weyler	Military	31 October 1905	1 December 1905	
Minister of Finance	José Echegaray	Independent	31 October 1905	1 December 1905	
Minister of Governance	Manuel García Prieto	Lib–Dem^{/Dem}	31 October 1905	1 December 1905	
Minister of Public Instruction and Fine Arts	Manuel de Eguilior	Lib–Dem^{/Dem}	31 October 1905	1 December 1905	
Minister of Development	Count of Romanones	Lib–Dem^{/Lib}	31 October 1905	1 December 1905	

== Bibliography ==
- Constitución de la Monarquía Española (PDF) (Constitution). Madrid Gazette (in Spanish). King of Spain. 30 June 1876.
- Soldevilla, Fernando (1906). El Año Político 1905 (in Spanish). Madrid: National Library of Spain.
- Calero, Antonio María (1987). "La prerrogativa regia en la Restauración: teoría y práctica (1875-1902)" (PDF). Revista de Estudios Políticos (in Spanish) (55). Madrid: Centre for Political and Constitutional Studies: 273–315. ISSN 0048-7694.
- Martorell Linares, Miguel Ángel (1997). "La crisis parlamentaria de 1913-1917. La quiebra del sistema de relaciones parlamentarias de la Restauración" (PDF). Revista de Estudios Políticos (in Spanish) (96). Madrid: Centre for Political and Constitutional Studies: 137–161. ISSN 0048-7694.

Preceded by Montero Ríos I	Government of Spain; 1905	Succeeded by Moret I
