= Our Lady of Placeres Church =

Neo-gothic church in Pontevedra, Spain

- Iglesia de Nuestra Señora de los Placeres
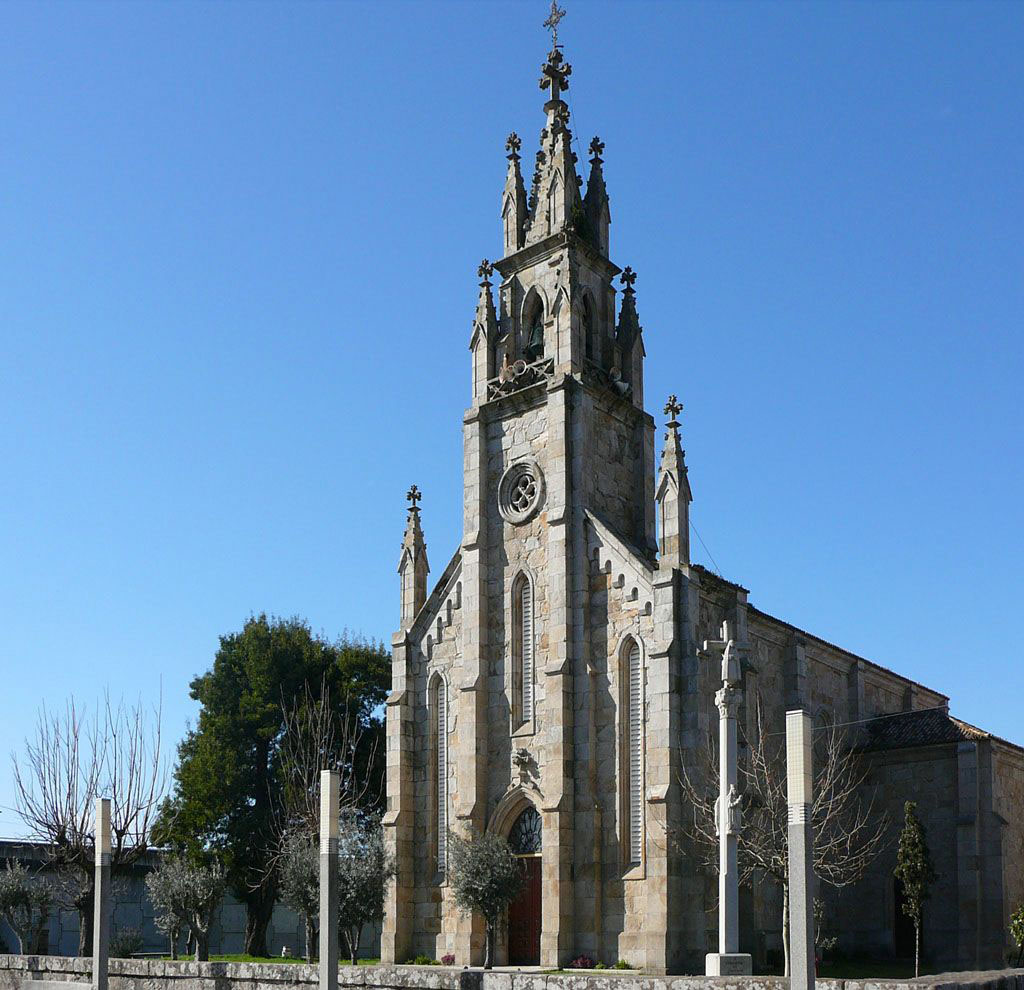
- Façade of the church
- Our Lady of Placeres Church
- 42°24′19.08″N 8°40′59.88″W
- Location: Pontevedra, Galicia
- Country: Spain
- Denomination: Catholic Church

History
- Consecrated: 1888

Architecture
- Groundbreaking: 1887
- Completed: 1888

Administration
- Archdiocese: Santiago de Compostela

Our Lady of Placeres Church (Galician: Igrexa da Nosa Señora dos Praceres) is a Catholic church in the civil parish of Lourizán, municipality of Pontevedra, Galicia, Spain. The church was built at the end of the 19th century in neo-Gothic style over a previous chapel at the end of the harbour bar.

== History ==
Our Lady of Placeres was venerated in this place since the Middle Ages because it was dangerous for sailors. Ships were warned by a lantern which also served to indicate the jurisdictional waters of Pontevedra. Our Lady of Placeres helped to overcome the difficulties encountered in crossing the bar of the port. On the other hand, the troops of the corsair Francis Drake did not manage to cross this sandbar located in Lourizán, a fact that the inhabitants of Pontevedra interpreted as a defence of the city by the Virgin.

In the 1880s, the priest of Lourizán, Marcial Sineiro, in view of the deterioration of the old parish church, approached the city council of Pontevedra and the archbishop of Santiago de Compostela to ask for help in building a new church, a request that was rejected due to a lack of economic resources. The priest, supported by the neighbours, approached Eugenio Montero Ríos, a member of the Spanish Parliament, to ask him to intervene with the Ministry of Grace and Justice so that the State would approve the construction of the new church. Montero Rios intervened before the Ministry and also donated part of the land he owned near the sandbank. The project was entrusted to the architect Domingo Sesmero and the work was awarded at a cost of over 72,000 pesetas.

The first stone of the church was laid on 10 May 1887 and the work was completed on 19 November 1888. In recognition of the fact that the work is due to his initiative and protection, the mortal remains of Eugenio Montero Ríos, benefactor of the church, and his wife, Avelina Villegas Budiños, rest in a pantheon inside the church, in the left-hand chapel next to the altar of Our Lady of Placeres (formerly known as the Virgin of Quitapesares).

== Description ==
The church is in the neo-Gothic style, inspired by the Flamboyant Gothic style, is built of granite stone and has a central tower 33 metres high.

Its floor plan is in the form of a Latin cross. It has a single large nave with two side Chapels near the semi-decagonal apse. The nave, covered with Groin vaults, is composed of three rectangular sections separated by semicircular double arches. Its interior ornamentation is Gothic and consists of three white marble slabs with inscriptions dedicated to the reign of Alfonso XIII when the temple was built; to the President of the Council of Ministers, Práxedes Mateo Sagasta and to the illustrious Galician Eugenio Montero Ríos.

The main façade has high Buttresses and ends in a Gothic spire. The entrance door is framed by two broken archivolts. Above and to the sides of the door there are narrow, very elongated windows, finished with pointed arches. Above the central window there is a rose window with a four-petal flower.

The floor plan of the temple and its main façade are oriented to the east, in the opposite direction to what would be usual (oriented to the west, facing the sea and the ria de Pontevedra).

== Gallery ==
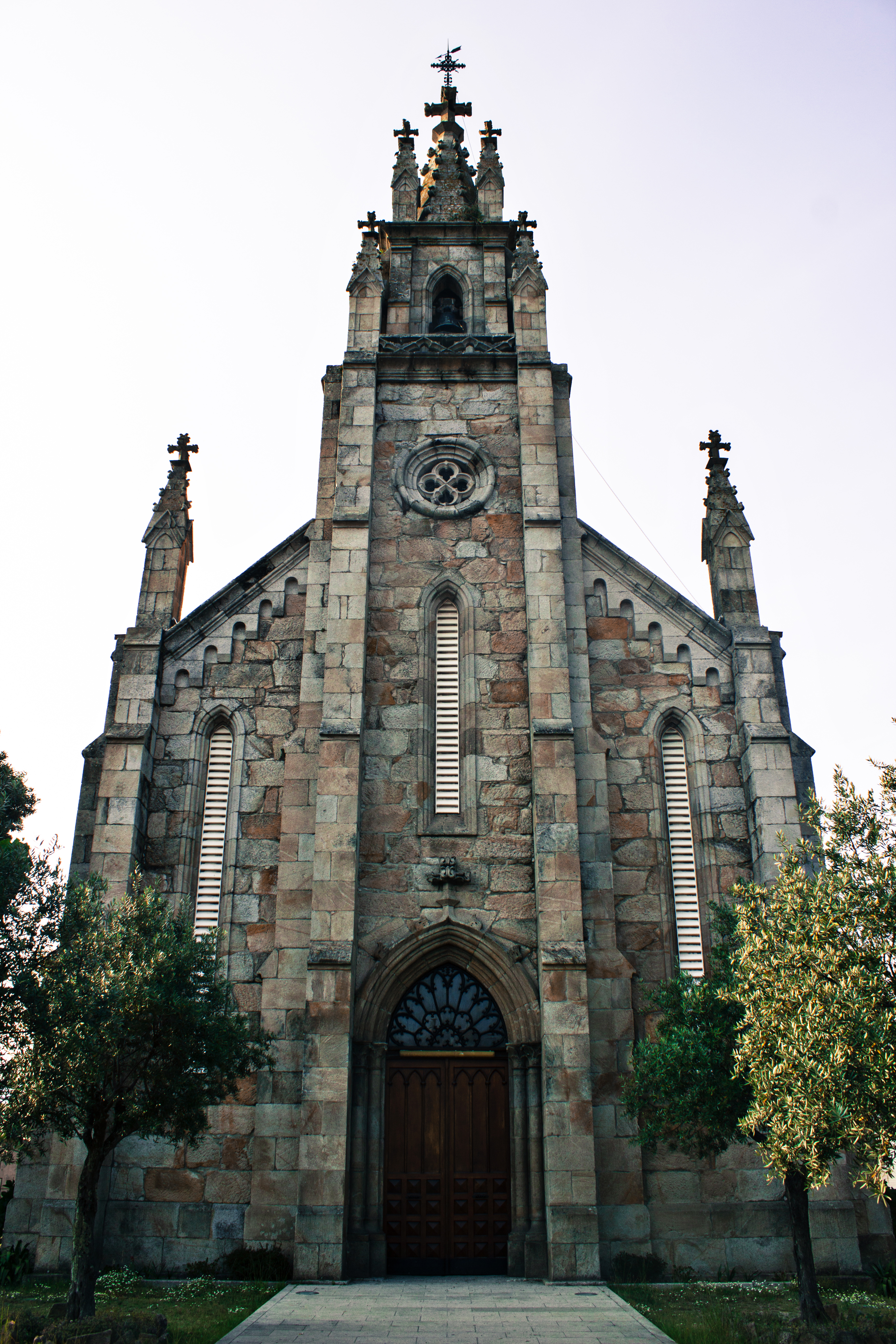
Façade

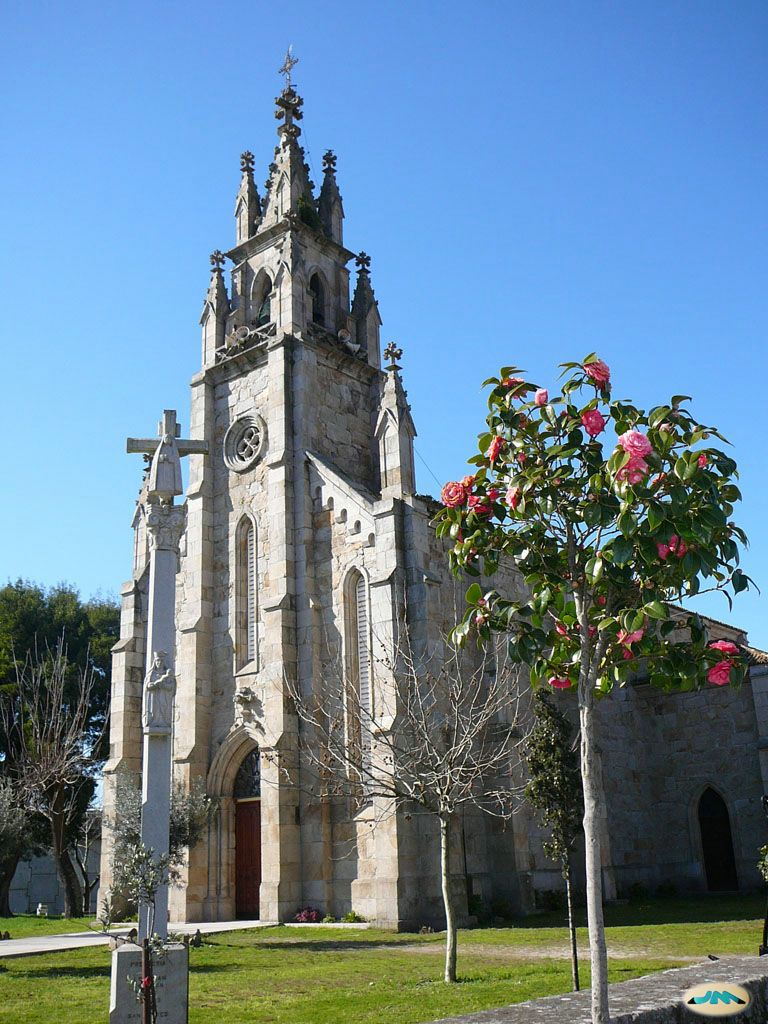
Façade and side wall of the church

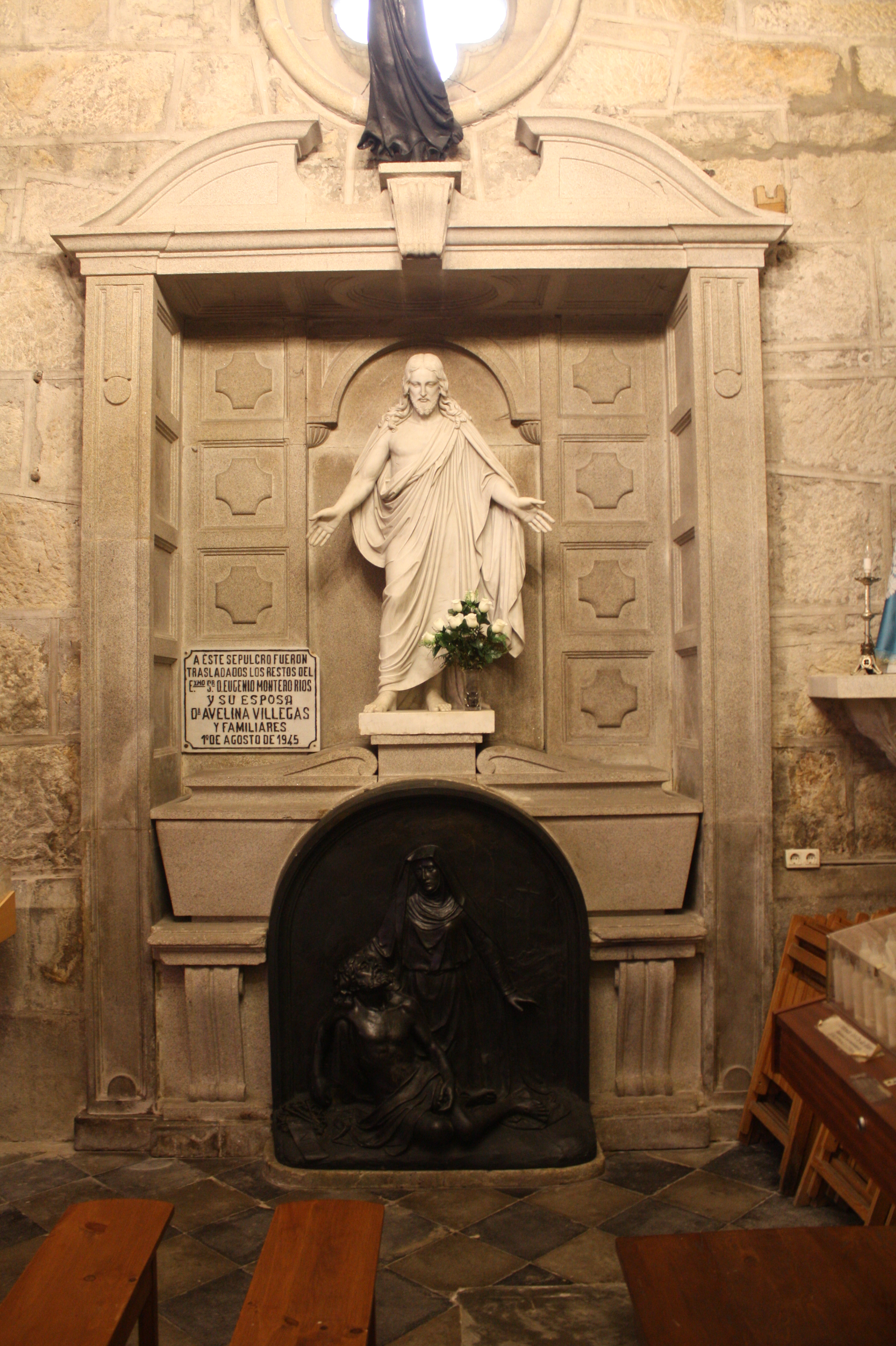
The tomb of Eugenio Montero Ríos inside

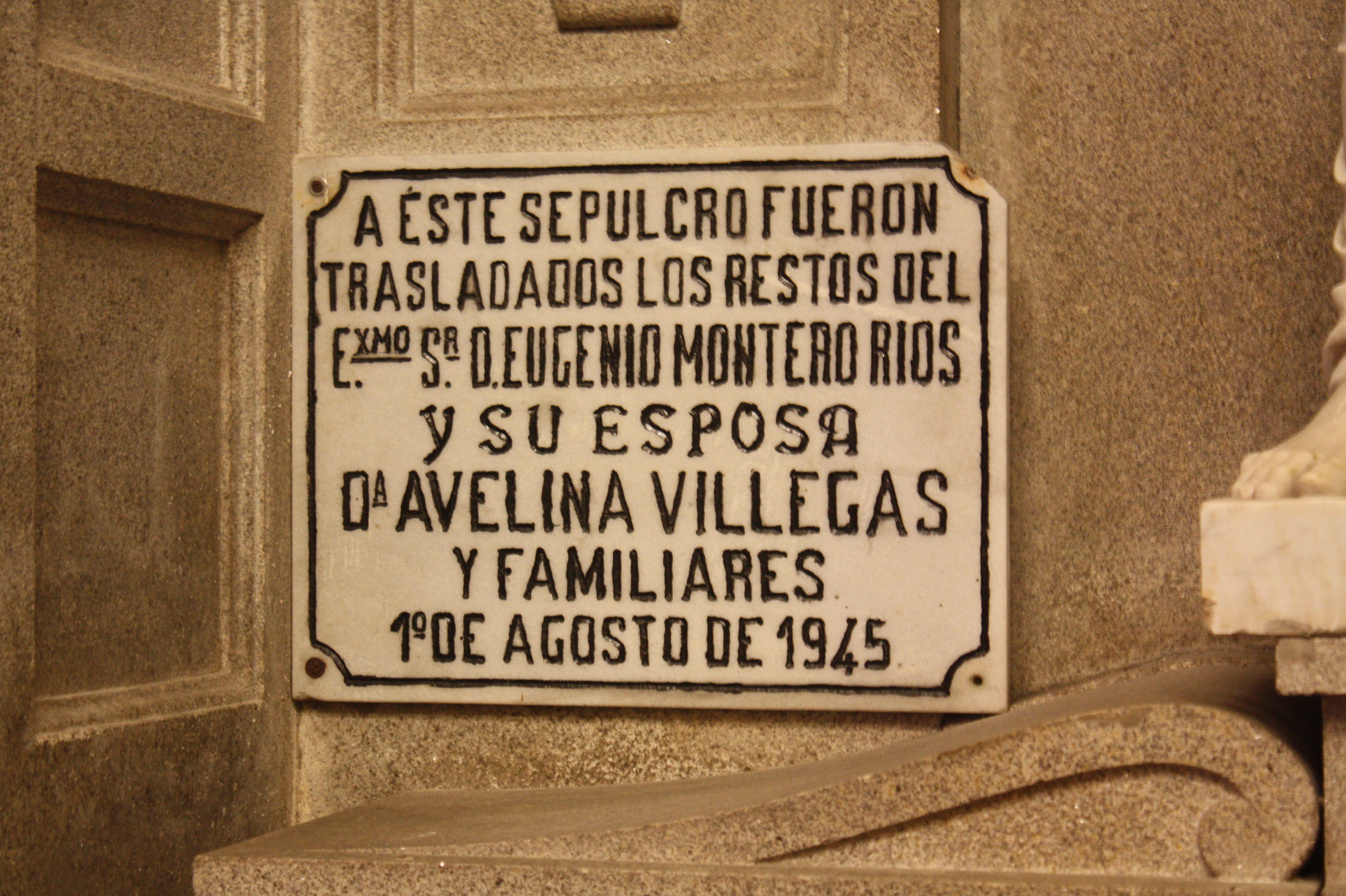
Slab next to the tomb

== See also ==
- Catholic Church in Spain
