= First government of Eugenio Montero Ríos =

1st government of Eugenio Montero Ríos
- Government of Spain
- 1905
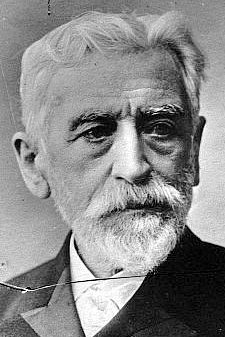
- Montero Ríos before 1914
- Date formed: 23 June 1905
- Date dissolved: 31 October 1905

People and organisations
- Monarch: Alfonso XIII
- Prime Minister: Eugenio Montero Ríos
- No. of ministers: 8 (Note: Does not include the prime minister.)
- Total no. of members: 9
- Member party: Liberal–Democratic
- Status in legislature: Minority (single-party) (Jun–Oct 1905); Majority (single-party) (Oct 1905)
- Opposition party: Conservative
- Opposition leader: Antonio Maura

History
- Predecessor: Villaverde II
- Successor: Montero Ríos II

The first government of Eugenio Montero Ríos was formed on 23 June 1905, following the latter's appointment as prime minister of Spain by King Alfonso XIII on 21 June and his swearing-in two days later, as a result of Raimundo Fernández-Villaverde's resignation from the post following his defeat in a vote of confidence on 20 June 1905. It succeeded the second Villaverde government and was the government of Spain from 23 June to 31 October 1905, a total of 130 days, or 4 months and 8 days.

The cabinet comprised members of the Liberal–Democratic alliance, a number of independents and one military officer. Upon the re-opening of the Cortes in October 1905 following that year's general election, the requests from several ministries to increase their budgets were turned down by the prime minister and the finance minister, who were wary of budget deficit. A government crisis was triggered later in the month, over growing mistrusts between the various Liberal factions and Montero Ríos's desire to have a cabinet that could count with their support; this prompted Montero Ríos's resignation on 27 October to undertake a cabinet reshuffle, with the second Montero Ríos government being formed four days later.

== Formation ==
=== Overview ===
The Spanish Constitution of 1876 enshrined Spain as a semi-constitutional monarchy during the Restoration period, awarding the monarch—under the royal prerogative—the power to appoint government members (including the prime minister); the ability to grant or deny the decree of dissolution of the Cortes, or the adjournment of legislative sessions, to the incumbent or aspiring government that requested it; and the capacity to inform, inspect and ultimately control executive acts by granting or denying the signature of royal decrees; among others.

The monarch would play a key role in the turno system by appointing and dismissing governments, which would then organize elections to provide themselves with a parliamentary majority. As a result, governments during this period were dependent on royal confidence, which was frequently secured or lost based on the leaders' ability to guarantee the internal unity and parliamentary cohesion of their parties. In practice, the royal prerogative was not exercised freely by the monarch, but was carried out through the opening of a round of consultations—with the presidents of the chambers, the leaders of the main parties, the potential candidates and other notable figures—prior to government formation, or when prime ministers raised a matter of confidence to the monarch.

=== Cabinet crisis ===
King Alfonso XIII held a round of consultations on 21 June 1905 to determine a solution to the political crisis arising from Villaverde's resignation.

Consultations; King of Spain
Date	Consultee	Office/position	Party
21 June 1905	2nd Marquis of Pidal	President of the Senate	Conservative
21 June 1905	Francisco Romero Robledo	President of the Congress of Deputies	Romerist
21 June 1905	Antonio Maura	Leader of the Conservative Party; Prime Minister (former)	Conservative
21 June 1905	Marcelo Azcárraga	Prime Minister (former); President of the Senate (former)	Military
21 June 1905	Eugenio Montero Ríos	Leader of the Liberal Democratic Party; President of the Senate (former)	Lib–Dem^{/Dem}
21 June 1905	Marquis of Vega de Armijo	President of the Congress of Deputies (former)	Lib–Dem^{/Dem}
21 June 1905	Segismundo Moret	Leader of the Liberal Party	Lib–Dem^{/Lib}
21 June 1905	Raimundo Fernández-Villaverde	Prime Minister	Villaverdist
Nominations
Outcome →	Nomination of Eugenio Montero Ríos (Liberal) Accepted		

The outcome of the consultations led Alfonso XIII to entrust the formation of a new government to Eugenio Montero Ríos, who accepted the nomination on the condition that the Conservative Party granted its parliamentary support to extend the 1904 budget for one quarter.

== Cabinet changes ==
Montero Ríos's first government saw one cabinet change during its tenure:

- A public dispute with the public works minister (the Count of Romanones) over the urgent granting of an extraordinary loan—intended to alleviate the effects of an agrarian crisis in Andalusia by promoting public works that had been left paralyzed—led to the resignation on 14 July 1905 of Finance Minister Ángel Urzaiz, who opposed the extraordinary loan and its urgency (considering it part of a clientelism strategy by Romanones). He was replaced in the post by José Echegaray on 18 July.

== Council of Ministers ==
The Council of Ministers was structured into the office for the prime minister and eight ministries.

← Montero Ríos I Government → (23 June – 31 October 1905)
Portfolio	Name	Party	Took office	Left office	Ref.
Prime Minister	Eugenio Montero Ríos	Lib–Dem^{/Dem}	23 June 1905	31 October 1905	
Minister of State	Felipe Sánchez Román	Lib–Dem^{/Dem}	23 June 1905	31 October 1905	
Minister of Grace and Justice	Joaquín González de la Peña	Independent	23 June 1905	31 October 1905	
Minister of War	Valeriano Weyler	Military	23 June 1905	31 October 1905	
Minister of the Navy	Miguel Villanueva	Lib–Dem^{/Dem}	23 June 1905	31 October 1905	
Minister of Finance	Ángel Urzaiz	Lib–Dem^{/Dem}	23 June 1905	18 July 1905	
Minister of Governance	Manuel García Prieto	Lib–Dem^{/Dem}	23 June 1905	31 October 1905	
Minister of Public Instruction and Fine Arts	Andrés Mellado	Lib–Dem^{/Dem}	23 June 1905	31 October 1905	
Minister of Agriculture, Industry, Trade and Public Works	Count of Romanones	Lib–Dem^{/Lib}	23 June 1905	31 October 1905	
=== Changes July 1905 ===
Portfolio	Name	Party	Took office	Left office	Ref.
Minister of Finance	José Echegaray	Independent	18 July 1905	31 October 1905	

== Bibliography ==
- Constitución de la Monarquía Española (PDF) (Constitution). Madrid Gazette (in Spanish). King of Spain. 30 June 1876.
- Soldevilla, Fernando (1906). El Año Político 1905 (in Spanish). Madrid: National Library of Spain.
- Calero, Antonio María (1987). "La prerrogativa regia en la Restauración: teoría y práctica (1875-1902)" (PDF). Revista de Estudios Políticos (in Spanish) (55). Madrid: Centre for Political and Constitutional Studies: 273–315. ISSN 0048-7694.
- Martorell Linares, Miguel Ángel (1997). "La crisis parlamentaria de 1913-1917. La quiebra del sistema de relaciones parlamentarias de la Restauración" (PDF). Revista de Estudios Políticos (in Spanish) (96). Madrid: Centre for Political and Constitutional Studies: 137–161. ISSN 0048-7694.

Preceded by Villaverde II	Government of Spain; 1905	Succeeded by Montero Ríos II
