= José López Domínguez =

Spanish military officer and politician

The Most Excellent José López Domínguez
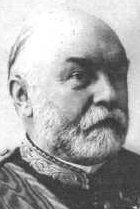

Prime Minister of Spain
- In office 6 July 1906 – 30 November 1906
- Monarch: Alfonso XIII
- Preceded by: Segismundo Moret
- Succeeded by: Segismundo Moret

President of the Senate of Spain
- In office 9 October 1905 – 6 July 1906
- Monarch: Alfonso XIII
- Preceded by: Marquess of Pidal
- Succeeded by: Eugenio Montero Ríos

Under Secretary of the Presidency
- In office 10 October 1868 – 26 June 1869
- Regent: Francisco Serrano
- Prime Minister: Fracisco Serrano; Juan Prim
- Minister of Grace and Justice: Antonio Romero Ortiz; Cristóbal Martín de Herrera
- Preceded by: Isidoro Lora
- Succeeded by: Feliciano Herreros de Tejada

Minister of War of Spain
- In office 13 October 1883 – 18 January 1884
- Monarch: Alfonso XII
- Prime Minister: José Posada Herrera
- Preceded by: Arsenio Martínez-Campos
- Succeeded by: Marquis of Miravalles
- In office 11 December 1892 – 23 March 1895
- Monarch: Alfonso XIII
- Prime Minister: Práxedes Mateo Sagasta
- Preceded by: Marcelo Azcárraga Palmero
- Succeeded by: Marcelo Azcárraga Palmero
- In office 6 July – 15 October 1906
- Monarch: Alfonso XIII
- Prime Minister: Himself
- Preceded by: Agustín de Luque y Coca
- Succeeded by: Agustín de Luque y Coca

Minister of the Navy of Spain
- Interim
- In office 11 December – 14 December 1892
- Monarch: Alfonso XIII
- Prime Minister: Práxedes Mateo Sagasta
- Preceded by: José María Beránger
- Succeeded by: Pascual Cervera y Topete

Captain General of Catalonia
- In office 20 July – 31 December 1874
- President: Francisco Serrano
- Prime Minister: Práxedes Mateo Sagasta
- Minister of War: Fernando Cotoner y Chacón (as interim); Francisco Serrano Bedoya
- Preceded by: Francisco Serrano Bedoya
- Succeeded by: Arsenio Martínez Campos

Personal details
- Born: José López Domínguez

José López Domínguez (29 November 1829, in Marbella – 17 October 1911, in Madrid), was a Spanish military officer and politician who was prime minister of Spain between 6 July and 30 November 1906.

== Biography ==
As a lieutenant of the artillery, he participated in the pronunciamiento of Leopoldo O'Donnell in 1854. He was sent as observer to the Crimean War and the Second Italian War of Independence. In 1859 - 1860 he fought in the Spanish-Moroccan War and reached the rank of colonel.

He joined the Liberal Union Party and was elected as a deputy several times. Related to General Serrano, he participated with him in the Revolution of 1868 and the Battle of Alcolea, in which the loyalists under Manuel Pavía were defeated. López Dominguez was promoted to general.

In 1871, he became mariscal de campo and personal military advisor to King Amadeo I of Spain. In 1873, he was appointed commander of the Army of the North against the Carlists in the Third Carlist War, but in the same year, he was asked by Emilio Castelar to lay siege to Cartagena, where the Cantonal Revolution had broken out. He had the city intensively bombarded and, on 12 January 1874, Cartagena was retaken. He then returned to the north and liberated Bilbao, which was under siege by the Carlists.

In 1874, under the new Serrano government, he became captain general of Catalonia.

In 1883, he was minister of war in the Posada Herrera government and, between 1892 and 1895, in the Sagasta government.

During the Second Melillan campaign, he became captain-general and was also the representative of Malaga in the Spanish senate, a chamber of which he became the president between 1905 and 1907.

In July 1906, aged 77, he became prime minister of Spain with a government supported by José Canalejas. In the first months, he was also minister of war. After a plot within his own party, led by Segismundo Moret, he was forced to resign after five months. After his resignation, he retired from politics

In 1908, he was given the Toison de Oro, or Order of the Golden Fleece.

He died on 17 October 1911 in Madrid.

== Sources ==
Political offices
Preceded by Segismundo Moret	Prime Minister of Spain; 6 July – 30 November 1906	Succeeded by Segismundo Moret
Preceded by Marcelo Azcárraga Palmero	President of the Senate; 1905–1907	Succeeded by Marcelo Azcárraga Palmero
