= Democratic Party (Spain, 1902) =

Democratic Party Partido Democrático
- Leader: José Canalejas; José López Domínguez; Eugenio Montero Ríos
- Founded: 5 November 1902 (original); 24 November 1903 (as PLD); 2 March 1907 (as PDM)
- Dissolved: 28 February 1907 (PLD); 10 June 1910
- Split from: Liberal Party
- Merged into: Liberal Party
- Ideology: Liberalism; Monarchism; Anti-clericalism
- Political position: Centre-left

The Democratic Party (Spanish: Partido Demócrata, PD), also known between 1903 and 1907 as the Liberal Democratic Party (Spanish: Partido Liberal Democrático, PLD) from 1907 onwards as the Monarchist Democratic Party (Spanish: Partido Democrático Monárquico, PDM) and, colloquially, as the Democrats (Spanish: Demócratas), was a Spanish political party formed in the Restoration period by José Canalejas, with a strong anti-clerical ideology.

== History ==
=== Democratic Party (1902–1903) ===
Its origins can be traced to José Canalejas' speech on 14 December 1900 voicing his position against clericalism, because of the "teaching given in certain schools, which leads to fanaticism"; he proclaimed himself as a "democrat" as he argued in favour of defending the monarchy and respecting religion, but without opposing "the currents of democratic ideas".

In March 1902, Canalejas was appointed as Agriculture Minister in the Liberal cabinet of Práxedes Mateo Sagasta, but disagreements with the government's signing—driven by then Governance Minister Segismundo Moret—of an accord with the Holy See (which allowed the Catholic Church to automatically legalize all religious orders in exchange of their registering in the Spanish Civil Registry) prompted his resignation in May 1902. Canalejas' split from the Liberal Party was confirmed following a heated parliamentary debate with Sagasta in November 1902, being followed by 31 deputies and 11 senators.

=== Liberal Democratic Party (1903–1907) ===
Following Sagasta's death in 1903, Canalejas' faction and José López Domínguez joined Eugenio Montero Ríos—who had only narrowly won the ballot for the Liberal leadership to Moret on 15 November that year, falling short of the two-thirds majority required for election—into the "Liberal Democratic Party", which was formalized on 24 November. This time, it was joined by 44 deputies and 53 senators.

In 1905, Montero Ríos agreed with Moret on a united front against the government of Raimundo Fernández-Villaverde. Upon his own appointment as prime minister in June 1905, all Liberal factions temporarily joined into a single bloc ahead of the September general election, but internal quarreling continued while in government: in the timespan of 19 months, six governments under four Liberal leaders succeeded each other, with no leader being able to command the support of a majority of Liberal parliamentary members and a new government being formed under Conservative leader Antonio Maura in January 1907.

=== Monarchist Democratic Party (1907–1910) ===
Following Montero Ríos' acceptance of Moret's leadership of the Liberal Party on 27 February 1907, the Liberal Democratic Party was refounded by Canalejas and López Domínguez into the "Monarchist Democratic Party" on 2 March.

Canalejas was appointed as Prime Minister of Spain on 9 February 1910 and leader of the Liberal Party on 20 July that year, with his Democratic Party having been formally dissolved on 10 June.

== See also ==
- Liberalism and radicalism in Spain

== Bibliography ==
- Soldevilla, Fernando (1901). El Año Político 1900 (in Spanish). Madrid: National Library of Spain.
- Soldevilla, Fernando (1903). El Año Político 1902 (in Spanish). Madrid: National Library of Spain.
- Soldevilla, Fernando (1904). El Año Político 1903 (in Spanish). Madrid: National Library of Spain.
- Soldevilla, Fernando (1905). El Año Político 1904 (in Spanish). Madrid: National Library of Spain.
- Soldevilla, Fernando (1906). El Año Político 1905 (in Spanish). Madrid: National Library of Spain.
- Soldevilla, Fernando (1908). El Año Político 1907 (in Spanish). Madrid: National Library of Spain.
- Soldevilla, Fernando (1911). El Año Político 1910 (in Spanish). Madrid: National Library of Spain.
- Dendle, Brian John (1986). "Galdós in context: The Republican Years, 1907-1914". Anales galdosianos (21). Alicante: Miguel de Cervantes Virtual Library: 33–44. ISSN 0569-9924.
- Aguilar Gavilán, Enrique (2012). "El asesinato de José Canalejas y su proyecto frustrado de nacionalización de la Monarquía" (PDF). Ámbitos. Revista de Estudios de Ciencias Sociales y Humanidades (in Spanish) (28). Córdoba: University of Córdoba: 79–86. ISSN 1575-2100.
- Session Diaries (Senate). "Diario de Sesiones. 1834-1923. Senado de España". Diaries of Sessions of the Senate of Spain (in Spanish). Senate of Spain.
