= Villaverdists =

Villaverdists Villaverdistas
- Leader: Raimundo Fernández-Villaverde
- Founded: 27 February 1904 (faction); 27 June 1905 (party)
- Dissolved: 17 April 1906
- Split from: Conservative Party
- Merged into: Conservative Party; Liberal Party
- Ideology: Conservatism; Orthodox economics
- Political position: Centre-right

The Villaverdists (Spanish: Villaverdistas), also known as the Villaverdist Conservatives (Spanish: Conservadores Villaverdistas), were a breakaway political faction led by Raimundo Fernández-Villaverde, which split from the Conservative Party in opposition to the economic policy of the then party leader, Antonio Maura.

The faction contested the September 1905 general election on its own, despite the death of Fernández-Villaverde in July. It was disbanded in April 1906, with its members joining both the Conservative and Liberal parties.

== History ==
The faction's origins can be traced back to the rivalry between Raimundo Fernández-Villaverde (who had been appointed as prime minister following the resignation of Francisco Silvela) and ascendant Conservative politician Antonio Maura (who supported Silvela's regenerationist agenda and had been singled out as his natural sucesor). Both had clashed within Silvela's government—as Finance and Governance ministers, respectively—as the former defended a rigid orthodox economic policy based on fiscal discipline and the gold standard, whereas the latter's position was more flexible in favour of corporatism, without neglecting social reforms. Conservative members proclaimed Maura as new party leader after a vigorous parliamentary speech in defense of Silvela and Conservative ideals on 11 November 1903, bringing about the downfall of Villaverde's government as it proved unable to get its 1904 budget bill through parliament.

Maura's policy of increasing public spending caused a rift within the Conservative Party, with Villaverde and his supporters—a total of 35 deputies—voting against the economic policy of the government. Maura's cabinet submitted its resignation in December 1904 over King Alfonso XIII's refusal to sign the appointment of General Francisco Loño as Chief of the Central Staff of the Army—since the king preferred General Camilo García de Polavieja—with Marcelo Azcárraga being appointed in the interim. Azcárra's cabinet lasted for little more than one month, with the King appointing Villaverde in his place. Villaverde's new cabinet was left in minority as Maura's Conservatives had refused to grant him support, and it only survived for as long as the Cortes remained closed; once they were re-opened, the government was brought down in a vote of confidence.

Following the appointment of a Liberal cabinet under Eugenio Montero Ríos and electoral preparations ahead of an incoming general election in September, the Conservative Party formally split between Maura and Villaverde on 27 June 1905, with the latter's supporters including Eduardo Cobián, Augusto González Besada, Antonio García Alix, Vicente Martitegui, Wenceslao Ramírez de Villa-Urrutia, Francisco Javier Ugarte y Pagés, Francisco Javier González de Castejón y Elío, Carlos Cortezo, Fernando Primo de Rivera, Manuel Danvila, Manuel Aguirre de Tejada, Fermín de Lasala y Collado, Francisco Guzmán y Carballeda, Cayetano Sánchez Bustillo, Gabino Bugallal y Araújo and César del Villar. Villaverde himself would suddenly die shortly after, on 15 July 1905.

The faction lingered for some time following Villaverde's death, taking the decision to continue defending the late prime minister's economic policy and contest in the incoming general election in September. It would end up merging dissolving itself in April 1906, with its members splitting into the Liberal and Conservative parties.

== Bibliography ==
- Soldevilla, Fernando (1904). El Año Político 1903 (in Spanish). Madrid: National Library of Spain.
- Soldevilla, Fernando (1905). El Año Político 1904 (in Spanish). Madrid: National Library of Spain.
- Soldevilla, Fernando (1906). El Año Político 1905 (in Spanish). Madrid: National Library of Spain.
- Soldevilla, Fernando (1907). El Año Político 1906 (in Spanish). Madrid: National Library of Spain.
- Comín Comín, Francisco (2002). "Raimundo Fernández Villaverde: un ministro de Hacienda ejemplar" (PDF). Anales de la Real Academia de Ciencias Morales y Políticas (in Spanish). 1. Royal Academy of Moral and Political Sciences: 637–675. ISSN 0210-4121.
