= Segismundo Moret =

Spanish politician and writer (1833–1913)

The Most Excellent Segismundo Moret
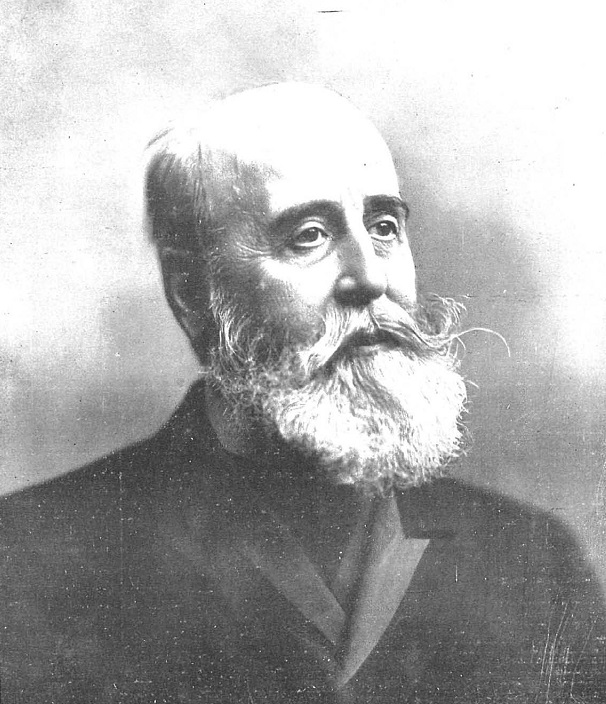
- Photograph by Kaulak

Prime Minister of Spain
- In office 1 December 1905 – 6 July 1906
- Monarch: Alfonso XIII
- Preceded by: Eugenio Montero Ríos
- Succeeded by: José López Domínguez
- In office 30 November 1906 – 4 December 1906
- Monarch: Alfonso XIII
- Preceded by: José López Domínguez
- Succeeded by: Antonio González de Aguilar
- In office 21 October 1909 – 9 February 1910
- Monarch: Alfonso XIII
- Preceded by: Antonio Maura
- Succeeded by: José Canalejas

Personal details
- Born: Segismundo Moret y Prendergast; 2 June 1833 Cádiz, Spain
- Died: 28 January 1913 (aged 79) Madrid, Spain
- Party: Progressive; Liberal Party

Segismundo Moret y Prendergast (2 June 1833 – 28 January 1913) was a Spanish politician and writer. He was the prime minister of Spain on three occasions and the president of the Congress of Deputies on two occasions.

== Biography ==
Moret was born in Cádiz on 2 June 1833. His mother's family, the Prendergasts, were of Irish descent. He studied at the Universidad Central in Madrid, where, in 1858, he became professor of political economy while he continued his studies in jurisprudence.

In 1863, Moret was elected representative to parliament as an independent representing the town of Almadén in the province of Ciudad Real. He was re-elected in 1868 after the Revolution of 1868 and took part in the writing of the new Spanish Constitution of 1869. He was noted for his eloquence.

As Minister of Overseas in the government presided by General Prim in 1870, Moret, himself a member of the Spanish Abolitionist Society, pushed for the abolition of slavery and the creation of a constitution for Puerto Rico. In 1871, he was Minister of the Treasury (hacienda) in the first government of King Amadeo I, and in 1872, he was appointed ambassador in London but resigned months later months and accepted a directorship in a large British bank.

With the restoration of the Bourbon dynasty to the Spanish throne in 1875, Moret returned to Spain, where he founded the Partido Democrático-Monárquico party. He was again elected deputy for Ciudad Real in 1879 and rallied to the monarchy in 1882. In 1883, he was appointed Minister of the Interior (Gobernación), and after 1885, he joined the Liberal Party in which he cooperated with Práxedes Mateo Sagasta as Minister of State (estado, foreign affairs, 1885–1888), Interior (Gobernación, 1888, 1901, 1902), Development (Fomento) (1892), State (Estado, foreign affairs, 1892, 1894) and Overseas Colonies (Ultramar, 1897–1898). When Sagasta died, he participated in the quarrels for the control of the party.

In 1897, as Minister for Overseas Colonies (Ultramar), Moret decreed the autonomy for Cuba and Puerto Rico. He opposed the war against the United States in 1898. In 1902, he collaborated in the creation of the Institute of Social Reform, which was a precursor of the future Ministry of Labour.

In 1905, after the resignation of Montero Rios, Moret became prime minister but was forced to resign in July 1906 after he had lost his majority in the parliament (Cortes Generales) although he became again prime minister briefly the same year (30 November – 4 December).

After the bloody confrontations of the "Tragic Week" in 1909 in Barcelona, Moret was again appointed prime minister after the resignation of Antonio Maura while he was also Minister of the Interior. He was forced to resign in February 1910 when he was replaced by José Canalejas. He denounced the Canalejas Ministry as "a democratic flag being used to cover reactionary merchandise".

In 1912, after the assassination of Prime Minister Canalejas and the appointment of a new prime minister, Álvaro Figueroa Torres, Count of Romanones, Moret was elected as the 155th president of the Congress of Deputies, which he was until his death, on 28 January 1913. It was his second term as speaker of the Spanish lower house; from July 15, 1901 to April 3, 1902, he had served as the 147th speaker.

== See also ==
- List of prime ministers of Spain
- Monument to Moret (Cádiz)
- Reign of Alfonso XIII of Spain

Political offices
Preceded by	Representative for Almadén; 1863–1868	Succeeded by
Preceded by Manuel Becerra Bermúdez	Minister of Overseas; 1870	Succeeded by Adelardo López de Ayala
Preceded by Laureano Figuerola	Minister of Finance; 1870–1871	Succeeded by Servando Ruiz Gómez
Preceded by Manuel Rancés y Villanueva	Ambassador to London; 1872–1875	Succeeded by Manuel Rancés y Villanueva
Preceded by Pío Gullón e Iglesias	Minister of the Governation; 1883–1884	Succeeded by Francisco Romero Robledo
Preceded by José de Elduayen	Minister of State; 27 November 1885 – 14 June 1888	Succeeded by Marquis of Vega de Armijo
Preceded by José Luis Albareda	Minister of the Governation; 1888	Succeeded by Trinitario Ruiz Capdepón
Preceded by Aureliano Linares Rivas	Minister of Development; 1892	Succeeded by Alejandro Groizard
Preceded by Marquis of Vega de Armijo	Minister of State; 5 April 1893 – 4 November 1894	Succeeded by Alejandro Groizard
Preceded by Tomás Castellano y Villarroya	Minister of Overseas; 1897–1898	Succeeded by Vicente Romero Girón
Preceded by Francisco Javier Ugarte Pagés	Minister of the Governation; 1901–1902	Succeeded by Alfonso González Lozano
Preceded by Eugenio Montero Ríos	Prime Minister; 1905	Succeeded by José López Domínguez
Preceded by José López Domínguez	Prime Minister; 1906	Succeeded by Antonio Aguilar Correa
Preceded by Antonio Maura y Montaner	Prime Minister; 1909–1910	Succeeded by José Canalejas
Cultural offices
Preceded by Antonio Cánovas del Castillo	President of the Ateneo de Madrid; 1884–1886	Succeeded by Gaspar Núñez de Arce
Preceded by Gumersindo de Azcárate	President of the Ateneo de Madrid; 1894–1898	Succeeded by José Echegaray
Preceded by José Echegaray	President of the Ateneo de Madrid; 1899–1913	Succeeded by Rafael María de Labra
