= Eugenio Montero Ríos =

Spanish politician (1832–1914)

The Most Excellent Eugenio Montero Ríos
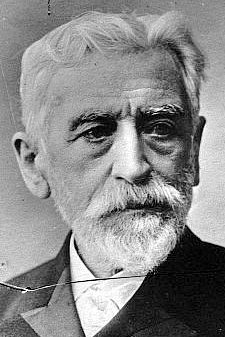

Prime Minister of Spain
- In office 23 June 1905 – 1 December 1905
- Monarch: Alfonso XIII
- Preceded by: Raimundo Fernández-Villaverde
- Succeeded by: Segismundo Moret

Personal details
- Born: Eugenio Montero Ríos

Eugenio Montero Ríos (13 November 1832, in Santiago de Compostela – 12 May 1914, in Madrid) was a leading member of the Spanish Liberal Party before being part of a 1903 schism that divided it. He also served briefly as Prime Minister of Spain. He played a role in the 1898 Treaty of Paris that ended the Spanish–American War as he was then President of the Senate of Spain.

== Ideology ==
Montero Ríos represents in some way the liberal elite of the political clique that dominated Galicia during the Restoration. He was the head of a large, bloodline, and political family formed by his uncles (Benito Calderón Ozores, Manuel García Prieto) and sons (Eugenio and Andrés Avelino Montero Villegas) with connections in all four provinces. The interests organized around this politician covered a significant part of Galicia at the beginning of the 20th century. To his residence in Lourizán, province of Pontevedra, politicians, journalists, and notable figures of the time would come as if it were a political mecca.

== See also ==
=== Related articles ===
- Gran Vía de Montero Ríos
