= Political system of the Restoration (Spain) =

Spaniard system during Restoration

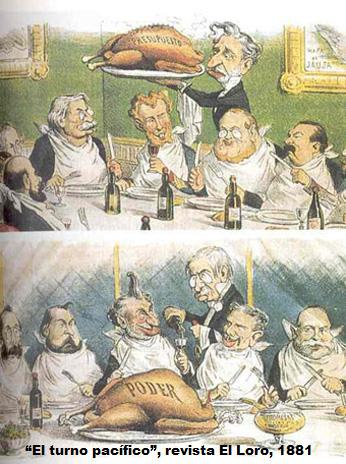
Cartoon by El Loro (1881) on the “turno pacífico” between the two major parties of the Restoration: the conservatives and the liberals. At the top, the liberal leader Sagastaa serves the conservative government presided over by Cánovas. At the bottom, Cánovas does the same with the liberal government led by Sagasta.

The political system of the Restoration was the system in force in Spain during the period of the Restoration, between the promulgation of the Constitution of 1876 and the coup d’état of 1923 that established the dictatorship of Primo de Rivera. Its form of government was that of a constitutional monarchy, but it was neither democratic nor parliamentary, "although it was far from the one-party exclusivism of the Isabelline era." The regime "was defined as liberal by its supporters and as oligarchic by its detractors, particularly the regenerationists. Its theoretical foundations are found in the principles of doctrinaire liberalism," emphasizes Ramón Villares.

The political regime of the Restoration was implemented during the brief reign of Alfonso XII (1874-1885), which constituted "a new starting point for the liberal regime in Spain."

Its main characteristic was the gap between, on the one hand, the Constitution and the laws that accompanied it and, on the other, the actual functioning of the system. On the surface, it appeared to be a parliamentary regime, similar to the British model, in which the two major parties, Conservative and Liberal, alternated in government based on electoral results that determined parliamentary majorities, where the Crown played a representative role and had only symbolic power. In Spain, however, it was not the citizens with voting rights—men over the age of 25 as of 1890—who decided, but rather the Crown, "advised" by the ruling elite, which determined the alternation (the so-called turno) between the two major parties, Conservative and Liberal. Once the decree for the dissolution of the Cortes was obtained—a power exclusive to the Crown—the newly appointed Prime Minister would call elections to "manufacture" a comfortable parliamentary majority through systematic electoral fraud, using the network of caciques (local political bosses) deployed throughout the country. Thus, following this method of gaining power, which "disrupted the logic of parliamentary practice," governments were formed before elections rather than as a result of them, and election results were often even published in advance in the press. As noted by Carmelo Romero Salvador, under the Restoration, "corruption and electoral fraud were not occasional anecdotes or isolated outgrowths of the system, but [resided] in its very essence, in its very being." This was already observed by contemporary foreign observers. The British ambassador reported to his government in 1895: "In Spain, elections are manipulated by the government; and for this reason, parliamentary majorities are not as decisive a factor as elsewhere."

In 1902, the regenerationist Joaquín Costa described "the current form of government in Spain" in terms of "oligarchy and caciquism," a characterization that was later adopted by much of the historiography on the Restoration.

The historian José Varela Ortega highlights that the "stability of the liberal regime," the "greatest achievement of the Restoration," was obtained through a conservative solution that did not disrupt "the political and social status quo" and that tolerated an "organized caciquism." The politicians of the Restoration "did not want to, did not dare to, or could not break the entire system by mobilizing public opinion," so that "the electorate found itself excluded as an instrument of political change, and the Crown took its place" as the arbiter of power alternations. This meant abandoning the progressive tradition of national sovereignty (the electorate as the arbiter of change) in favor of placing sovereignty in "the Cortes alongside the King." However, by opting for a conservative rather than a democratic solution, the politicians of the Restoration "tied the fate of the monarchy to parties that did not depend on public opinion," which had profound long-term implications for the monarchy.

== A project by Cánovas del Castillo ==
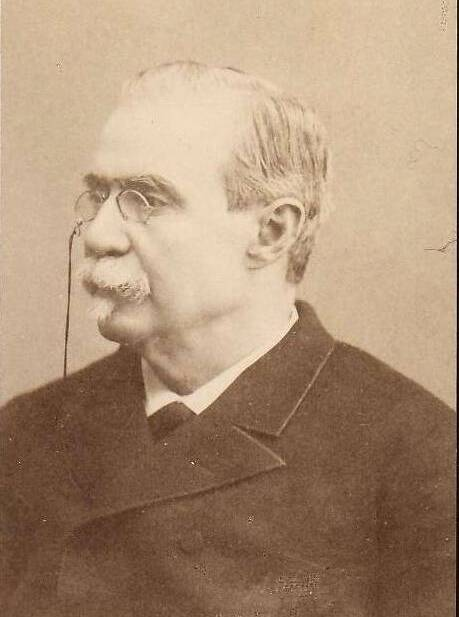
Antonio Canovas del Castillo. His political project formed the basis of the Restoration regime.

Unlike the Moderate Party, which sought a return to the situation before 1868, Cánovas was convinced that to avoid another failure, the monarchy had to be open to all liberal political sensibilities without being tied to a single party, as had been the case with the Moderates during Isabella II’s reign. For Cánovas, the limits of the political forces that should be excluded from the new monarchy were marked on the right by Carlism and the left by Republicanism:

I intend that no one ceases to be Alfonsine because of their background or political scruples, and for this, there must be at least two centers in each locality: one more conservative, where those whom impatience had made Carlists will find their place when they see that Carlism is the slowest and most difficult solution; and another more liberal, where all those disappointed by the revolution can take refuge. Only in this way can the broad framework be formed that a dynasty needs to make the monarchical institution solid and fruitful.

This project was expressed in the Sandhurst Manifesto, made public on December 1, 1874, by Prince Alfonso de Bourbon and carefully drafted by Cánovas. Feliciano Montero highlights that the Manifesto constitutes "perhaps the best synthesis of Cánovas' project for Alfonsine restoration," "a perfect synthesis of the guiding principles of the new regime," which he summarizes in four points: "to fill the political and legal vacuum that had de facto developed during the Six years through dynastic legitimacy"; "to reconcile, pacify, seek avenues of compromise, to make room for as many positions as possible"; "a national sovereignty shared between the King and the Cortes"; and a "tolerant solution to the religious question" ("Whatever my fate, I will not cease to be a good Spaniard, nor, like all my ancestors, a good Catholic, nor, as a man of my time, truly liberal," was the Manifesto's concluding phrase).

Cánovas' intentions were confirmed when, on December 31, 1874, he formed the Regency Ministry following the triumph of the pronunciamiento of Sagunto, which had proclaimed Prince Alfonso as the new King of Spain “without combat or bloodshed,” and which the king confirmed upon his arrival in Madrid. Cánovas took care to include in his government not only his supporters but also two important politicians from the Sexenio, Francisco Romero Robledo, Minister of the Interior, and Adelardo López de Ayala, Minister of Overseas Territories, as well as a "Septembrist" military officer, General Jovellar, in charge of the War Ministry. The government also included a member of the Moderate Party, the Marquis of Orovio, who was given the Public Works Ministry. Other moderates refused the offer to join his government when they learned that well-known Septembrists would be part of it and when Cánovas further confirmed that he had no intention of restoring the Constitution of 1845. One of the most prominent moderates, Claudio Moyano, told him that he considered collaboration impossible "given the path that I presume you intend to follow."

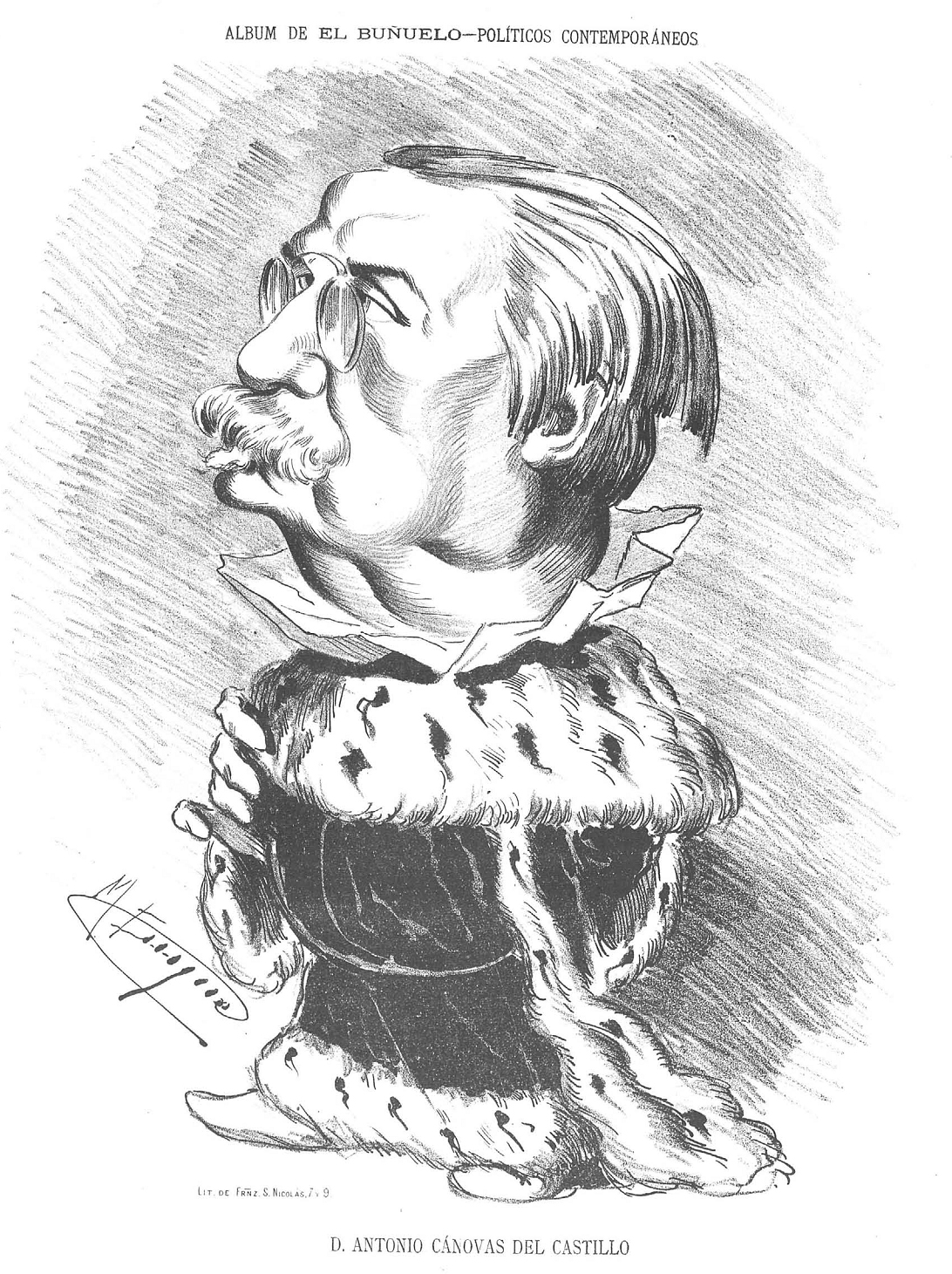
Caricature of the President of the Government and leader of the Conservative Party, Antonio Cánovas del Castillo, dressed in the royal ermine, a frequent accusation from his detractors: “Mr. Cánovas reigns and governs at the same time, even if he shows more taste for the former than for the latter,” declared an eminent liberal leader (satirical magazine El Buñuelo of February 10, 1881).

The fundamental objective of Cánovas’ political project—fully supported by King Alfonso XII—was to finally achieve the consolidation and stability of the liberal state, based on the constitutional monarchy defined in the Sandhurst Manifesto. To do so, he believed it was essential not to repeat the mistake that had led to the failure of Isabella II’s monarchy: the exclusive association of the Crown with one branch of liberalism (Moderantism), which forced the other (Progressivism) to resort to force (through pronunciamientos and juntismo) to gain power. Therefore, it was necessary to ensure that the different liberal factions could alternate in governance without endangering the system itself. Furthermore, if access to power was based on the turno pacífico between the two main liberal factions, the military would be relegated to its specific sphere, and civil society would regain its proper role. Thus, it was essential to demilitarize (civilize) political life and depoliticize the Army.

The main obstacle that Cánovas del Castillo encountered in carrying out his project did not come from the left but from the Moderate Party—“the reactionary section of the Alphonsine party,” as the British ambassador Layard called it—which sought to return to the pre-1868 Glorious Revolution situation, as if nothing had changed since then. Despite initially making significant concessions to the moderates, Cánovas, with the unwavering support of the monarch, refused to yield on their three main demands: the reinstatement of the 1845 Spanish Constitution—which had governed Isabella II’s monarchy—the restoration of “Catholic unity”—which would have resulted in the prohibition of all non-Catholic worship and granted the Church a monopoly over key social activities (birth, marriage, burial, and education)—and the immediate return of Queen Isabella II from her exile in Paris.

Of the moderates’ three demands, the most contentious proved to be the restoration of Catholic unity. Cánovas firmly opposed it, as he believed it would prevent the “revolutionaries of 1868” from supporting the new monarchy, thereby making it unviable in the long run. Additionally, it would isolate Spain internationally—religious tolerance, he declared, was “the means of convincing Europe that the Restoration did not signify a reaction.” The king gave him unwavering support. According to Feliciano Montero, Cánovas’ refusal to restore Catholic unity “became precisely the key to the dissolution of the moderates as a group and the definitive shaping of his political party, the Liberal-Conservative Party.” Fidel Gómez Ochoa shares this view—stating that this was “the reason why the moderates saw the Restoration as incomplete and their trust undermined.” However, he also points to the introduction of universal suffrage for the first elections, which a prominent moderate rejected in a letter to the king, arguing that it “called into question His Majesty’s legitimate right to the throne.”

On the other hand, Cánovas did not believe in democracy and always opposed universal suffrage. When it was finally approved in June 1890 at the proposal of Sagasta’s liberal government, he stated that its “sincere” application, “if it gives a true vote in the government of the country to the masses, not only uneducated—which would be the least serious—but [to] the miserable and begging masses,” “this would mean the triumph of communism and the ruin of the principle of property.”

== Legal framework: The Constitution of 1876 ==
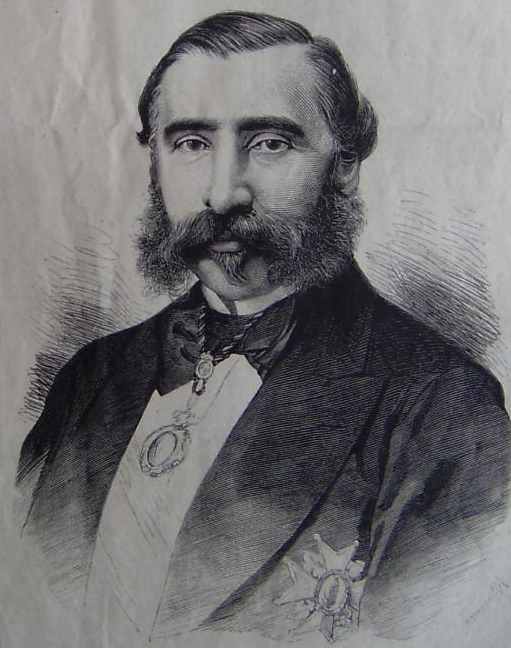
Manuel Alonso Martínez, leader of the Constitutional Party, joined Cánovas's project to approve a new Constitution, abandoning the demand for the text of 1869. His supporters were called centralists after the group they formed: the Parliamentary Center.

The Constitution of 1876 was a kind of synthesis of that of 1845—moderate—and that of 1869—democratic— but with a strong predominance of the former, as it included its fundamental doctrinal principle: the shared sovereignty of the Cortes with the king, to the detriment of the principle of national sovereignty on which the 1869 Constitution was based.

The principle of shared sovereignty between the King and the Cortes stemmed from the idea that “the monarchy in Spain was not merely a form of government but the very core of the Spanish state. That is why Cánovas suggested to the Commission of Notables that, in its opinion [on the draft Constitution], it propose the exclusion of the titles and articles referring to the Monarchy from examination and debate in the Cortes. Thus, the monarchy was placed above both ordinary and constitutional legislative determinations.” In Cánovas’ view, the monarchy was the ultimate representation of sovereignty but also the symbol of legality and permanence above partisan struggles.

It retained from the Constitution of 1869 its broad declaration of individual rights but recognized them with restrictions, allowing for their limitation or even suspension through ordinary laws. The most contentious issues were avoided by adopting ambiguous wording and leaving their determination to future laws, enabling each party—conservative or liberal—to govern according to its principles without the need to modify the Constitution.

This was the case with suffrage, as the electoral law was responsible for determining whether it would be restricted—as the moderates and Cánovas' supporters wanted—or universal—as advocated by Sagasta’s “revolutionary” constitutionalists. However, regardless of the law—whether the 1878 law, which reinstated restricted suffrage and limited the right to vote to around 850,000 citizens, or the 1890 law, which definitively restored universal (male) suffrage, allowing more than 4,500,000 people to vote—the elections of the Restoration were marked by massive fraud. Governments were formed before elections, then called them, and always secured a comfortable majority in the Congress of Deputies.

Another contentious issue was the composition of the Senate, the upper house of the Restoration’s Cortes, which had the same powers as the Congress. It was decided that half of the 360 senators would serve for life by “own right” (navy admirals, army captains general, and grandees of Spain) or be appointed by the king (on the government’s proposal); the other half would be elected for a five-year term by various civil, political, and religious corporations, as well as by the highest taxpayers in each province, through indirect suffrage.

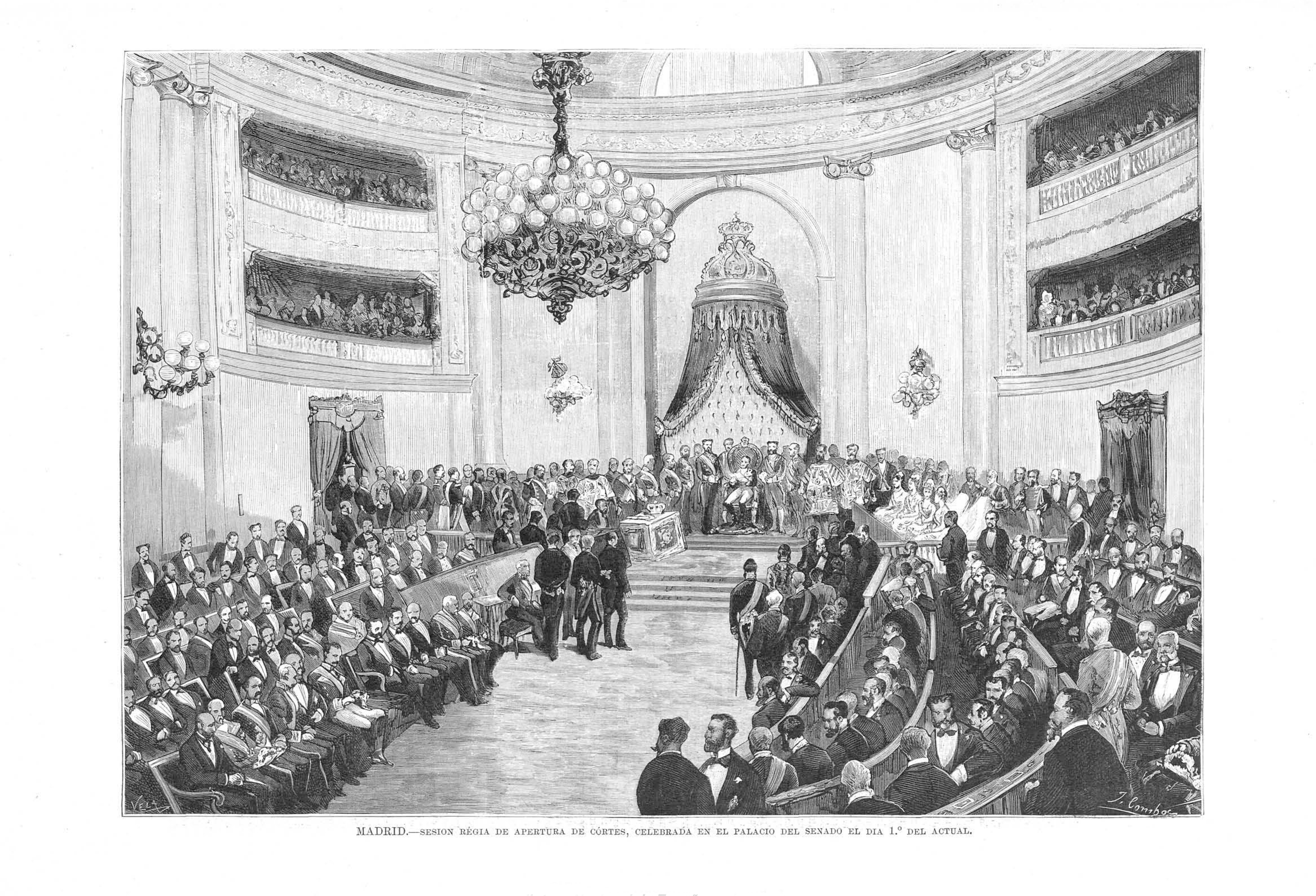
Opening session of the Cortes celebrated at the Palace of the Senate on July 1st, 1878 (La Ilustración Española y Americana, July 8, 1878).

Regarding deputies, Article 30 established that they would be elected for a five-year term, although in practice, no legislature reached its full term—only the “long Parliament” of the liberals from 1885 to 1890 nearly completed its mandate. The average duration of a legislature was just over two years. The Constitution did not establish the duration of parliamentary sessions, so, as would frequently and arbitrarily happen during the reign of Alfonso XIII, governments could suspend them.

The most controversial issue was undoubtedly religion. The freedom of worship recognized in the Spanish Constitution of 1869 was abolished, but Cánovas had to use all his authority to ensure that Catholic unity was not reinstated (as it had been in the 1845 Constitution). The 1876 Constitution affirmed the confessional (Catholic) character of the State while simultaneously establishing tolerance for other religions, allowing their private practice. The Catholic Church ultimately accepted this new situation because it believed that subsequent organic laws would respect its interests—which indeed happened, as the Spanish Primate Cardinal acknowledged years later: “Article 11 of the Constitution protected Catholic interests more effectively than a prohibitive provision.”

== Functioning of the system ==
The main characteristic of the Restoration regime was the gap between, on the one hand, the Constitution and the laws that developed it (the “legal country”) and, on the other, the actual functioning of the system (the “real country”). On the surface, it appeared to be a parliamentary system similar to the British one, in which the two major parties, Conservative and Liberal, alternated in government based on electoral results that determined parliamentary majorities, while the Crown’s power was merely symbolic and representative. However, in Spain—unlike in the United Kingdom—it was not the voting citizens who decided (after 1890, men over 25) but the Crown, “advised” by the political elite, which determined the alternation (the turno) between the two major parties. Once the decree dissolving the Cortes was obtained—a power exclusively held by the Crown—the newly appointed Prime Minister would call elections to “manufacture” a comfortable parliamentary majority through systematic electoral fraud, using a network of local power brokers (caciques) across the country. Thus, under this system—which “upended the logic of parliamentary practice”—governments changed before elections rather than as a result of them. In 1902, the regenerationist Joaquín Costa defined “the current form of government in Spain” as an “oligarchy and caciquism,” a characterization that much of the historiography of the Restoration would later adopt. Costa was not the first to denounce the corruption and fraud upon which the regime was based. Others had done so before him, such as the Republican Gumersindo de Azcárate, who published El régimen parlamentario en la práctica in 1885.

José María Jover also emphasized the duality between the “formal constitution and the actual functioning of political life” as a fundamental characteristic of the Restoration regime, noting that “any historical analysis of the 1876 Constitution must begin with the fact that the political dynamic envisaged in its articles—the decisive role of the electorate, parliamentary majorities that theoretically share with the king the function of maintaining or overturning governments—not only did not develop in practice as formally envisioned, but its own architects had already anticipated this discrepancy between the letter of the Constitution and the reality of its application.” Similarly, Carlos Dardé argued that this duality—between the “formal constitution and the actual functioning of political life”—allowed parties in power to implement their projects while also controlling the budget and public administration jobs, which they used to reward their supporters, who might share their ideology but also sought material benefits.

=== The king as arbiter between parties: The “royal prerogative” ===
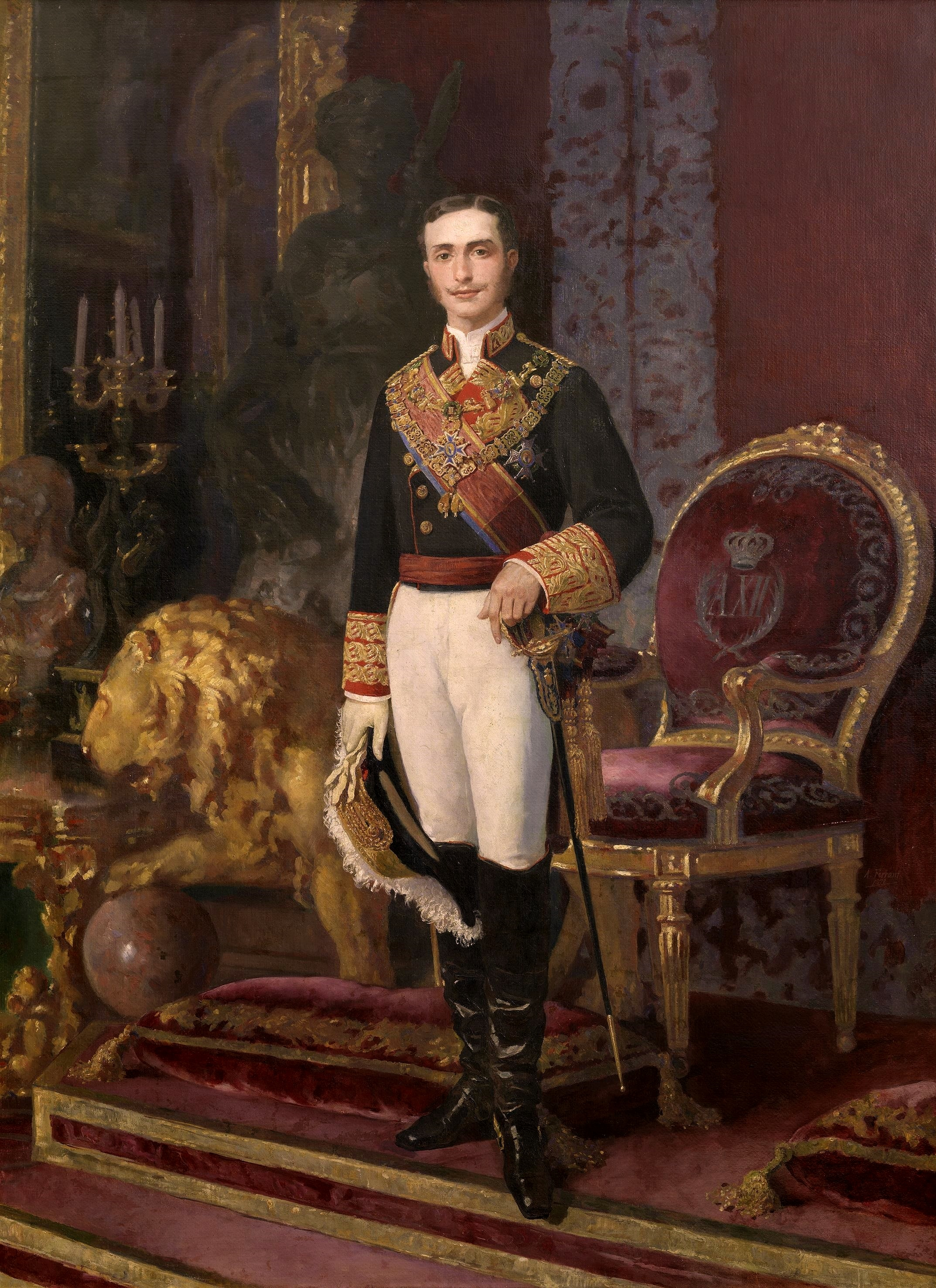
Portrait of Alphonse XII near the throne and one of the two lions of the Palace of the Cortes by Alejandro Ferrant y Fischermans (circa 1875).

For Cánovas del Castillo, the events of Queen Isabella II’s reign and the Democratic Sexennium demonstrated that public opinion did not determine which political option should hold power, since it was the governments that “created” the parliamentary majorities they needed to govern, rather than the elections. The proof was that governments, regardless of their ideology, always won elections. “If there is one area where we have an evident inferiority compared to all other constitutional nations, it is in the strength, independence, and initiative of the electorate,” Cánovas declared. “Here, the government has been the great corrupter. The electorate, to a large extent, [...] is nothing more than a mass that moves according to the will of the government.” Other politicians shared this view, such as the centralist Manuel Alonso Martínez: “The electorate is completely absent in Spain today. [...] There is nothing more unequal in Spain than the struggle of the voter against the government; power, which holds immense resources, is generally generous with the friendly voter while being unjust and even cruel to the opposition voter.” Even Sagasta’s constitutionalists acknowledged the problem. His newspaper, La Iberia, published in March 1877: “Can anyone deny that our customs are flawed? [...] Has any government ever been defeated in an electoral contest? [...] None. This proves that we lack [...] good practices and moderation, temperance, and impartiality in governance.”

Thus, according to Cánovas, another instrument was necessary to guarantee the alternation of the two major liberal political options, and that instrument had to be the Crown. “It is the king who must alternately call upon one party or the other so that there are no political outcasts who, as happened during Isabella II’s reign, would resort to military barracks to achieve what was denied to them peacefully.”

The Crown thus became the “moderating power,” ensuring that governments did not remain in power indefinitely even after losing the confidence of “public opinion”—the opinion of voters—through the mechanisms they had at their disposal to rig elections. The king would therefore be the one to determine government changes based on his interpretation of shifts he detected in “opinion.” Ultimately, for Cánovas, the Crown was the only possible guarantor of “national sovereignty” given the political dependence of civil society as a whole. “The king does not rely on the opinion of the electorate, expressed through parliamentary majorities, to appoint a government. Rather, the opposite occurs: the king appoints a head of government, who proposes ministers to the king, receives a decree of dissolution, and calls new elections, negotiating their outcomes with various political forces (encasillado) capable of mobilizing their respective clienteles. In this way, ‘elections are organized’ that inevitably produce comfortable majorities for the government that calls them.”

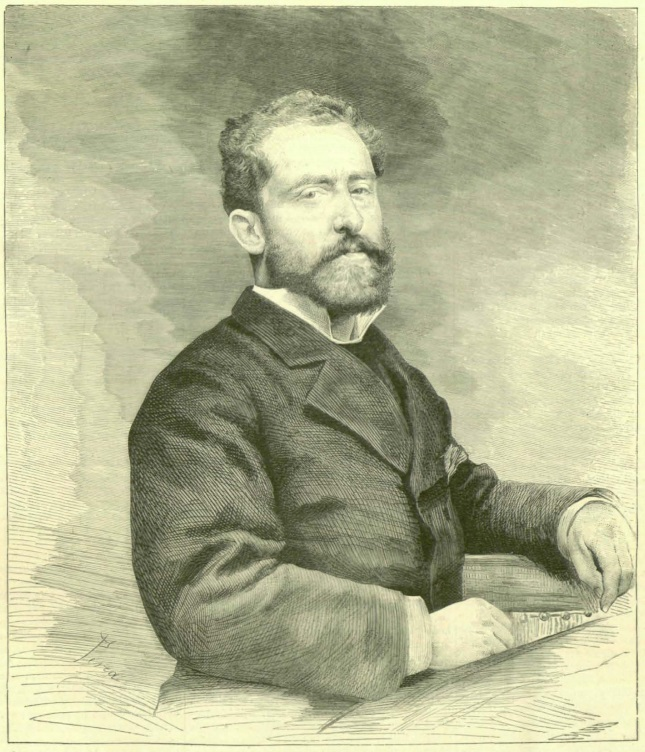
Francisco Romero Robledo, a “Septembrist” who “turned coat” and joined the Cánovas project. As Minister of the Interior, he distinguished himself through his electoral “maneuvers” to guarantee an overwhelming majority for the Cánovas government, thus inaugurating one of the defining characteristics of the Restoration regime: electoral fraud.

Therefore, as Carlos Dardé highlights, “the king was responsible for the practical exercise of sovereignty, as he was the one who granted power to a party, which then held elections in which it always secured victory. This royal prerogative—the authority to form a government, along with the decree dissolving the existing Cortes and calling for new elections—was considered ‘the royal prerogative’ par excellence. And in reality, it was.” “Given the government’s practice of using all state resources to secure electoral victories, the monarch became the cornerstone of the system.” In 1883, British ambassador to Spain, Robert Morier, explained the situation to his government: “In this country, the final resort, the ultimate decision regarding the nation’s political fate, does not lie in electoral districts or the popular vote, but in another place not defined in the Constitution. De jure, and according to the constitutional text, the electorate is indeed the determining factor, as, while the king may appoint whomever he wishes to govern, that individual cannot rule without a parliamentary majority. However, the reality is that this majority does not result from the popular vote but from manipulations orchestrated by the Ministry of the Interior since the electoral machinery belongs entirely to that department. [For this reason], the goal of every party is to gain control of this ministry, and since the Crown can, constitutionally and whenever it desires, place this department in whichever hands it chooses, the crucial role assigned to the royal prerogative becomes immediately evident.”

As Ramón Villares highlights, the exercise of the "royal prerogative" was "fraught with difficulties to the point that the function of the monarch could be described as that of a 'pilot without a compass'—a figure endowed with enormous powers but lacking the necessary instruments to exercise them properly." José María Jover raised the same issue: "In the absence of genuine electoral indicators, what guide does the king follow in granting power to a particular leader or political party?" Following José Varela Ortega, Jover answered: "His ability to maintain 'party unity,' his capacity to consolidate his political sphere within the bipartisanship imposed by constitutional practice."

The principle of shared sovereignty between the king and the Cortes, as enshrined in the Constitution—Article 18 stated that "the power to make laws belongs to the Cortes with the King"—served as the legal facade for the Crown’s function of distributing power among parties. Thus, beyond being the ultimate representation of sovereignty—the symbol of legality and continuity above party struggles—the monarch was a key element in exercising that sovereignty. This granted the Crown extraordinary personal power—though not absolute, as it was limited by the Constitution and other political conventions. However, for Cánovas, this was justified by the absence of an electorate independent from government influence. "The monarchy among us must be a real and effective force, decisive, moderating, and guiding, because there is no other in the country," he declared. Liberal politician Manuel Alonso Martínez, a key ally of Cánovas in drafting the 1876 Constitution, echoed this sentiment: "The Moderating Power must replace certain functions that, in a normal and perfect representative regime, should be exercised by the electorate."

In summary, as historian Ramón Villares emphasizes, "the monarch held all the keys to the political system of the Restoration": governments needed the "double confidence" of both the Cortes and the King to function. The royal prerogative lay precisely in the Crown's ability to arbitrate political life. As Manuel Suárez Cortina noted, "Cánovas achieved an old objective: that the monarchy be real and effective, moderating and directing political life as long as there was no stable and mature electoral body to determine the course of government action."

On the other hand, the monarch—defined as a "soldier king," with powers established in the Constitution (Article 52: "He has the supreme command of the Army and Navy and controls land and naval forces"; Article 53: "He grants military ranks, promotions, and rewards according to the law") and reaffirmed by the 1878 Military Law, which granted him "exclusive" supreme command—also had the role of "civilizing" political life by curbing military interventionism. This aimed to prevent praetorianism and the caudillismo of certain generals. This objective of keeping the army out of politics was largely achieved, as evidenced by the minimal significance and failure of the few republican uprisings that occurred.

=== The alternation between the two major liberal parties: The turno ===
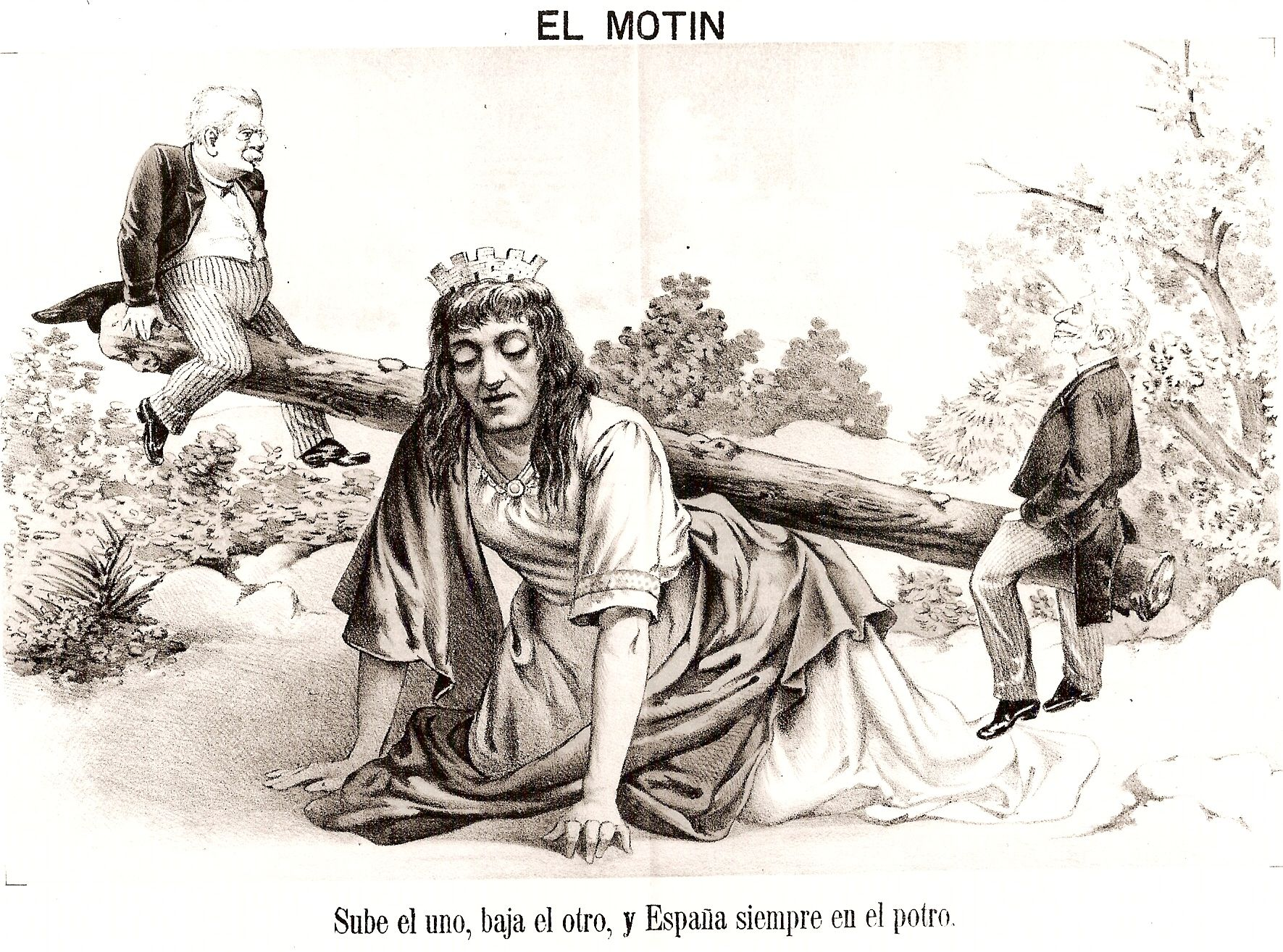
Cartoon by El Motín showing Cánovas and Sagasta swinging on a tree trunk placed on the back of an allegory of Spain.

Since access to power was not determined by elections but by the Crown's application of the royal prerogative, two alternating parties were sufficient to maintain the system: one representing a more conservative form of liberalism (the "right" of the system), and the other a more progressive variant (the "left"). These were the Liberal-Conservative Party, led by Cánovas himself, and the Liberal-Fusionist Party, led by Sagasta. Each sought to encompass all political tendencies within society, while those who rejected the constitutional monarchy (Carlists and Republicans) or opposed the principles of liberty and property that underpinned bourgeois society (socialists and anarchists) found themselves "self-excluded."

Since they did not need to seek public support through elections to access government, both parties remained, as under the Isabelline regime, parties of notables—dominated by a few individuals with stable electoral bases, whose primary arena of influence was Parliament.

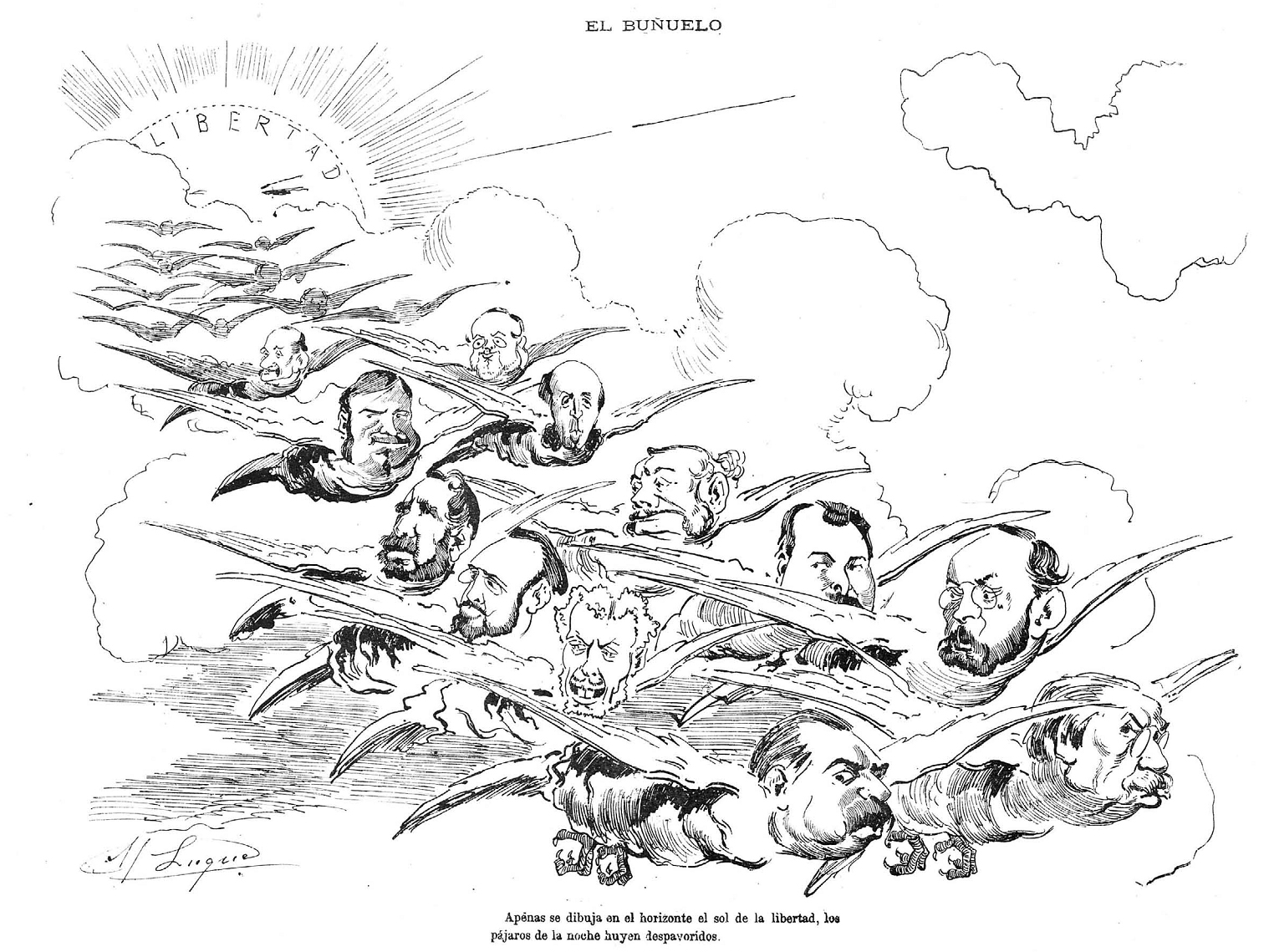
Caricature celebrating the Conservative Party's relinquishment of power, with Cánovas at the helm followed by his ministers (the birds of the night). The caption reads: “As soon as the sun of freedom appears on the horizon, the birds of the night flee in fear”. El Buñuelo satirical magazine, February 17, 1881.

The first alternation of power, a direct consequence of the prerogative real, took place in February 1881, when Sagasta’s Liberal-Fusionist Party assumed government after six years of predominantly Conservative rule under Cánovas. However, this transition was not the result of a formal agreement between Cánovas and Sagasta, as would later occur with the Pact of El Pardo in November 1885. Instead, it stemmed from "a personal decision by Alfonso XII, made without consultation and, likely, against the advice of Cánovas." As José Ramón Milán García highlights, "The arrival of the Fusionists to the government in February 1881 was undoubtedly one of the defining moments of Alfonso XII’s reign. Its significance was not lost on its protagonists, who recognized that the monarch’s initiative opened the door to overcoming the entrenched conflict between left-wing liberalism and the Bourbon dynasty. It also marked a step toward resolving the fratricidal struggles that had plagued different factions of Spanish liberalism for decades."

As Carlos Dardé points out, “What became clear in February 1881 was that the final interpreter of the state of affairs, and the one who had the power of decision—above the parliamentary majority and the head of government—was the monarch.” For this reason, as Ángeles Lario states, “This crisis was definitive in allowing Cánovas to see that rules had to be followed by both parties to avoid falling back into the danger of royal whims. […] The first thing he realized was the necessity of controlling the royal prerogative, regulating it, and giving it fixed criteria, far from personal considerations, achieving a balance between royal power and parliamentary power, with party leaders acting as the arbiters. […] The king should yield to public opinion as represented by the major parties. This had the opportunity to materialize due to the specific circumstances of the premature death of the king in 1885.”

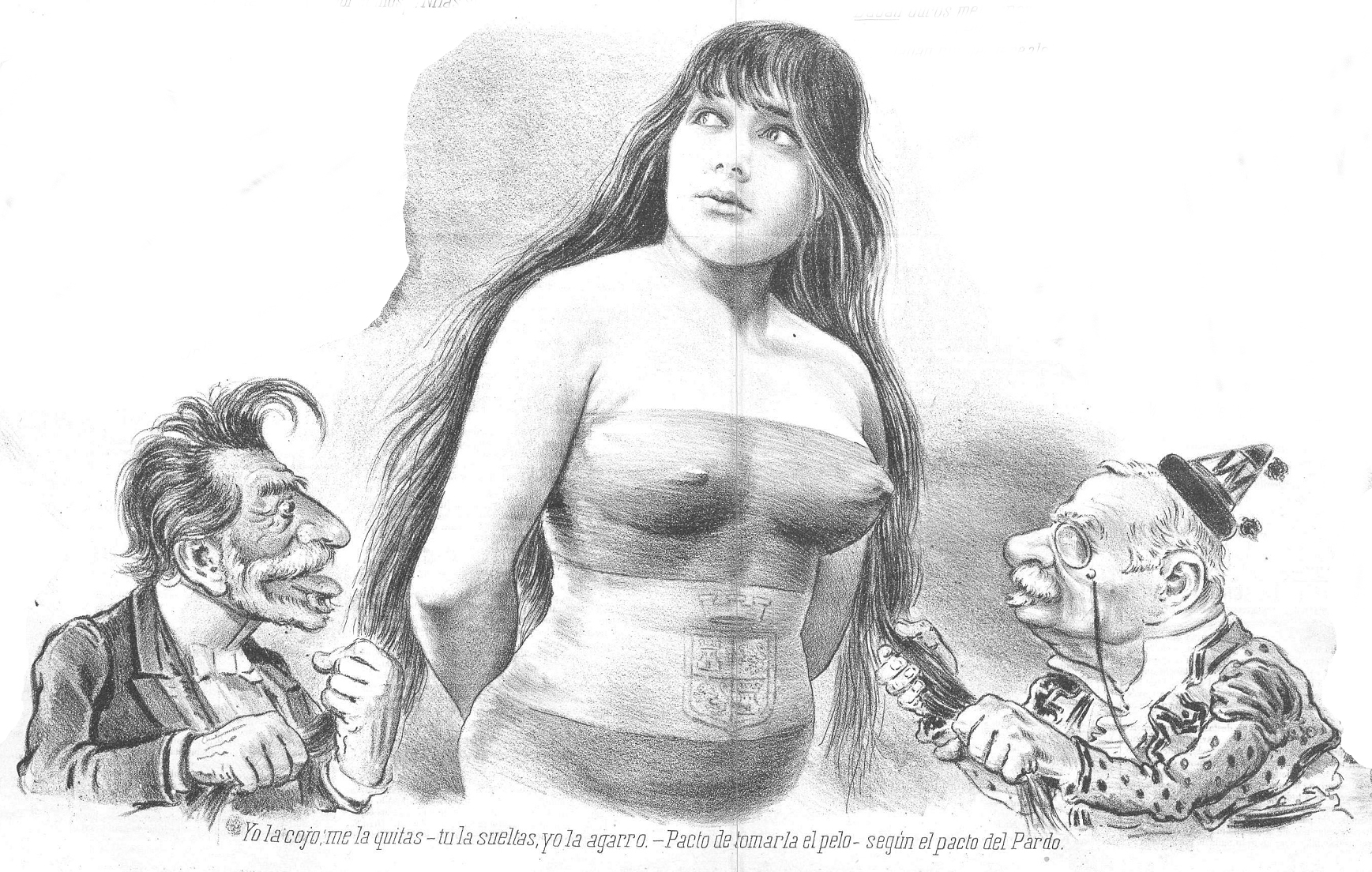
Caricature of Sagasta and Cánovas, expressly alluding to the Pact of El Pardo, in the Spanish satirical magazine Don Quijote, 1894.

In November 1885, faced with the prospect of a regency under the king’s young and inexperienced wife, María Cristina of Habsburg, who was pregnant (her son, a boy, would be born in May 1886), Cánovas, who was then head of government, decided to resign and advised the regent to call Sagasta to power. Cánovas communicated his decision to the liberal leader, who accepted it during a meeting held at the government headquarters, facilitated by General Martínez Campos, which would become known as the Pact of El Pardo. “An agreement by which the two parties decided to alternate power automatically in the following years.”

As Ramón Villares points out, “The death of King Alfonso XII and the memory of the 1885 pact (the improperly named Pact of El Pardo) definitively mark the consolidation of the Restoration regime.” Feliciano Montero observes that “The power vacuum created by the death of Alfonso XII put the solidity of the Canovist structure to the test. The accession of the Liberal Party to power, now definitively established, and its long period in government (the Long Parliament) contributed to consolidating the political system.”

For her part, Ángeles Lario notes that the political agreement reached upon the king’s death “made the two major parties the true directors of political life, consensually controlling the royal prerogative from top to bottom by constructing the necessary parliamentary majorities. This defined the character of this crucial period of our liberalism and was also the root of its greatest limitations. One might diagnose—if I may use the expression—that the political system of the Restoration suffered from the ailment caused by its success.”

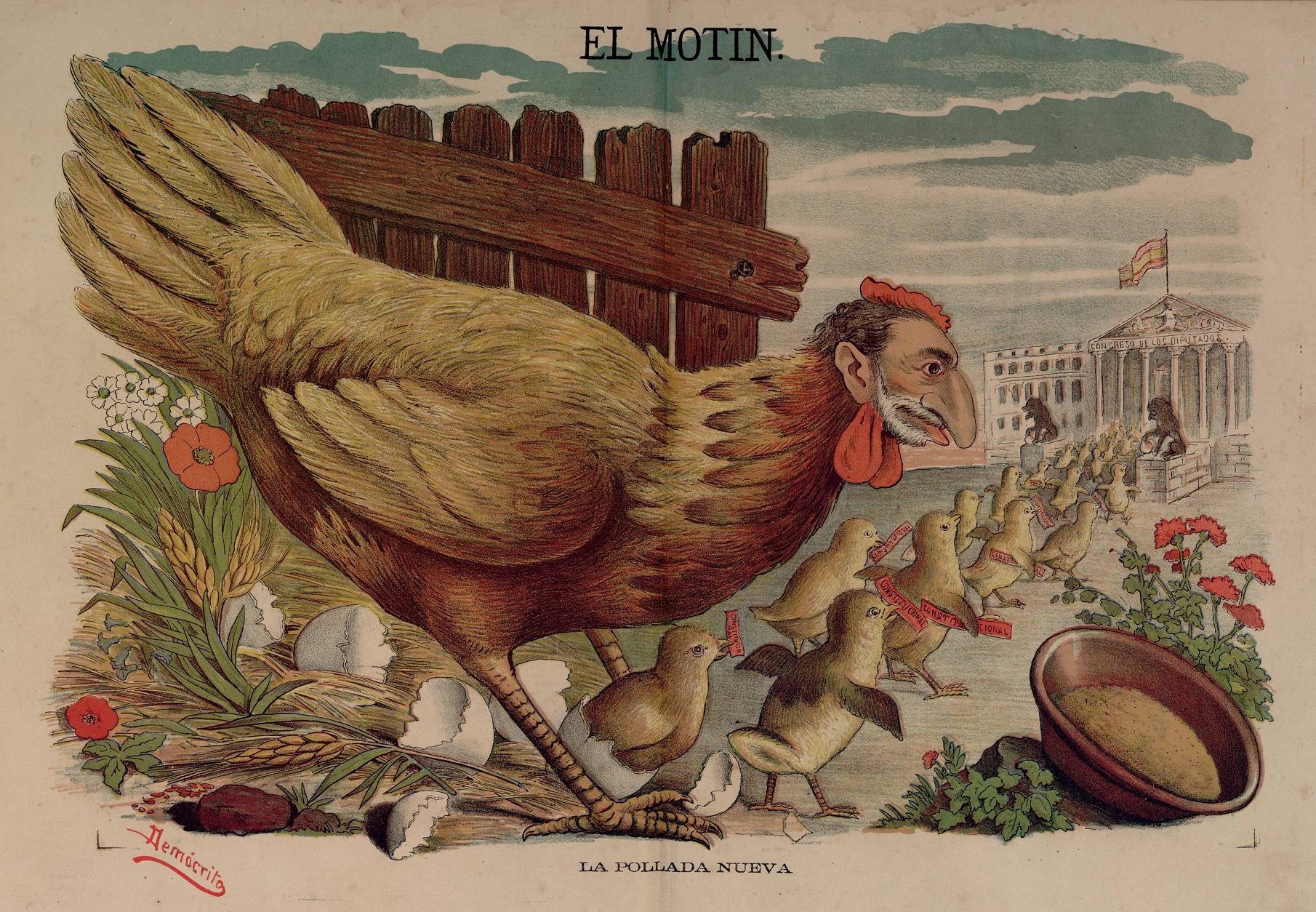
Cartoon by El Motín published in July 1881 under the title La pollada nueva. The liberal leader Sagasta is depicted as a mother hen laying eggs and leading her chicks to the Congress of Deputies. Sagasta had just 'manufactured' a comfortable majority in the Cortes after being appointed president of the government, thus initiating the 'turno de' with Cánovas' conservatives.

Manuel Suárez Cortina emphasizes that ensuring that “the monarchy was real and effective, moderating and directing political life”—Cánovas’s long-held goal—came at a price: “The permanent fraud with which elections were conducted in Restoration Spain. […] Political life was a fiction, where the true actors, the voters, were replaced by royal will, favoring a political rotation that stabilized the system but, in turn, distanced it from the national will. This was the method used by the conservative bourgeoisie after the political turmoil of the Democratic Sexenio.”

According to Carlos Dardé: “Agreeing that it was the king who alternated the distribution of power rendered pronunciamientos meaningless as a means of achieving it, but it also discouraged electoral competition. […] This did not eliminate competition between parties—for in exercising his role, the king had to consider each party’s social support—but it tended to weaken it and delay political mobilization. Worse still, it reinforced the clientelist nature of the parties; that is, favor and cronyism became the primary criteria in the distribution of the benefits of power rather than general, rational, and universal principles. Given that justice was also mediated by political power, ‘corruption and bribery had no other brake than individual morality,’ as Joaquín Romero Maura pointed out. The lack of moral legitimacy of the system eventually came at a high cost.” Alfonso XII had already privately admitted that he had completely failed in his ambition to “moralize the Spanish public administration” and that “the worst part was that all of this was seen with the greatest indifference.”

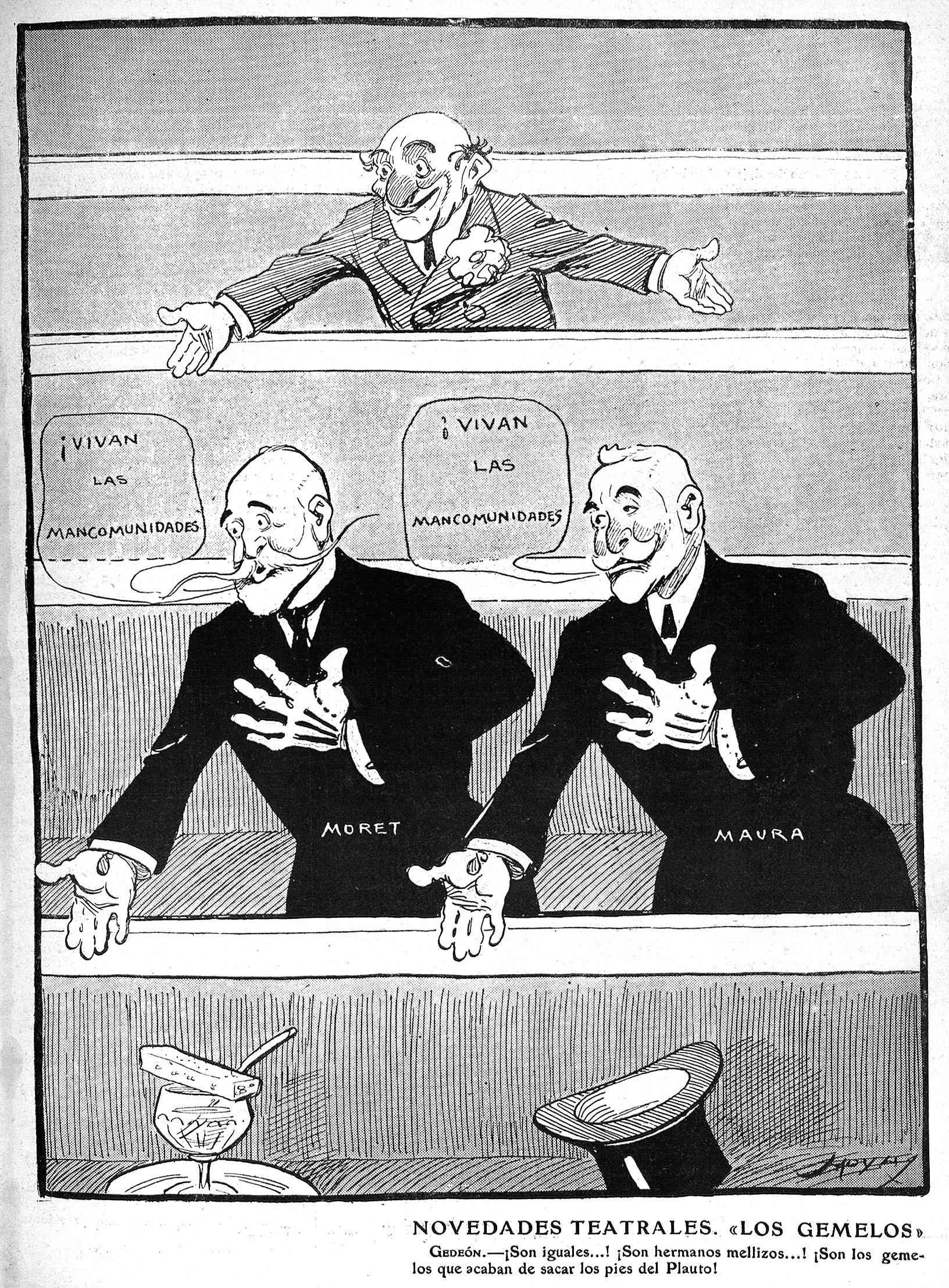
Cartoon of Segismundo Moret (liberal leader) and Antonio Maura (conservative leader), entitled “Theatrical news: ‘the twins’” (Gedeón, 1909). It criticizes the lack of political pluralism as a consequence of the “turno de factos”, since the two twin parties defend the same thing.

José Ramón Milán García particularly emphasized what happened with the Liberal Party: “The liberals fulfilled the essential mission for the king of gradually dismantling the revolutionary threat of republicanism by attracting, through their reforms, different factions and parties from this field, making a broad revolutionary coalition impossible. […] However, […] this accommodation to a political mechanism that favored their partisan needs had the perverse effect of diminishing their boldness and their willingness to sincerely reform a system that was based on a discriminatory and fraudulent interpretation of the laws, which contributed to its discredit and that of its political class.” José Varela Ortega highlights that “It was the liberals’ abandonment of the political principle of national or popular sovereignty that deprived the Liberal Party, and consequently the entire regime, of ideological substance. And thus, the non-ideological tendencies that characterized Spanish political parties—based on clientelism—were reinforced.” He also notes that the success of the Restoration, as evidenced by its long duration, was since Cánovas managed to “place the equilibrium point of the new regime to the left of the Moderate Party and the right of the Progressive Party.”

In short, both parties renounced ensuring that “elections were reasonably clean and that government was formed by Parliament and Parliament by the opinion of the electorate” and instead placed “electoral corruption” “at the service of the alternating profit of power.” As a result, for forty-four years, from 1879 to 1923, across twenty-one elections, the party that called them always won.

On the other hand, “The possibility of an agreement stemmed from the parallelism existing in the social bases—the propertied classes—of the two parties of the ‘liberal family.’ A parallelism that became more pronounced over time in its essential principles until both became indistinguishable on fundamental issues.” Some politicians could switch parties without posing an ideological problem, like Antonio Maura, who began in the Liberal Party and ended up leading the Conservative camp. When a cacique was criticized for supporting the liberals in some elections and the conservatives in others, he responded: “Me, change? I never change. The one who changes is the government. I am always with the one in power.”

Election results for the two dynastic parties during the Restoration (1876-1923)
		Deputies		
Date	Abstention (%)	Conservatives	Liberals	Others
January 23, 1876	45	333	27	31
April 20, 1879		293	56	43
August 20, 1881	29	39	297	56
April 27, 1884	28	318	31	43
April 4, 1886		56	278	58
February 1, 1891		253	74	72
March 5, 1893		44	281	75
April 12, 1896		269	88	44
March 27, 1898		68	266	67
April 16, 1899	35	222	93	76
May 18, 1901	33	79	233	89
April 26, 1903		234	102	67
September 10, 1905		115	229	60
April 21, 1907	33	252	69	83
May 8, 1918	17	102	219	83
March 8, 1914	24.7	188	85	135
April 9, 1916	20.3	88	230	91
February 24, 1918	20.3	98	92	91
June 1, 1919	20.3	93	52	91
December 18, 1920	20.3	185	40	91
April 29, 1923	20.3	81	203	91

=== Distortion of the system: "Oligarchy and caciquism" ===
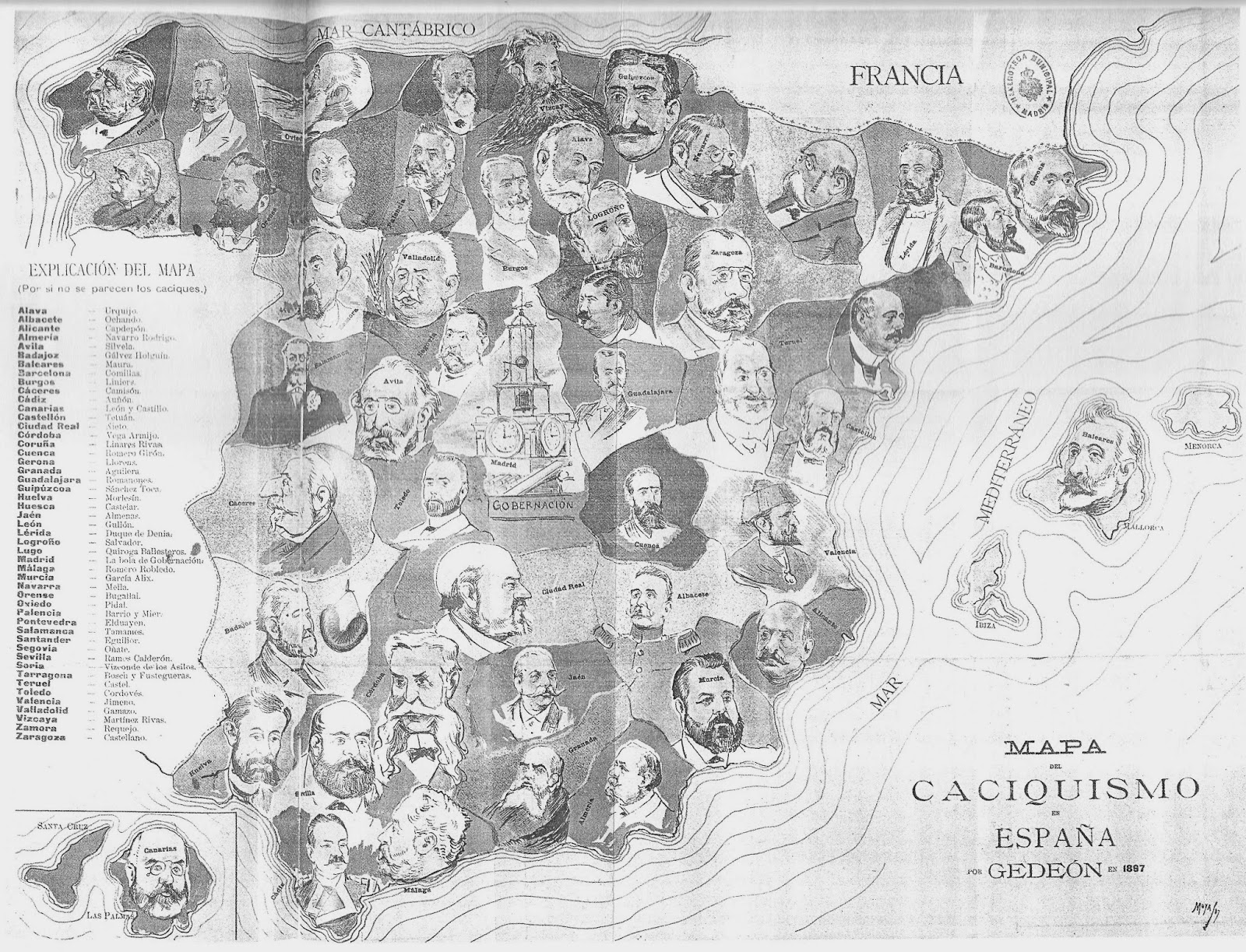
“Map of the caciquism in Spain”, by Moya (1897). The main deputies rooted in each province, those whose seat was not the subject of negotiations in the encasillado and who were the great caciques of the political regime of the Restoration.

Although the term caciquism was used early on to describe the political regime of the Restoration—by the general elections of 1891, which, as always, were won by the government that called them, people were already speaking of “the disgusting plague of caciquism”—its usage became widespread after the war of 1898. As early as 1898, the liberal Santiago Alba was already attributing Spain’s defeat to the “unbearable caciquism.” In 1901, the Madrid Athenaeum opened an inquiry-debate on Spain’s socio-political system, in which about sixty politicians and intellectuals participated. The report summarizing the discussion was written by the regenerationist Joaquín Costa and was titled Oligarchy and Caciquismo as the Current Form of Government in Spain. Urgency and Means of Change. In it, Costa stated that in Spain, “There is no Parliament nor parties, only oligarchies,” “a minority with no interest other than the personal interest of the same ruling minority.” This oligarchy, whose “upper ranks” were the primates (professional politicians based in Madrid, the center of power), was supported by a vast network of “caciques of the first, second, or third degree scattered throughout the territory.” The connection between the great caciques—the primates—and local caciques was ensured by the civil governors. Costa insisted in his report that “oligarchy and caciquism” were not exceptions within the system but rather “the rule, the system itself.” Virtually all participants in the inquiry debate agreed with this conclusion, and its influence continues to this day. More than a century later, “Costa’s binomial, which has become the title of books and history textbooks, remains the most commonly used framework for characterizing the Restoration period,” notes Carmelo Romero Salvador.

In the early 1970s, several historians (Joaquín Romero Maura, José Varela Ortega, and Javier Tusell) adopted a new perspective in their studies on caciquism—which, according to Manuel Suárez Cortina, is now dominant—highlighting its strictly political elements, understanding caciquism as a network of patron-client relationships. According to Suárez Cortina, “The most characteristic aspects of this interpretation emphasize the extra-economic nature of the patron-client relationship, the general demobilization of the electorate, the predominance of rural over urban components, the diversity of the nature of relationships and exchanges between patrons and clients depending on time and place; in short, the key features that dominate clientelist relationships.”

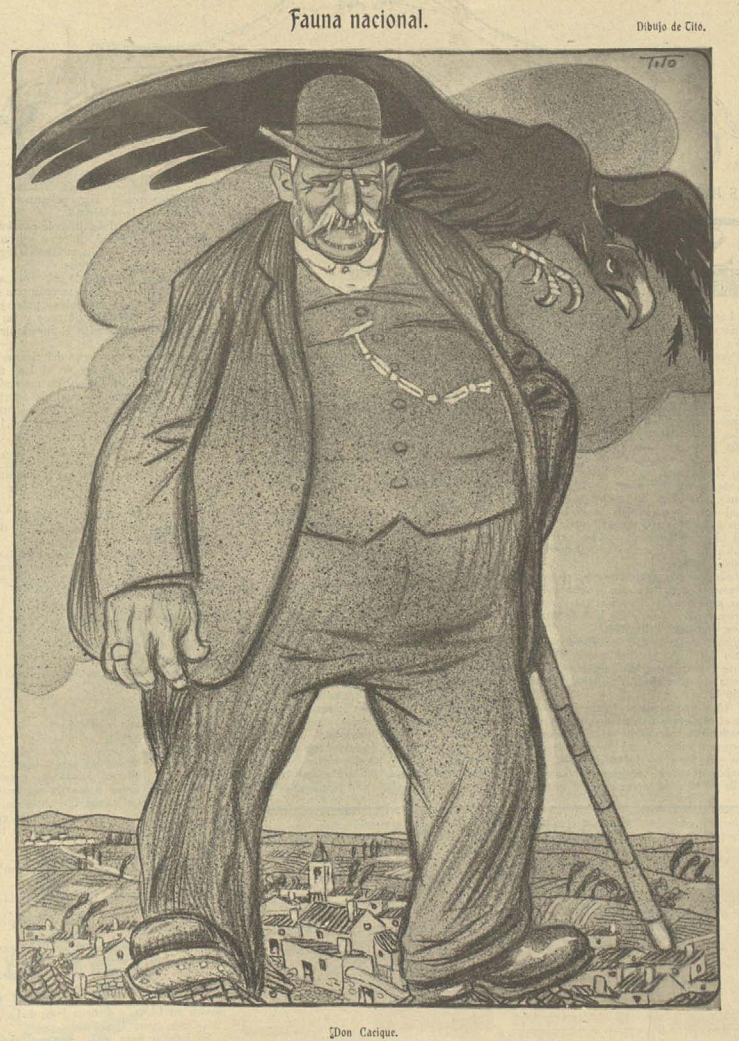
“Fauna nacional. Don Cacique”, by Tito (El Gran Bufón, 1913).

The fundamental function of the cacique, who typically holds no official position and is often not even a magnate, would be to “mediate” between the Administration and his “clients,” who are numerous and come from all social classes, and whose interests he systematically seeks to satisfy through illegal means—“caciquism feeds on illegality.” “The cacique, whether liberal or conservative, exerts influence in the locality derived from his control over administrative actions; this control is exercised by imposing illegal acts on the administration. The cacique’s immunity from government repercussions stems from the fact that he is the local leader of his party,” states Romero Maura, cited by Montero. His actions are summed up in the maxim: “The law applies to the enemy, and favor to the friend.”

Romero Maura summarizes the function of the cacique as follows:

The cacique distributes things that fall under the jurisdiction of the State, the provinces, and the municipality, and he distributes them at his discretion. Positions in these administrations permit them to build, open businesses, or practice professions, reductions or exemptions from various legal obligations—he has the power to grant all these things but also to harm his enemies and favor his friends. In some cases, a cacique with personal wealth may make concessions from his funds, but normally, what the cacique does is channel administrative favors. Caciquismo, therefore, thrives on illegality [...]. The cacique must ensure that an entire range of administrative and judicial decisions that are crucial to the lives of people in his locality are made according to extralegal criteria that he deems appropriate.

Feliciano Montero characterizes the cacique as "the intermediary between the central administration and the citizens," meaning that his influence is not limited to electoral periods—though it becomes most scandalous then—but is a constant presence in the country’s political life. "caciquism is, above all, the logical manifestation and expression of a social and political structure that manifests itself permanently and daily in interpersonal (patron-client) and politico-administrative relations." A judge from that time defined caciquism under the Restoration as "the personal regime exercised in villages [pueblos] by twisting or corrupting, through political influence, the functions of the State, in order to subordinate them to the selfish interests of specific factions or individuals." Thus, the key to the caciquil system "lay in controlling the administration." The liberal José Canalejas, referring in 1910 to a powerful cacique from Osuna, wrote in a letter to the conservative Antonio Maura that "they had nothing, absolutely nothing, other than the influence of high-ranking officials of all orders, who, by disobeying the government, committed all sorts of abuses." In summary: "the cacique is the local leader of a party who manipulates the administrative apparatus for his own benefit and that of his clientele."

Feliciano Montero emphasizes that "the oligarchic nature of the regime can be appreciated if one analyzes the close relationship between the political elite and the social and economic elites"—what historian Manuel Tuñón de Lara called the "power bloc," composed of large landowners, not all of whom were former nobles, and the upper financial, industrial, and commercial bourgeoisie. Thus, during the Restoration, it was very common to find the most prominent professional politicians (prime ministers, ministers, governors of the Bank of Spain) sitting on the boards of major companies (banks, railroads, mines, etc.).

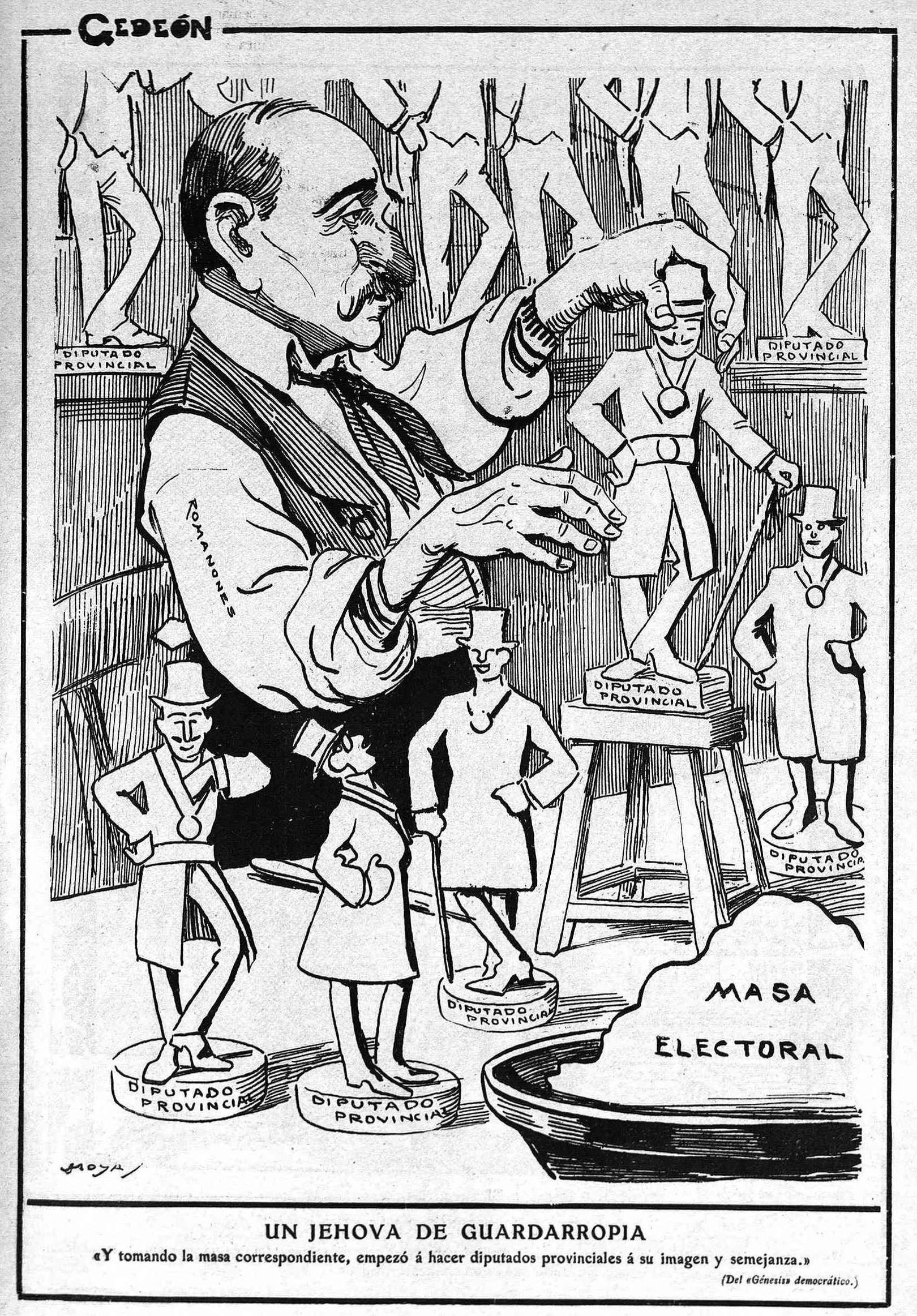
Satirical caricature of the Count of Romanones, who manufactured “provincial deputies in his own image and likeness” from the “electoral paste”, by Moya (Gedeón, 1911).

However, with few exceptions (mainly senators), the political elite—the professional politicians of the two major dynastic parties—did not come from the economic elite but rather from the middle classes (with a predominance of lawyers and, to a lesser extent, journalists). The two main parties can thus be described as parties of notables, although, according to historian Javier Tusell, they never fully became such, as party unity was not based on ideology or a program but on the clientelist networks of the factions that composed them, each hoping to be rewarded with positions once their party came to power. He estimates that there were between 50,000 and 100,000 positions that changed hands with each government turnover.

A politician’s career goal was to become a deputy—"General, make me a deputy, and as for becoming a minister, I’ll handle that myself," declared the young Antonio Cánovas del Castillo to General O'Donnell, the leader of his party, the Liberal Union—because reaching that position was the gateway to the highest offices (minister and prime minister). To achieve this, one had to be a "client" of an established and influential politician, so the essential condition for political advancement was loyalty to a patron, or a "deputy-maker," as Carmelo Romero Salvador puts it: "Deputy-makers, yes, because anyone aspiring to significant political influence could not merely obtain a seat and be a deputy, nothing more. He had to create his deputies, those who owed him their seats, and to do so, he had to have the power to make it happen. To a large extent, one went hand in hand with the other: the more deputies who owed him their seats, the greater his ability to continue producing more and thus expand his influence and power."

An important factor that explains this phenomenon is that deputies did not receive a salary until well into the 20th century. Their position was profitable "given the indirect benefits it could bring them." The first worker to enter the Restoration Parliament was the socialist Pablo Iglesias Posse in 1910—the previous one had been Pablo Alsina, fifty years earlier.

=== Mechanisms of electoral fraud ===
==== Electoral system ====
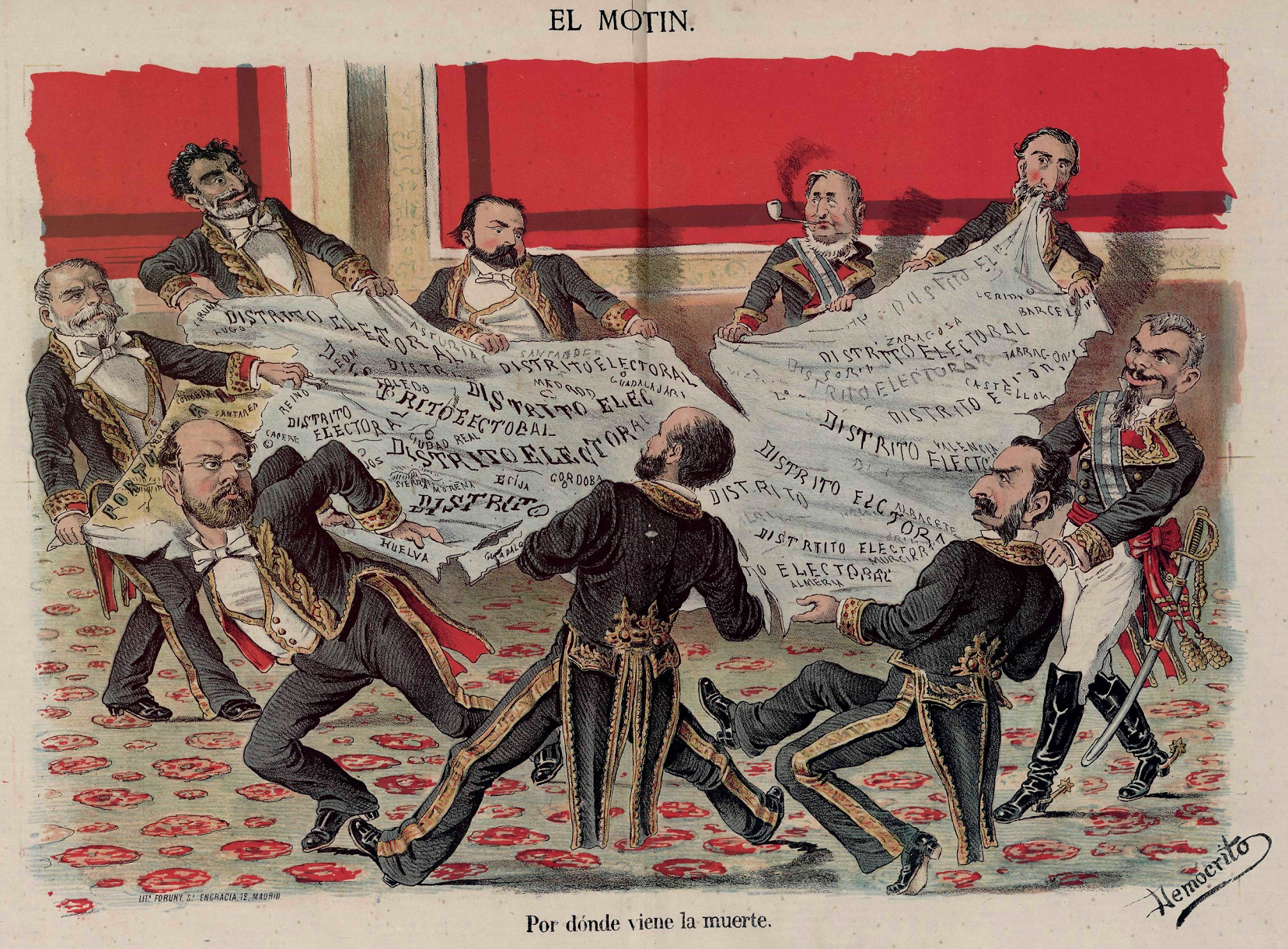
Cartoon by El Motín entitled D'où vient la mort (Where does death come from?). It depicts the dispute between members of the Sagasta government over the distribution of electoral constituencies. Starting from Sagasta (top left) and moving clockwise: Venancio González, Francisco de Paula Pavía y Pavía, Manuel Alonso Martínez, Arsenio Martínez Campos, the Marquis of la Vega de Armijo, José Luis Albareda, Fernando Leon y Castillo and Juan Francisco Camacho.

The electoral system of the Restoration was essentially established by the electoral law of 1878, though the 1890 law introduced a significant change by instituting universal (male) suffrage—the third electoral law of the period, from 1907, did not alter the system but rather simplified it, as the famous Article 29 stated that a candidate would be proclaimed elected without the need for a vote if they were the sole candidate running. The 1878 law determined—something that remained throughout the Restoration—that out of the roughly 400 deputies in Congress, more than three-quarters were elected in single-member districts (where the candidate with the most votes won the seat), while around a hundred were elected in 26 multi-member districts—24 in provincial capitals and two in major cities—where between 3 and 8 deputies (depending on the population of the district) were elected using a modified majoritarian system (voters could only select 80% of the available seats). The single-member districts made electoral fraud much easier—"the sources of age-old caciquism," as Carmelo Romero Salvador put it—as the Provisional Government of the Second Spanish Republic observed when, in its decree calling for elections to the Constituent Cortes in 1931, it opted for the province as the electoral district, because the single-member district "left wide open the door to caciquil coercion, vote-buying, and all known corruptions."

Most of the few deputies not belonging to the dynastic parties, particularly the Republicans and Socialists, were elected in multi-member constituencies because fraud was not as easy to implement there if voters were mobilized. This is what happened from 1901 onward in the Barcelona constituency, which had seven deputies to elect. From that year on, the turno parties no longer won any seats there—the Lliga Regionalista and the Republicans shared them—and from 1910 in Madrid, which had eight deputies, where the Republican-Socialist coalition won four of the next seven elections. Later, once the coalition broke up, the Socialists won the last election before the coup d’état of Primo de Rivera in September 1923.

==== Encasillado ====
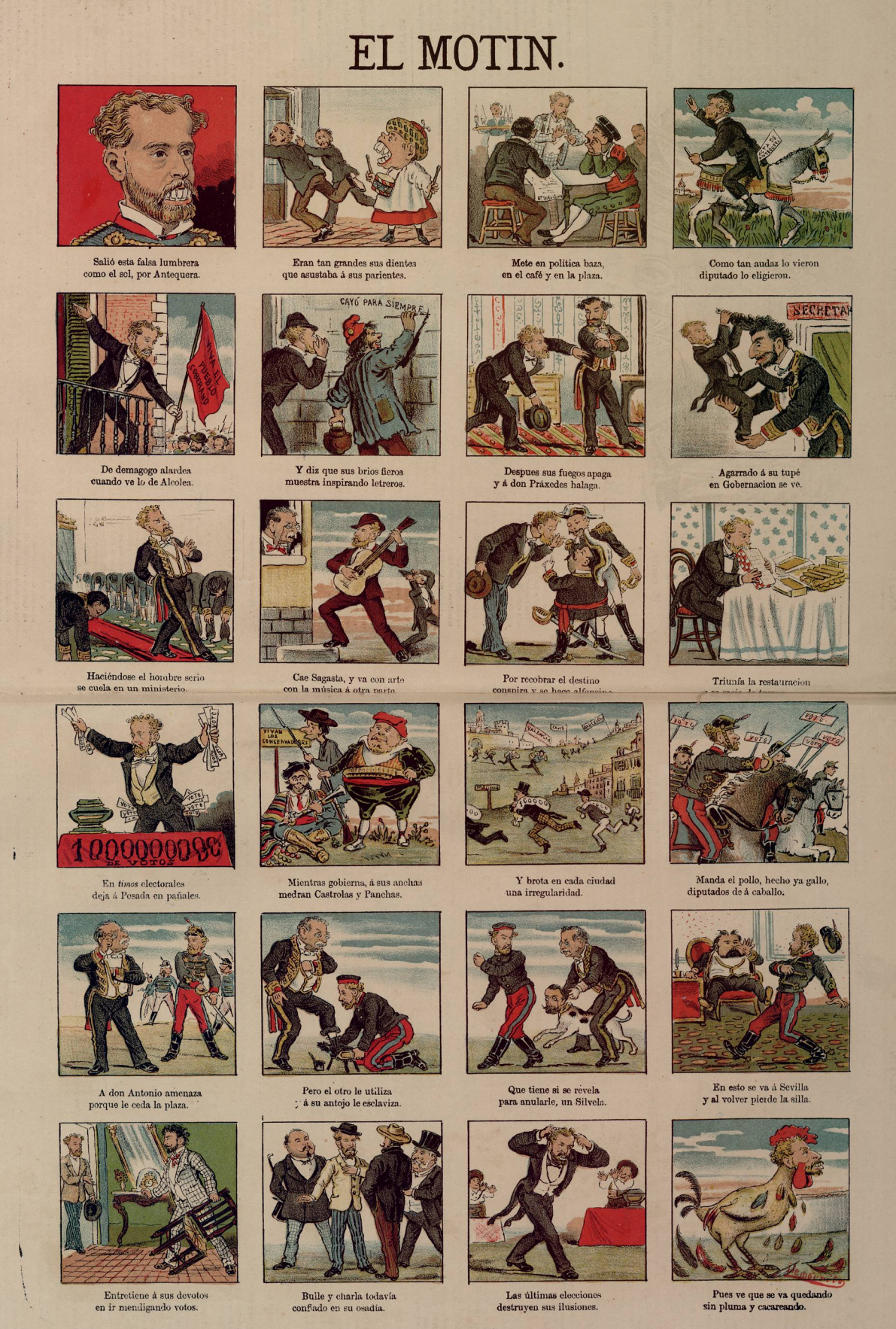
Cartoon (by Auca) in El Motín on the political career of Francisco Romero Robledo, published on August 28, 1881, a few months after the fall of the government of Cánovas, of which he was the “skillful” Minister of the Interior. One of the comments reads: “In electoral scams / leave Posada in diapers” (“En timos electorales / deja a Posada en pañales”); Romero Robledo is depicted brandishing banknotes with pockets full of banknotes.

The mechanism of electoral fraud—greatly facilitated by the single-member district system—began with what was known as the encasillado, that is, the peaceful distribution of seats between the party that had just formed a government, which was granted a comfortable majority in the Cortes with ministerial deputies, and the outgoing party, which received a significantly smaller but sufficient number of seats to play its role as the "loyal opposition"—usually around fifty seats. The meeting to carry out the encasillado (literally "grid" or "framework")—so called because it involved "fitting" the deputies of both dynastic parties into the "grid of boxes" formed by more than 300 single-member districts and the hundred or so positions in the 26 multi-member constituencies—was held at the headquarters of the Ministry of the Interior. "For the candidate, the election was decided in the corridors of the Ministry of the Interior." It was there that the minister, acting as the "Grand Elector"—best exemplified by Francisco Romero Robledo, who inherited the title from José Posada Herrera of the Isabelline period, as he too had an "extraordinary ability to maneuver from the ministry and little scruple in doing so to ensure that the results conformed to the wishes of the government and his own in particular"—agreed with the representative of the outgoing government party on the distribution of constituencies, which often also included those that would be granted to non-dynastic parties. For example, governments always respected the seat of Gumersindo de Azcárate in León or that of the Carlist Matías Barrio y Mier in Cervera de Pisuerga.

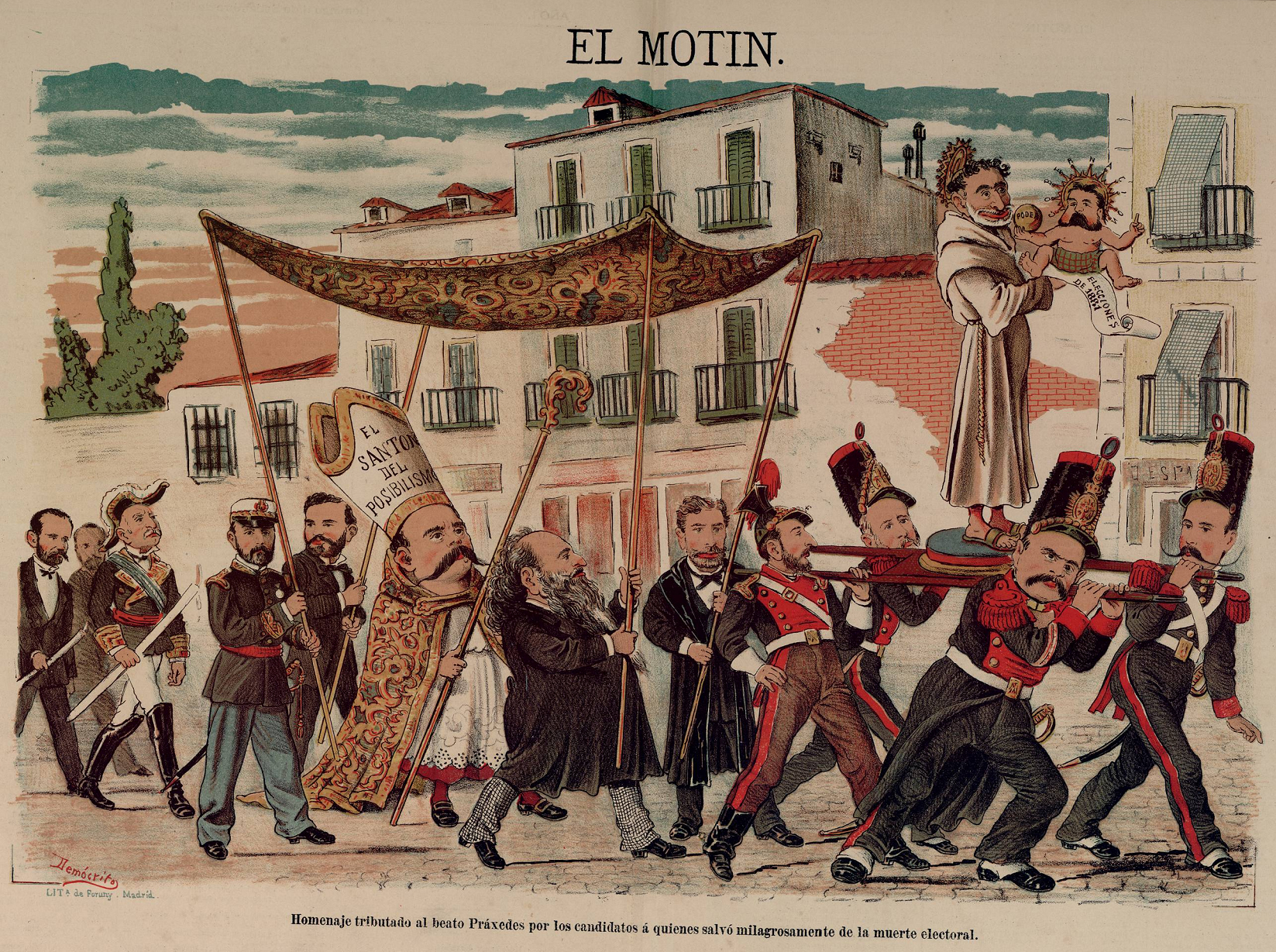
Caricature by El Motín entitled Homage paid to the blessed Práxedes by the candidates he miraculously saved from electoral death (1881), showing several elected deputies in procession (under a canopy and with the bishop's mitre, the republican Emilio Castelar) behind the president of the government Sagasta carried on a litter, who in turn is carrying in his arms the Minister of the Interior Venancio González, who is the one who actually performed the miraculous act.

The Minister of the Interior and the representative of the outgoing government decided—although local bosses (caciques) and party faction leaders were also involved in the negotiations—which districts were available ("docile," "dead," or "vacant"). The candidates for these districts were known as cuneros or "transhumants" because they had no local roots (historian Romero Salvador calls them "birds of passage," as they had no district of their own). In contrast, "own districts" were generally excluded from the distribution, meaning that a particular deputy, whether conservative or liberal, who had become the local oligarch or great cacique, had their election guaranteed through clientelist networks. For this reason, presenting an alternative candidate was pointless, as it was known in advance that they would be defeated, although tradition dictated that an opponent continued to be fielded if the great cacique did not belong to the turno government. José Varela Ortega refers to deputies from these districts as "natural candidates," while Carmelo Romero Salvador calls them "hermit crabs" because "just as these small crustaceans enter an empty shell from which they are difficult to dislodge, these deputies seize control of a district’s representation, becoming irremovable." Thus, they formed "enduring caciquisms, with the same deputy across multiple legislatures."

Regarding the cuneros deputies, Romero Salvador points out that when new elections were called, "the internal struggle among the numerous aspirants for the nomination could be, and in most cases was, more competitive and difficult than the election itself. Being encasillado meant having the support of the government’s apparatus and resources, with everything that entailed, and since the opponent, if there was one, lacked these and also did not have sufficient weight in these districts without a cacique, they were usually elected." An example of a cunero deputy could be Joaquín Chapaprieta, born in Torrevieja (Alicante), who was once a deputy for Cieza (Murcia), another time for Loja (Granada), another for Santa María de Órdenes (La Coruña), and twice for Noia (La Coruña). Another case is that of the journalist and writer José Martínez Ruiz Azorín, born in Monóvar (Alicante) and a parliamentary chronicler for the conservative newspaper ABC, who between 1907 and 1919 was elected four times as a deputy for the districts of Sorbas and Purchena in Almería, and a fifth time for Ponteareas (Pontevedra). In the case of the latter district, "he did not even have to go there. He merely wrote an article for a local magazine and sent a telegram of thanks: ‘I express my love for the beautiful Galician land and cordially thank the good coreligionists [of the Conservative Party] with whom I share affection and admiration for the illustrious son of Galicia, accomplished by the Treasury portfolio.’" This "illustrious son of Galicia" was Gabino Bugallal. Romero Salvador notes that throughout the Restoration, the number of districts occupied by the "hermit crabs"—who retained their seat regardless of the party in government—increased, meaning a corresponding decrease in the number of "free" districts, which reduced the government's leeway in placing deputies through encasillado. The proof of this is that, although the government calling the elections always won them, the difference in seats with the other dynastic party decreased throughout the first third of the 20th century. Romero Salvador compiled a list of deputies who held seats in the same district ten times or more during the Restoration. He found a total of 68: 32 conservatives, 32 liberals, three republicans (including Gumersindo de Azcárate for León), and one independent Catholic (for the district of Zumaya). Among the conservatives, notable figures include Antonio Maura (elected 19 consecutive times between 1891 and 1923 for Palma de Mallorca) and Eduardo Dato (17 terms, 12 of them for the district of Murias de Paredes). On the liberal side, the most prominent was the Count of Romanones (17 consecutive terms for Guadalajara). Romero Salvador also highlights the existence of parliamentary dynasties, such as the Cánovas family—three brothers, four nephews, a brother-in-law, and a brother-in-law by marriage of Antonio Cánovas del Castillo—, the Sagasta family—a son, a stepson, a grandson, several uncles, and cousins—, the Silvela family—two brothers, his father-in-law, his brothers-in-law, and a nephew—, or the Maura family—three sons. Some deputies "inherited" the districts of their fathers. Wenceslao Fernández Flórez, a parliamentary chronicler for the monarchist and conservative newspaper ABC, wrote in 1916:

When we write these lines, the precept that the nation cannot be the patrimony of any family or person has not yet been violated. It is not yet, indeed, the patrimony of a single family, but of four or five, who have sons, sons-in-law, uncles, cousins, nephews, grandsons, and brothers-in-law in all positions and all chambers.

Article 29 of the 1907 electoral law, promoted by the conservative Antonio Maura, simplified the encasillado by establishing that in districts where only one candidate ran, they would be elected without the need for a vote. Romero Salvador highlights the paradox of depriving some voters of their right to vote at the very moment when, for the first time in Spain, the law made voting mandatory and, at least in theory, punished those who did not comply. Article 29 remained in force for the next seven elections, during which 734 seats—a quarter of the total—were allocated through this system. In the 1916 elections, called and won by the liberal Romanones, and the 1923 elections, called and won by the other liberal, Manuel García Prieto, a third of the deputies obtained their seats without going through the ballot box. "In both cases, as many voters were deprived of the power to exercise their vote (1.7 million) as there were actual voters (two million) in the districts and constituencies where elections did take place." Carmelo Romero Salvador explains the widespread application of Article 29 as follows: "Since going through the ballot box always involved, even when the election was assured, inconveniences, expenses, and a greater dependency on the personal and collective demands of voters, reaching agreements to avoid competition between candidates became a highly sought-after goal."

==== "Preparation" of the election ====
Once the encasillado was agreed upon, the Minister of the Interior would inform the civil governors—appointed by the government "in agreement with provincial caciques"—of the results that were to be produced in the districts and constituencies of their province. These, in turn, relayed the instructions to the mayors, who were the authorities responsible for the electoral process (they were in charge of updating electoral rolls and organizing polling stations). "Normally, a threatening letter from the governor to the mayors sufficed, accompanied by a note indicating the government's electoral wishes. When letters had no effect, they resorted to 'summoning the mayors and secretaries' of disobedient towns in the presence of the governor, who 'pressured' them and forced them to comply or resign."

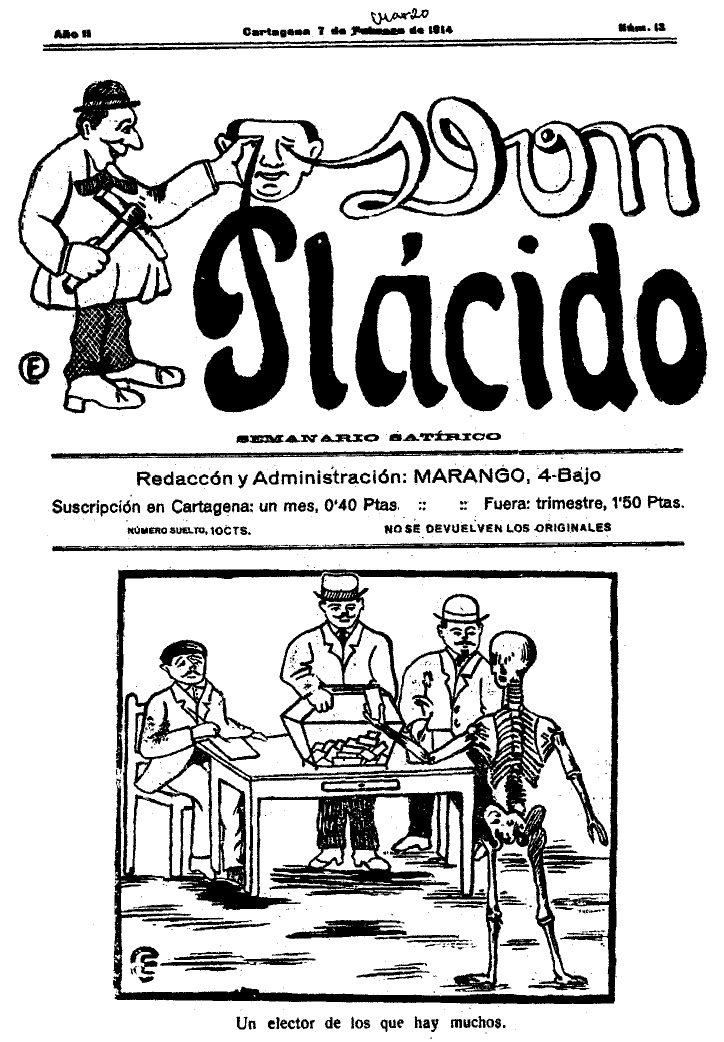
Cover of the satirical weekly Don Plácido, from Cartagena, in 1914. It shows a skeleton voting with the subtitle “A voter like many others”, denouncing electoral fraud by lázaros (fake voters who vote using the name of a deceased person who had been fraudulently registered on the census).

They were threatened with administrative proceedings, inspections—those by forest assessors (montes) were particularly feared since they determined whether lands remained communal property—or the suspension of any public works projects. As a last resort, municipal councilors and secretaries could be suspended. If threats were ineffective, the governor took direct action, asserting that municipal law allowed them to fine mayors for disrespect or disobedience to higher authorities or "for omissions that could be detrimental to the public," a clause open to broad interpretation. Governors could also suspend mayors outright, as municipal law permitted. In 1884, the civil governor of Almería boasted of having dismissed sixty municipal councils and imposed fines totaling 30,000 pesetas. The same applied to municipal and first-instance judges, as having judges under their influence ensured that electoral manipulations would go unpunished. As José Varela Ortega points out, "The presence of central power within local corporations, as established by law, constituted the foundation of government interference in elections. [...] It was enough for the civil governor to 'properly' exercise his hierarchical authority to turn mayors into 'puppets' serving the government."

Testimony of the Catalan Republican Valentí Almirall
To compile the list of voters, a few real names are included among a multitude of imaginary ones and, above all, of the deceased. The representation of the latter is always entrusted to agents disguised in civilian clothing to go and vote. The author of these lines has repeatedly seen his father, who had been dead for several years, go to cast his vote in the guise of a city sweeper or a police detective, dressed in a borrowed suit. The individuals who make up the electoral boards often witness similar transmigrations of the souls of their own fathers. [...]

The control of municipal corporations allowed for the first step in the "preparation of the district," which was the preparation of electoral rolls. Until the 1907 electoral law, their compilation was the responsibility of municipalities—after that date, it was entrusted to the Spanish Geographic and Statistical Institute. Voter lists were "inflated" with the names of nonexistent people—often, the names of fictitious voters were taken from cemetery tombstones. Those who "embodied" them (municipal officials, bailiffs, people brought in from outside as part of flying squads, etc.) were called lázaros because they had "risen from the dead." Conversely, the lists were also "lightened" by eliminating "hostile" voters. During the era of census suffrage (1878–1890), tax quotas were manipulated so that individuals who might not vote for the encasillado candidate were excluded from the lists. Thanks to this method, during the 1884 elections, the Minister of the Interior, Francisco Romero Robledo, reduced the number of voters in the Madrid constituency from 33,205 to 12,250.

The next step was controlling the polling stations, which was done through the mayors responsible for organizing them (hence the importance of having municipal councils under control to ensure the desired election outcome). Control of the polling stations "was carried out either by falsifying the election of their members, manipulating the census or the signatures that elected them [...]. In Trebujena (Jerez) in 1884, the mayor forced voters who had signed the liberal list of polling station members to remove their names, transfer them to the official candidacy, and even arrested participants in a meeting held to protest his actions."

==== Election day: Pucherazo ====
Once the "loyalty" of the municipal council was secured, the desired result was ensured through all kinds of fraudulent methods. The 1907 electoral law aimed to put an end to these practices but failed, as there was no political will to enforce it, allowing fraud to continue. Many of the mechanisms of electoral fraud were not new; they had been used since the reign of Isabella II, as evidenced by a law passed in June 1864, which penalized manipulations, corruption, and fraud during the electoral process. This law included around thirty acts classified as electoral crimes. The generic term pucherazo—literally "overturning the pot" (i.e., the ballot box)—was used to describe any type of fraudulent action.

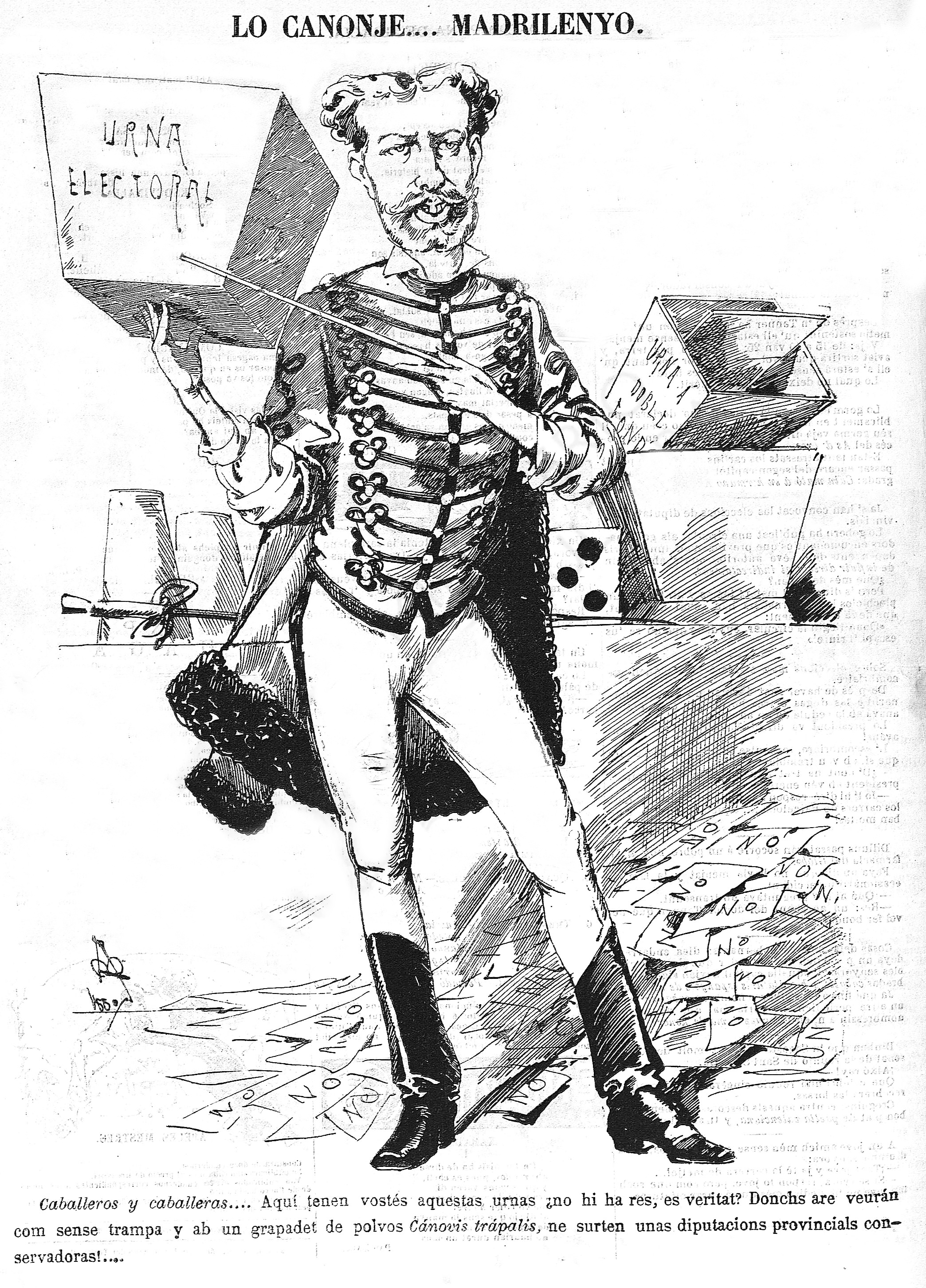
Cartoon from La Campana de Gracia (1880) entitled Lo canonje... madrilenyo (“The canon... from Madrid”) denouncing the pucherazo. The conjuror is the Minister of the Interior Francisco Romero Robledo. The caption of the image reads (in Catalan): “Ladies and gentlemen... Here are the ballot boxes, there's nothing in them, is there? Well, now you're going to see how, without cheating and with just a handful of Cánovis trápalis powders, they produce conservative-leaning provincial delegations.”

All sorts of tricks were used, such as spreading false news about the last-minute withdrawal of the opposing candidate, changing voting hours, or relocating the polling station to another place. Adversarial ballots were "vanished," while favorable ones were placed into the ballot box—a practice known in Bilbao as embuchado or bolilleo. In extreme cases, people would violently storm the polling station and smash the ballot boxes to annul the election if an unfavorable result was expected.

If necessary, although relatively rare, votes could simply be bought—during the 1907 elections, the Count of Romanones paid between five and fifteen pesetas per vote—or recourse was made to violence and intimidation by the Partida de la Porra ("the cudgel gang"). There were even cases of voters being detained by public order forces to prevent them from voting, as happened in Ciudad Rodrigo in 1890.

However, as José Varela Ortega points out, "physical coercion was very rare. The most common form of coercion was to pressure voters dependent on the administration. And to some degree, they were all forced—not just civil servants—since every ministry had influence over a sphere of public life and had a coercive arsenal to intervene in voters' private lives." "Besides these individual pressures, the administration, as the country's largest employer, could directly coerce 'official elements such as district mayors, night watchmen, tax collectors, and other figures who made up the so-called electoral court.'"

If all else failed, ballot boxes were simply replaced with others filled with votes for the encasillado candidate—this was pucherazo in the strict sense—or the results' records were simply falsified.

However, in the vast majority of polling stations, there was no violence on election day because the "preparation of the district" (manipulating voter lists and local authorities) "generally rendered explicit coercion unnecessary." However, the fundamental reason coercion was not needed was the lack of political competition and the resulting voter demobilization—this was the main characteristic of the system, according to Valera Ortega. When in certain elections (such as in 1886, 1891, or 1903) the Minister of the Interior decided not to intervene so that votes would be "clean," the caciques took matters into their own hands and committed all the necessary fraud. Voter abstention during the Restoration elections was massive, far higher than reflected in the official records, which were systematically falsified—polling stations where almost no one had voted later appeared in official data with over 80% turnout; in many rural districts, official participation rates of 100% were not uncommon; in urban areas, real participation never exceeded 20%, though official figures reported it as above 75%. A foreign diplomat observed:

In villages and small towns (pueblos), the mayors managed the election, and in the generally deserted polling stations, there was a silence and solitude interrupted only occasionally by the hesitant steps of a voter who, under coercion—so as not to lose a tenancy or a sharecropping agreement or to avoid a tax threat—would go to drop into the ballot box a slip where his political thoughts had been written, in Spanish Roman letters, by the hand of the municipal secretary, who was, as a rule, a fairly skilled calligrapher.

According to José Varela Ortega, "Obviously, we must not forget the coercive element in the caciquil relationship, but neither should we exaggerate it. caciquism was also, and perhaps mainly, a pact whose functioning relied more on consensus than on violent imposition; it thrived not so much on repression as on indifference. Abstention was not something the government forced—it was something it benefited from."

Once the election was completed—it took place on a Sunday, from 8 a.m. to 4 p.m.—the elected candidates presented themselves in Madrid to form the Cortes. There was still one last possibility of annulling the election of a non-encasillado candidate through the process of verifying the records, as the Congress of Deputies (with a "ministerial" majority) had the authority to review them if it found any "formal defect."

== Inability of the system to evolve into a democratic regime ==
With the introduction of universal (male) suffrage in 1890—expanding the number of voters from 800,000 to 4,800,000—it became more difficult to secure the victory of ministerial candidates in large cities such as Madrid, Barcelona, and Valencia (which, however, accounted for only 10% of the population). This was evidenced by the increasing number of Republican deputies elected in these districts, sometimes even achieving a majority (in coalition with the Socialists from 1910 onward). A similar situation occurred with the Carlist deputies elected in Navarre and the Basque Country, as well as with the Catalanist deputies of the Lliga Regionalista in the Barcelona constituency from 1901 onward. Nevertheless, neither the Republicans, Socialists, nor Carlists ever secured enough parliamentary representation to threaten the turno government—for example, the number of Republican deputies peaked at 36 in 1903 out of a total of 400, while the Socialists had only 7 in 1923.

According to Carlos Dardé, two reasons explain why the implementation of universal suffrage failed to dismantle the turno system and democratize public life.

Firstly, rural single-member constituencies remained the majority (accounting for about 300 deputies out of approximately 400), and the "cacique networks" continued to function. Even in multi-member districts that included large cities (about 100 deputies), extensive rural areas were still included, meaning that rural votes (controlled by caciques) could "drown out" the much more independent urban votes. As a result, the victory of encasillado candidates was assured. This reason was also highlighted by José Varela Ortega: "Contrary to expectations, list-based constituencies were insufficient to encourage mobilization; given the predominance of the rural electorate, setting up an urban electoral machine to recruit citizen votes instead of organizing clientelist submissions was not worthwhile, since the electoral reward in urban votes was significantly lower than what could be obtained through agreements with rural caciques."

Secondly, and most importantly, was "the social condition—economic and cultural—of the new voters, and their political outlook. The vast majority of the male electorate that had gained the right to vote did not consist of urban middle-class or working-class citizens, nor independent peasants committed to a democratic political project. Instead, it was composed of extremely poor and illiterate rural masses who were entirely unfamiliar with such a project—harboring hopes of a social revolution in the southern half of the country and of a Carlist victory in much of the north. Furthermore, these masses had either suffered intense police repression (as with Andalusian day laborers) or had been defeated in a civil war (as with the Carlists)."

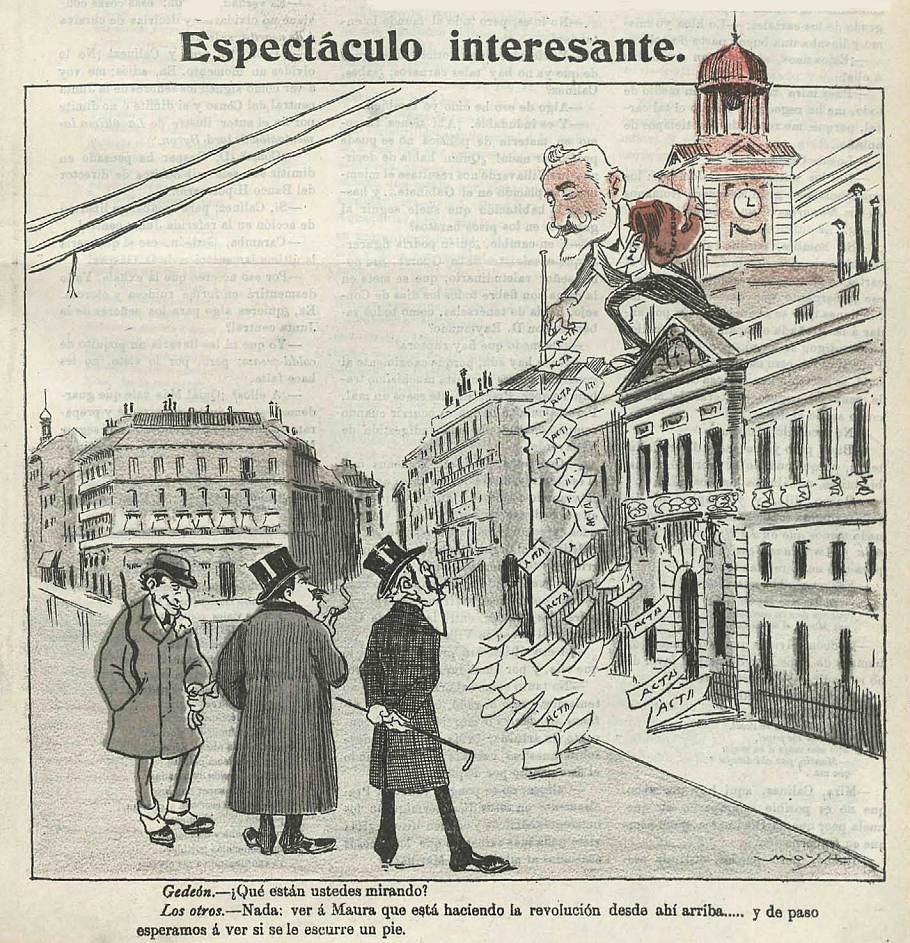
Satirical cartoon on the “revolution from above” of the conservative leader Antonio Maura published in Gedeón in 1903 under the title “Interesting Spectacle”. It represents the contradiction of Maura's revolution from above, which claimed to democratize the system but resorted to the caciquil system and electoral fraud to obtain the majority necessary in the Cortes to approve the reform.

José Varela Ortega identifies a third factor—one he considers the most fundamental: "the lack of 'modern' parties based on public opinion and, instead, the existence of cacique-based parties reliant on small client networks more interested in personal favors than ideological commitments," since the parties of the turno "consisted of a conglomerate of factions that were only tenuously linked to a centralized party apparatus." Varela Ortega cites a regenerationist text that provided an apt diagnosis—"Who is to blame? Everyone: the government that corrupts the electorate and the electorate that allows itself to be corrupted"—and offered the appropriate remedy—"revive public opinion; elect worthy deputies." Varela Ortega also notes that the politicians of the Restoration "were not anti-democratic on principle"—in fact, some of the harshest critiques of caciquism came from them—but they were resistant to change because of "the price that democracy demanded: political mobilization." "First, it was difficult for them to break away from their cacique organizations, especially since public pressure to do so was weak. Secondly, they feared dismantling them. At the time, it was commonly believed that leaving politics in the hands of a malleable and submissive electorate meant placing it at the discretion of the Minister of the Interior of the ruling party, who, by excluding rivals, could trigger a return to the cycle of coups. [...] Liberal politicians felt trapped between what they saw as the madness of cantonalism and the nightmare of witnessing the ultimate victory of their 'common enemy,' Carlism, 'playing the counter-revolutionary firefighter.'"

Varela Ortega emphasizes that "the abandonment of the principle of national sovereignty trapped the regime in a deadlock from which it was difficult to escape. Dynastic politicians always maintained that the arbitral role assigned to the Crown was essential until opinion-based parties emerged to replace it. However, achieving this required dismantling caciquism by mobilizing public opinion and making the electorate the source of political power. This, in turn, meant directly challenging the prerogatives that political practice had assigned to the Crown. The Restoration politicians never managed to resolve the contradiction in which they were caught—bringing democracy without the dangers and inconveniences of mobilization. […] Maura warned his colleagues that a liberal regime deprived of public opinion's support could easily fall victim to a military coup. Ultimately, that is exactly what happened." According to Varela Ortega, Primo de Rivera’s coup in 1923 "also destroyed any hopes for a democratic transformation," and from then on, it became evident that democracy "could only take shape within a republican regime. Thus, the dictatorship of Primo de Rivera ultimately benefited the republican cause. Since they found themselves in control of the political landscape, without rivals or a caciquil system, […] they achieved in a single day what they had been unable to accomplish in several years."

== See also ==
- Caciquism
- Turno
- Pact of El Pardo
- Conservative Party (Spain)
- Liberal Party (Spain, 1880)
- Regenerationism
- Restoration (Spain)

== Bibliography ==
- Carr, Raymond (2001). España: de la Restauración a la democracia : 1875~1980 [Spain: from the Restoration to democracy: 1875~1980]. Ariel Historia (in Spanish) (7th ed.). Barcelone: Ariel. ISBN 9-788434-465428.
- Dardé, Carlos (1996). La Restauración, 1875-1902. Alfonso XII y la regencia de María Cristina [The Restoration, 1875-1902. Alfonso XII and the regency of María Cristina] (in Spanish). Madrid: Historia 16-Temas de Hoy. ISBN 84-7679-317-0.
- Dardé, Carlos (2003). "En torno a la biografía de Alfonso XII: cuestiones metodológicas y de interpretación" [On the biography of Alfonso XII: methodological and interpretative issues] (PDF). Ayer (in Spanish) (52): 39–56. Archived from the original (PDF) on February 10, 2023.
- Dardé, Carlos (2003a). "Presentación" [Presentation] (PDF). Ayer (in Spanish) (52): 11–13. Archived from the original (PDF) on February 9, 2023.
- Dardé, Carlos (2021). Alfonso XII. Un rey liberal. Biografía breve [Alfonso XII. A liberal king. Brief biography] (in Spanish). Madrid: Ediciones 19. ISBN 978-84-17280-70-3.
- Espadas Burgos, Manuel (1974). Alfonso XII en el centenario de la Restauración [Alfonso XII on the centenary of the Restoration] (in Spanish). Madrid: Instituto de Estudios Madrileños.
- Gómez Ochoa, Fidel (2003). "La formación del Partido Conservador: la fusión conservadora" [The formation of the Conservative Party: the Conservative merger] (PDF). Ayer (in Spanish) (52): 57–90. Archived from the original (PDF) on February 10, 2023.
- Jover, José María (1981). Revolución burguesa, oligarquía y constitucionalismo (1834-1923) [Bourgeois revolution, oligarchy and constitutionalism (1834-1923)] (in Spanish). Barcelona: Labor. ISBN 84-335-9428-1.
- Lario, Ángeles (2003). "Alfonso XII. El rey que quiso ser constitucional" [Alfonso XII. The king who wanted to be constitutional] (PDF). Ayer (in Spanish) (52): 15–38. Archived from the original (PDF) on February 10, 2023.
- Milán García, José Ramón (2003). "Los liberales en el reinado de Alfonso XII: el difícil arte de aprender de los fracasos" [Liberals in the reign of Alfonso XII: the difficult art of learning from failure] (PDF). Ayer (in Spanish) (52): 91–116. Archived from the original (PDF) on February 10, 2023.
- Montero, Feliciano (1997). La Restauración. De la Regencia a Alfonso XIII [The Restoration. From the Regency to Alfonso XIII] (in Spanish). Madrid: Espasa-Calpe. ISBN 84-239-8959-3.
- Romero Salvador, Carmelo (2021). Caciques y caciquismo en España (1834-2020) [Chieftains and chieftainism in Spain (1834-2020)] (in Spanish). Madrid: Los Libros de la Catarata. ISBN 978-84-1352-212-8.
- Seco Serrano, Carlos (2007). Alfonso XII (in Spanish). Barcelona: Ariel. ISBN 978-84-344-5210-7.
- Suárez Cortina, Manuel (2006). La España Liberal (1868-1917). Política y sociedad [Liberal Spain (1868-1917). Politics and society] (in Spanish). Madrid: Síntesis. ISBN 84-9756-415-4.
- Varela Ortega, José (2001). Los amigos políticos. Partidos, elecciones y caciquismo en la Restauración (1875-1900) [Political friends. Parties, elections and local strongmen in the Restoration (1875-1900)] (in Spanish). Madrid: Marcial Pons. ISBN 84-7846-993-1.
- Villares, Ramón (2009). Historia de España [History of Spain] (in Spanish). Vol. 7 : Restauración y Dictadura. Madrid: Crítica/Marcial Pons.
