= Spanish Draft Constitution of 1856 =

Proposed constitution of Spain

The Spanish Constitution of 1856, also known as the "unborn (non nata)", was an unsuccessful attempt to reform the political system during the reign of Isabella II. Although it was passed by the Cortes, it was never implemented due to the "counterrevolutionary coup" of General Leopoldo O'Donnell that ended the bienio progresista.

As a consequence of enacting an illegal constitution, Queen Isabella II decreed the closure of the constituent assembly elected in 1854. The document was therefore officially declared merely a failed draft project although technically it was a valid constitution.

It is important as it collected together the ideas of progressive liberal ideology and anticipated some of the ideas developed later by the Spanish Constitution of 1869 which ended the autocratic monarchy of Isabella and put the more democratic Amadeo I of Spain on the throne.
