= Manifesto of Sandhurst =

Political manifesto signed by Alfonso de Borbón, future King Alfonso XII of Spain

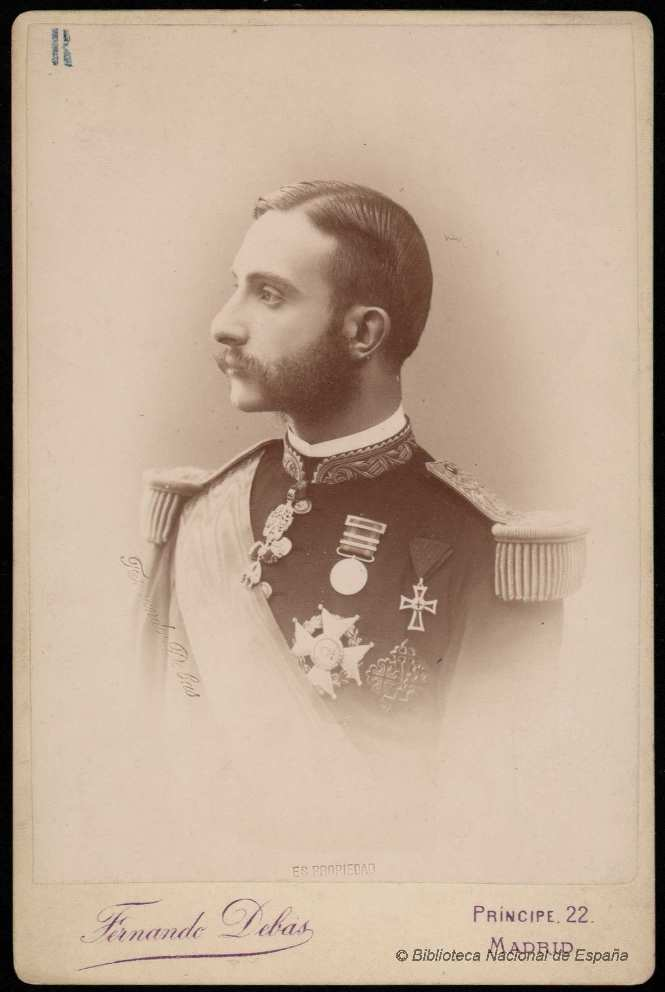
Photograph of the young King Alfonso XII.

The Manifesto of Sandhurst or Sandhurst Manifesto was a political manifesto signed by the then Prince Alfonso de Borbón (future King Alfonso XII of Spain), while he was in exile studying at the British Royal Military Academy of Sandhurst, hence the name by which it was known. It was made public on December 1, 1874, three days after the prince had turned seventeen, and was carefully drafted by Antonio Cánovas del Castillo, the leader of Alfonsism within Spain. Cánovas' aim was "that it be understood already that Spain has a king, capable of wielding the scepter as soon as he is called", as he wrote to the former sovereign, Isabel II.

The manifesto was published by the Spanish press on December 27. Two days later, on December 29, General Martínez Campos led the pronunciamiento of Sagunto in which Alfonso XII was proclaimed king of Spain. The movement did not find great opposition in the country and Cánovas quickly assumed the Ministry-Regency while waiting for the king, which meant the birth of the Bourbon Restoration.

== Historical background ==
Prince Alfonso was the son of Queen Isabella II of Spain and had turned seventeen on November 28, 1874. He was in exile after the 1868 revolution that dethroned his mother. He had studied in several countries and completed his training at the British Military Academy of Sandhurst.

In Spain, after the Revolution of 1868, different regimes had succeeded each other in a period known as the Democratic Sexennium. In 1874 the Federal Republic had fallen, after General Pavia's coup, and the power of the Republic was in the hands of General Serrano.

Antonio Cánovas del Castillo had collaborated in the drafting of the Manzanares Manifesto (1854) and had held various positions with the governments of the Liberal Union. From 1873 onwards, he managed the complete return of the Bourbons to Spain, becoming the true architect of the Bourbon Restoration.

== Elaboration and publication ==
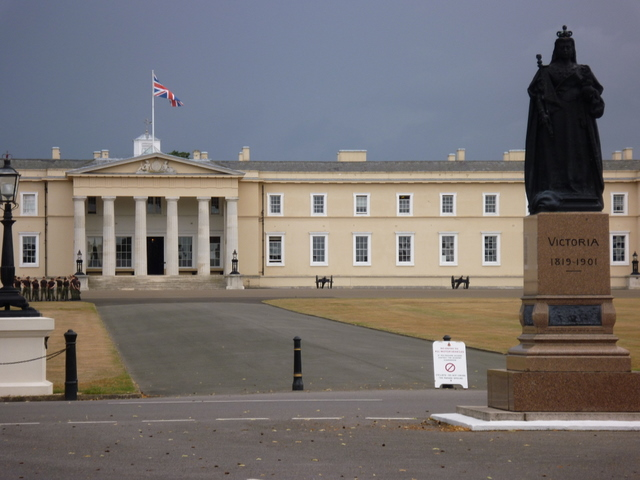
View of the Royal Military Academy of Sandhurst with the statue of Queen Victoria in the foreground. Prince Alfonso had been studying military studies there since October 1874.

Formally it was a letter sent from the British Royal Military Academy of Sandhurst, where Prince Alfonso had entered at the beginning of October 1874 on the initiative of Antonio Cánovas del Castillo, the leader of the Alfonsism cause since August 1873, in order to enhance his constitutional image, in response to the numerous congratulations he had received from Spain on the occasion of his 17th birthday and especially to a document, drafted by the Marquis of Molins and signed by the high nobility, in which, after congratulating him "when V. A. reaches the threshold of manhood", "directing his studies to the military sciences in which one is taught to obey in order to know how to command", and after alluding to England, model of constitutional monarchies, which "fosters with filial care the almost religious love between kings and subjects", they told him as follows:

[The undersigned], firm in their religious beliefs, loyal to their legitimate kings, fond of the representative institutions of their country... ask God, by whom kings reign and by whom legislators justly agree, that V. A. may find the reward of his noble conduct and that he may be, in all concepts, a prince worthy of the name he bears, of the century in which he lives and of the country in which he was born.

The letter-manifesto had been written by Cánovas, although it passed through several hands, including the former Queen Isabel II, who, according to Cánovas, discussed it "at length". It was sent to several European newspapers, which published it (the English Morning Post and The Times; the French La Liberté, and the Austrian Die Presse), but not to any sovereign. According to Manuel Suárez Cortina, the moment chosen by Cánovas to publish the Manifesto was not only due to the 17th birthday of Prince Alfonso but also to the fact that the candidacy to the throne of the Duke of Montpensier, married to the younger sister of Isabel II, was reappearing.

== Content ==
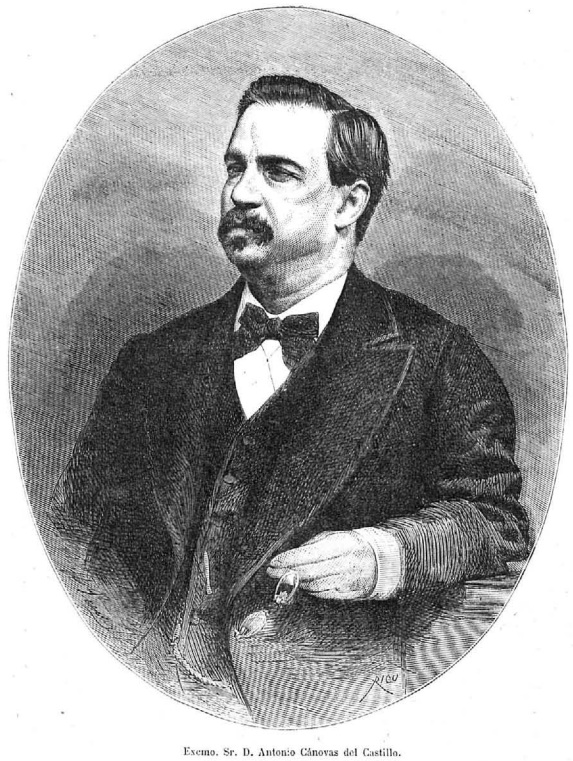
Antonio Cánovas del Castillo in 1872. From August 1873 he headed the "Alfonsin" cause and was the author of the Manifesto.

In the Manifesto Prince Alfonso offered the restoration of the "hereditary and representative monarchy" in his person ("the only representative of the monarchical right in Spain") as "the only thing that inspires confidence in Spain" since "the nation is now orphaned of all public right and indefinitely deprived of its liberties". The Manifesto concluded: "Whatever my own fate may be, I will not cease to be a good Spaniard, nor, like all my ancestors, a good Catholic, nor, as a man of the century, truly liberal". On this final paragraph of the Manifesto, Prince Alfonso had to reassure his mother: "Allow me to tell you that it is more affirmative to say that "I will be, like my ancestors, a good Catholic" than to say that I will be as Catholic as them, because in the former I start from the principle of being good Catholics and in the latter I could imitate whoever I wanted to, because among so many ancestors there have been all sorts of things". On the other hand, a character in a novel by Benito Pérez Galdós echoed the contradiction that it was at the time to proclaim oneself both liberal and Catholic at the same time: "Liberal and Catholic? But the Pope has said that liberalism is a sin! Unless Prince Alfonso has discovered the secret to introduce the soul of Pius IX into the body of Espartero...".

As Ramón Villares has pointed out, "the contents of this manifesto are a prodigy of conciseness. In barely a thousand words the basic principles of the Restoration regime are summarized...". Villares highlights three: dynastic continuity, Constitutional Monarchy and the prince's proclamation of a patriotic, liberal and Catholic sentiment. Feliciano Montero agrees with Villares: the Manifesto constitutes "perhaps the best synthesis of the Canovist project of Alfonso's restoration", "a perfect synthesis of the inspiring principles of the new regime". Montero points out four: "to fill with dynastic legitimacy a political and juridical vacuum that in fact had been widening during the sexennium" ("Orphaned the nation now of all public law and indefinitely deprived of its liberties", it is said in the Manifesto); "to conciliate, to pacify, to look for ways of compromise, to accommodate the maximum number of positions" (".... before long, all those of good faith will be with me, regardless of their political background, understanding that they cannot fear exclusions either from a new and dispassionate monarch or from a regime that today imposes itself precisely because it represents union and peace"); "a national sovereignty shared between the king and the Cortes" ("It is not necessary to expect me to decide anything flatly and arbitrarily; without the Cortes, the Spanish princes did not solve the arduous business of the ancient times of the Monarchy"); and "the announced "tolerant" solution to the religious question" ("Whatever my own fate may be, I will not cease to be a good Spaniard, nor, like all my ancestors, a good Catholic, nor, as a man of the century, a true liberal").

Manuel Suárez Cortina has made an assessment of the Manifesto that essentially coincides with that of Villares and Montero: "The Manifesto was a work of delicate tact to put in Alfonso's mouth the basic ideas of the Restoration. From the point of view of content, it expressed the desire for reconciliation that the new reign should have, the traditional, but also open and integrating character of the constitutional Monarchy and the need to overcome both the political framework of the Constitution of 1845 and that of 1869 [...] It also showed the need to make Catholic tradition compatible with freedom...". Carlos Seco Serrano shares the same assessment: "The text clearly summarizes the Canovist idea and program, based on a principle of historical continuity: its vision of a Spain articulated around two historical axes: the monarchy and the Cortes; its integrating design; the opening to all Spaniards of good faith; the conciliation between Church and... a liberal State".

According to Ramón Villares, "its content should be understood as the expression of the political pact reached by the different internal factions of Alfonsism at the end of 1874 to legitimize the Bourbon alternative and to launch a program of action for the young prince... Its objective was to present both in Spain and abroad the main lines of the political operation that was in the making".

== Prince Alfonso's political ideas ==
What Prince Alfonso really thought is recorded in the following letter which he sent to his mother on November 30, 1874, the day before the Manifesto was made public (and which Cánovas leaked to the press):

I believe that in Spain what I will have to do will be to gather all the intellectual forces of the country and unite with them to kill the word 'party' and place in its place that of 'regeneration of the Fatherland' and, without ceasing, to try to raise our agriculture, our industry, our commerce..., to raise it to the level of the other European countries, to restore its finances, that is to say that there be economy and to protect the laws in the future, forgetting the past in order to obtain order. When this is done, which will not be in a short time no matter how hard we all Spaniards work, then let the parties be reborn again, as there should be and always have been in a constitutional monarchy..., but this will not be useful again in Spain until the time of my children. In my time there must not be parties, because just as in a war that overwhelms a country everything gives way to take up arms in defense of the Fatherland, so we must be fighting for some time against a very strong enemy, our own decay.

However, Ángeles Lario has pointed out that "in his practice as king he respected those parties that in his first regenerationist impulses he wanted to eliminate". Alfonso XII always "made clear his firm intention to govern constitutionally" "in the English way", hence his interest in knowing the functioning of British institutions, as he made evident in the private interview he had with Ambassador Layard in October 1875, when he was already king, to whom he asked many questions about the British political system. Carlos Dardé comments: "It cannot be pretended that a teenager, in the circumstances through which he had gone through, no matter how clever he was and how much the exile in France, Switzerland, Austria and Great Britain had taught him, was capable of finding the formula to provide stability to the liberal regime in Spain". And he adds: "Alfonso XII supported and identified himself with the best of a project that belonged to a generation before his own —with its appeal to unity and harmony, of patriotism—, but he was disconcerted when he saw the other side of the coin —the administrative corruption on which it largely rested—. He did not understand that Cánovas consented to all that and that he did not even give it much importance".

== Bibliography ==
- Dardé, Carlos (2003). "En torno a la biografía de Alfonso XII: cuestiones metodológicas y de interpretación" (PDF). Ayer (in Spanish) (52). Dossier: ‘’La política en el reinado de Alfonso XII’’, edited by Carlos Dardé.: 39–56.
- Espadas Burgos, Manuel (1974). Alfonso XII en el centenario de la Restauración (in Spanish). Series of conferences on illustrious Madrileños, nº 4. Legal Deposit 14.057. Madrid: Instituto de Estudios Madrileños.
- Lario, Ángeles (2003). "Alfonso XII. El rey que quiso ser constitucional" (PDF). Ayer (in Spanish) (52). Dossier: ‘’La política en el reinado de Alfonso XII’’, edited by Carlos Dardé.: 15–38.
- Montero, Feliciano (1997). "La Restauración (1875-1885)". In Montero, Feliciano; Tusell, Javier (eds.). La Restauración. De la Regencia a Alfonso XIII (in Spanish). Volumen XI. Historia de España-Espasa. Madrid: Espasa-Calpe. pp. 1–188. ISBN 84-239-8959-3.
- Seco Serrano, Carlos (2007). Alfonso XII (in Spanish). Barcelona: Ariel. ISBN 978-84-344-5210-7.
- Suárez Cortina, Manuel (2006). La España Liberal (1868-1917). Política y sociedad (in Spanish). Vol. 27 of Historia de España 3er. Milenio, edited by Elena Hernández Sandoica. Madrid: Síntesis. ISBN 84-9756-415-4.
- Villares, Ramón (2009). "Alfonso XII y Regencia. 1875-1902". In Moreno Luzón, Javier (ed.). Restauración y Dictadura (in Spanish). Vol. 7 of Historia de España, edited by Josep Fontana y Ramón Villares. Barcelona-Madrid: Crítica/Marcial Pons.
