= 1769 in art =

Events from the year 1769 in art.

== Events ==
- 25 April–27 May – First Royal Academy summer exhibition held at Pall Mall in London.
- 1 May–2 June The annual Society of Artists Exhibition of 1769 takes place in Spring Gardens in London.
- 25 August – The Salon of 1769 opens at the Louvre in Paris

== Awards ==
- Joshua Reynolds is knighted.

== Works ==
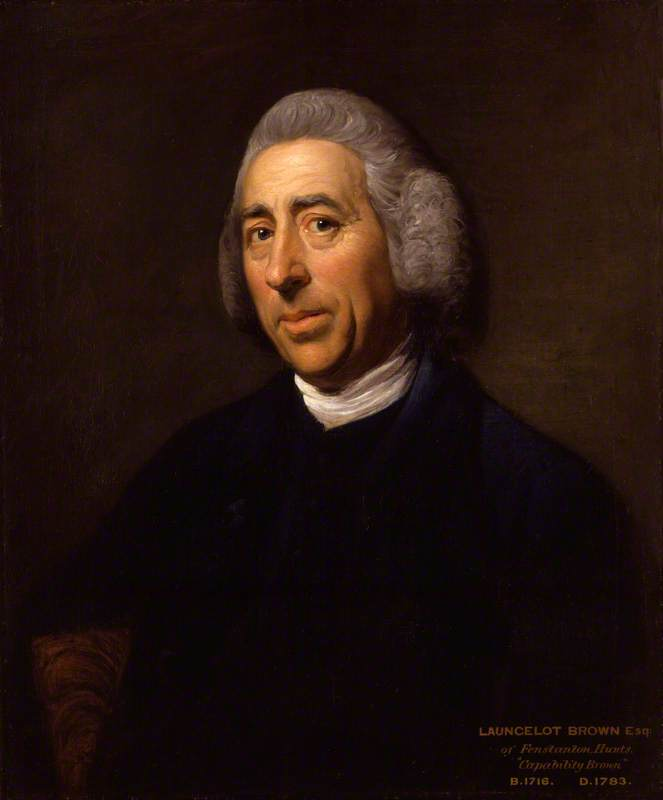
Portrait of Capability Brown by Nathaniel Dance-Holland

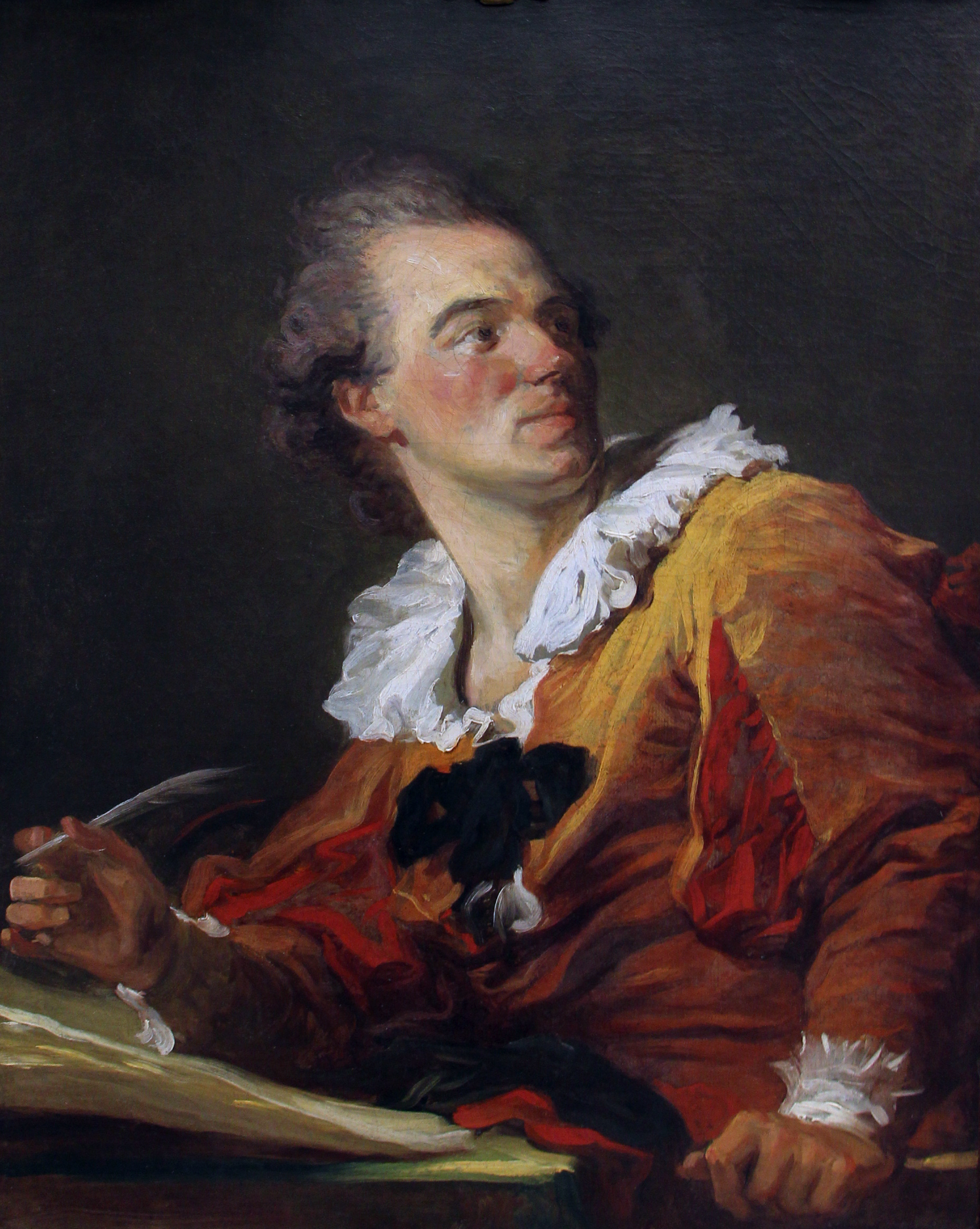
Fragonard – Inspiration (self-portrait)

- Pierre-Antoine Baudouin – The Honest Model
- Pompeo Batoni – Emperor Joseph II and Grand Duke Pietro Leopoldo of Tuscany
- Charles Catton – Self-portrait
- Joseph Ducreux – Marie Antoinette (portrait miniature)
- Nathaniel Dance-Holland
  - Portrait of Capability Brown
  - Portrait of Queen Charlotte
  - The Pybus Family
- Jean-Honoré Fragonard
  - Inspiration (Self-portrait, Louvre, Paris)
  - Self-portrait with palette and brushes (approximate date; Fragonard Museum, Hélène & Jean-François Costa Collection, Grasse)
- Thomas Gainsborough – Portrait of Lady Molyneux
- Jean-Baptiste Greuze – Septimius Severus and Caracalla
- Christopher Hewetson – Busts of Charles Townley and Sir Watkin Williams-Wynn
- Ozias Humphry – Charlotte, Princess Royal (portrait miniature, Windsor Castle)
- Edward Penny –The Gossiping Blacksmith
- Joshua Reynolds – Portrait of the Earl of Carlisle
- Alexander Roslin – John Jennings, His Brother and Sister-in-Law
- George Stubbs – The Milbanke and Melbourne Families
- Jean-Pierre-Antoine Tassaert – Love Triumphant (L'Amour prêt à lancer un trait, marble, approximate date)
- Benjamin West – The Departure of Regulus
- Joseph Wright of Derby – An Academy by Lamplight
- Johann Zoffany
  - The Bradshaw Family
  - The Drummond Family

== Births ==
- January 8 – Pietro Benvenuti, Italian neoclassical painter (died 1844)
- January 31 – Henry Howard, English portrait and history painter (died 1847)
- March 4 – Ellen Sharples, English painter who specialized in portraits and watercolor miniatures (died 1849)
- March 9 – Adélaïde Binart, French neoclassical painter (died 1832)
- March 19 – Jacques François Joseph Swebach-Desfontaines, French painter and draughtsman (died 1823)
- April 3 – Josiah Wedgwood II, English pottery owner, son of Josiah Wedgwood (died 1843)
- April 13 – Sir Thomas Lawrence, English portrait painter (died 1830)
- April 23 – Cornelia Scheffer, Dutch painter and portrait miniaturist (died 1839)
- June 26 – Robert Hills, English painter and etcher (died 1844)
- September 11 – Johann Erdmann Hummel, German painter (died 1852)
- September 19 – George Raper, English naval officer and nature artist (died 1797)
- October 18 – Jacques-Luc Barbier-Walbonne, French historical and portrait painter (died 1860)
- October 23 – James Ward, English painter, primarily of animals, and engraver (died 1859)
- December 9 – Adèle Romany, French painter (died 1846)
- December 23 – Sir Martin Archer Shee, British portrait painter (died 1850)
- December 29 – Robert Havell, Sr., English engraver and publisher (died 1832)
- date unknown
  - Thomas Barker, British painter of landscape and rural life (died 1847)
  - Pierre Charles Cior, French painter of historical subjects, portraits and miniatures (died c. 1838)
  - William Cuming, Irish portrait painter (died 1852)
  - Bartolomé Montalvo, Spanish painter specializing in landscapes, hunted animals and still lifes (died 1846)
  - François Mulard, French neoclassical painter (died 1850)
  - Karl Postl, Austrian painter (died 1818)
  - Sin Wi, Korean painter in the literary artist's style of the late Joseon period (died 1847)
  - Toyokuni, Japanese master of ukiyo-e, especially Kabuki actor prints (died 1825)

== Deaths ==
- March 22 - Jean-Charles François, French engraver (born 1717)
- May 11 - Francesco Carlo Rusca, Italian painter (born 1701)
- May 31 - Francesco Fontebasso, Italian painter of the late-Baroque or Rococo period of Venice (born 1707)
- June 24 – Jan Palthe, Dutch portrait painter (born 1717)
- August 17 – Giuseppe Bazzani, Italian painter of the Rococo (born 1690)
- October 13 – Vito D'Anna, Italian painter, one of the most important artists of Sicily (born 1718)
- November 4 – Andreas Brünniche, Danish portrait painter (born 1704)
- November 5 – Prince Hoare, English sculptor (born 1711)
- December 15 – Pierre-Antoine Baudouin, French miniature painter and engraver (born 1723)
- date unknown
  - Jacques-François Amand, French historical painter (born 1730)
  - Giuseppe Grisoni, painter and sculptor (born 1699)
  - Alexis Peyrotte, French decorator painter (born 1699)
  - Sim Sajeong, Korean genre works painter in the style of the Joseon period (born 1707)
- probable – Hakuin Ekaku, Japanese Zen master, noted for his painting and calligraphy (born 1685)
