= Second government of Segismundo Moret =

2nd government of Segismundo Moret
- Government of Spain
- 1906
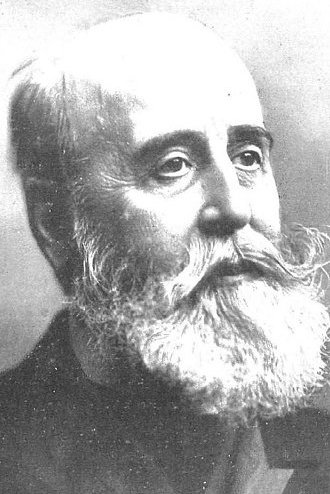
- Moret before 1909
- Date formed: 30 November 1906
- Date dissolved: 4 December 1906

People and organisations
- Monarch: Alfonso XIII
- Prime Minister: Segismundo Moret
- No. of ministers: 8 (Note: Does not include the prime minister.)
- Total no. of members: 8
- Member party: Liberal–Democratic
- Status in legislature: Majority (single-party)
- Opposition party: Conservative
- Opposition leader: Antonio Maura

History
- Predecessor: López Domínguez
- Successor: Vega de Armijo

The second government of Segismundo Moret was formed on 30 November 1906, following the latter's appointment as prime minister of Spain by King Alfonso XIII on 28 November and his swearing-in two days later, as a result of the "crisis of the letter" (crisis del papelito) having led to José López Domínguez's resignation from the post on 28 November. It succeeded the López Domínguez government and was the government of Spain from 30 November to 4 December 1906, a total of 4 days.

The cabinet comprised members of the Liberal–Democratic alliance, one independent and one military officer. In one of the shortest governments in Spanish history, Moret's entrustment of power caused widespread criticism: his move to send a letter to the King surreptitiously warning him against the perceived dangers of López Domínguez's Law of Associations—criticized by the Catholic Church as "anti-clerical" due to its restriction of religious orders—was perceived as a maneuver to disavow and bring down the late prime minister, prompting his resignation and earning Moret both distrust within his party and disapproval remarks from the monarch himself.

Having been rejected by several high-profile Liberal members during the cabinet's formation, internal turmoil within his party—with resignation threats from the presidents of the Congress and Senate (José Canalejas and Eugenio Montero Ríos, respectively) and the tabling of a motion of no confidence in the Senate by members of his own group—forced Moret to preemptively resign on 3 December to avoid a major parliamentary defeat.

== Formation ==
=== Overview ===
The Spanish Constitution of 1876 enshrined Spain as a semi-constitutional monarchy during the Restoration period, awarding the monarch—under the royal prerogative—the power to appoint government members (including the prime minister); the ability to grant or deny the decree of dissolution of the Cortes, or the adjournment of legislative sessions, to the incumbent or aspiring government that requested it; and the capacity to inform, inspect and ultimately control executive acts by granting or denying the signature of royal decrees; among others.

The monarch would play a key role in the turno system by appointing and dismissing governments, which would then organize elections to provide themselves with a parliamentary majority. As a result, governments during this period were dependent on royal confidence, which was frequently secured or lost based on the leaders' ability to guarantee the internal unity and parliamentary cohesion of their parties. In practice, the royal prerogative was not exercised freely by the monarch, but was carried out through the opening of a round of consultations—with the presidents of the chambers, the leaders of the main parties, the potential candidates and other notable figures—prior to government formation, or when prime ministers raised a matter of confidence to the monarch.

=== Cabinet crisis ===
King Alfonso XIII held a round of consultations on 28 November 1906 to determine a solution to the political crisis arising from López Domínguez's resignation.

Consultations; King of Spain
Date	Consultee	Office/position	Party
28 November 1906	Eugenio Montero Ríos	President of the Senate; Prime Minister (former)	Lib–Dem^{/Dem}
28 November 1906	José Canalejas	President of the Congress of Deputies	Lib–Dem^{/Dem}
28 November 1906	Marquis of Vega de Armijo	President of the Congress of Deputies (former)	Lib–Dem^{/Dem}
28 November 1906	Segismundo Moret	Prime Minister (former)	Lib–Dem^{/Lib}
28 November 1906	José López Domínguez	Prime Minister; President of the Senate (former)	Military
Nominations
Outcome →	Nomination of Segismundo Moret (Liberal) Accepted		

The outcome of the consultations led Alfonso XIII to entrust the formation of a new government to Segismundo Moret, who accepted the nomination.

== Council of Ministers ==
The Council of Ministers was structured into the office for the prime minister and eight ministries.

← Moret II Government → (30 November – 4 December 1906)
Portfolio	Name	Party	Took office	Left office	Ref.
Prime Minister	Segismundo Moret	Lib–Dem^{/Lib}	30 November 1906	4 December 1906	
Minister of State	Juan Pérez-Caballero	Lib–Dem^{/Lib}	30 November 1906	4 December 1906	
Minister of Grace and Justice	Antonio Barroso y Castillo	Lib–Dem^{/Dem}	30 November 1906	4 December 1906	
Minister of War	Agustín de Luque	Military	30 November 1906	4 December 1906	
Minister of the Navy	Santiago Alba	Lib–Dem^{/Lib}	30 November 1906	4 December 1906	
Minister of Finance	Eleuterio Delgado	Lib–Dem^{/Lib}	30 November 1906	4 December 1906	
Minister of Governance	Benigno Quiroga	Lib–Dem^{/Lib}	30 November 1906	4 December 1906	
Minister of Public Instruction and Fine Arts	Pedro Rodríguez de la Borbolla	Lib–Dem^{/Lib}	30 November 1906	4 December 1906	
Minister of Development	Rafael Gasset	Independent	30 November 1906	4 December 1906	

== Bibliography ==
- Constitución de la Monarquía Española (PDF) (Constitution). Madrid Gazette (in Spanish). King of Spain. 30 June 1876.
- Soldevilla, Fernando (1907). El Año Político 1906 (in Spanish). Madrid: National Library of Spain.
- Dendle, Brian John (1986). "Galdós in context: The Republican Years, 1907-1914". Anales Galdosianos (21). Alicante: Miguel de Cervantes Virtual Library: 33–44. ISSN 0569-9924.
- Calero, Antonio María (1987). "La prerrogativa regia en la Restauración: teoría y práctica (1875-1902)" (PDF). Revista de Estudios Políticos (in Spanish) (55). Madrid: Centre for Political and Constitutional Studies: 273–315. ISSN 0048-7694.
- Martorell Linares, Miguel Ángel (1997). "La crisis parlamentaria de 1913-1917. La quiebra del sistema de relaciones parlamentarias de la Restauración" (PDF). Revista de Estudios Políticos (in Spanish) (96). Madrid: Centre for Political and Constitutional Studies: 137–161. ISSN 0048-7694.

Preceded by López Domínguez	Government of Spain; 1906	Succeeded by Vega de Armijo
