= Port of Palermo by Moonlight =

Painting by Claude Joseph Vernet

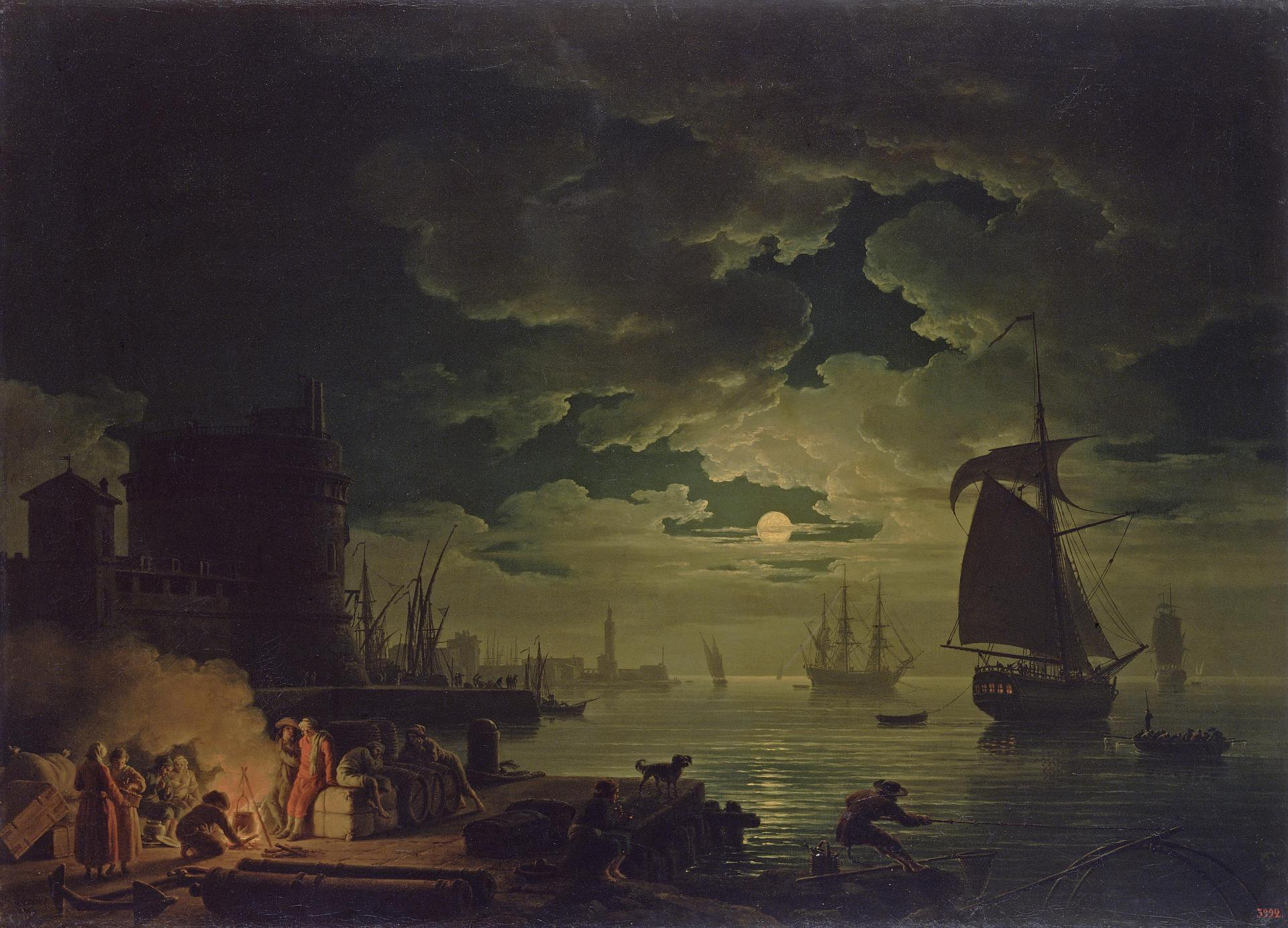
- Artist: Claude Joseph Vernet
- Year: 1769
- Medium: oil on canvas
- Dimensions: 99.5 cm × 138 cm (39.2 in × 54 in)
- Location: Hermitage Museum, Saint Petersburg

Port of Palermo by Moonlight is an oil painting on canvas by the French painter Claude-Joseph Vernet, from 1769. It is signed and dated lower left: "J. Vernet f 1769". The painting was originalled exhibited at the Salon of 1769 at the Louvre in Paris. It is held in the Hermitage Museum, in Saint Petersburg.

== Description ==
The painting depicts the entrance to the port of Palermo, in Sicily, by moonlight. In the foreground on the left, several people are warming themselves around a fire, while on the right, several silhouettes of ships stand out against the sea. On the left side, behind the group of people, Vernet painted the tower of the harbor fortress of Palermo. The sky is cloudy, mostly at the right, and the moon can be seen almost at the middle of the painting.

== Provenance ==
This painting was part of the Longvilliers collection, in Montreuil-sur-Seine, until 1769, then it was sold for the Boyer de Fonscolombe collection, in Aix-en-Provence, where it remained until 1791. It was bought by Alexander I of Russia, in 1803 in Saint-Petersburg through Pirling et Compagnie, from Dresden. The current painting has for counterpart a View of the Surroundings of Reggio in Calabria also kept in the Hermitage Museum.
