= Salon of 1769 =

1769 art exhibition in Paris

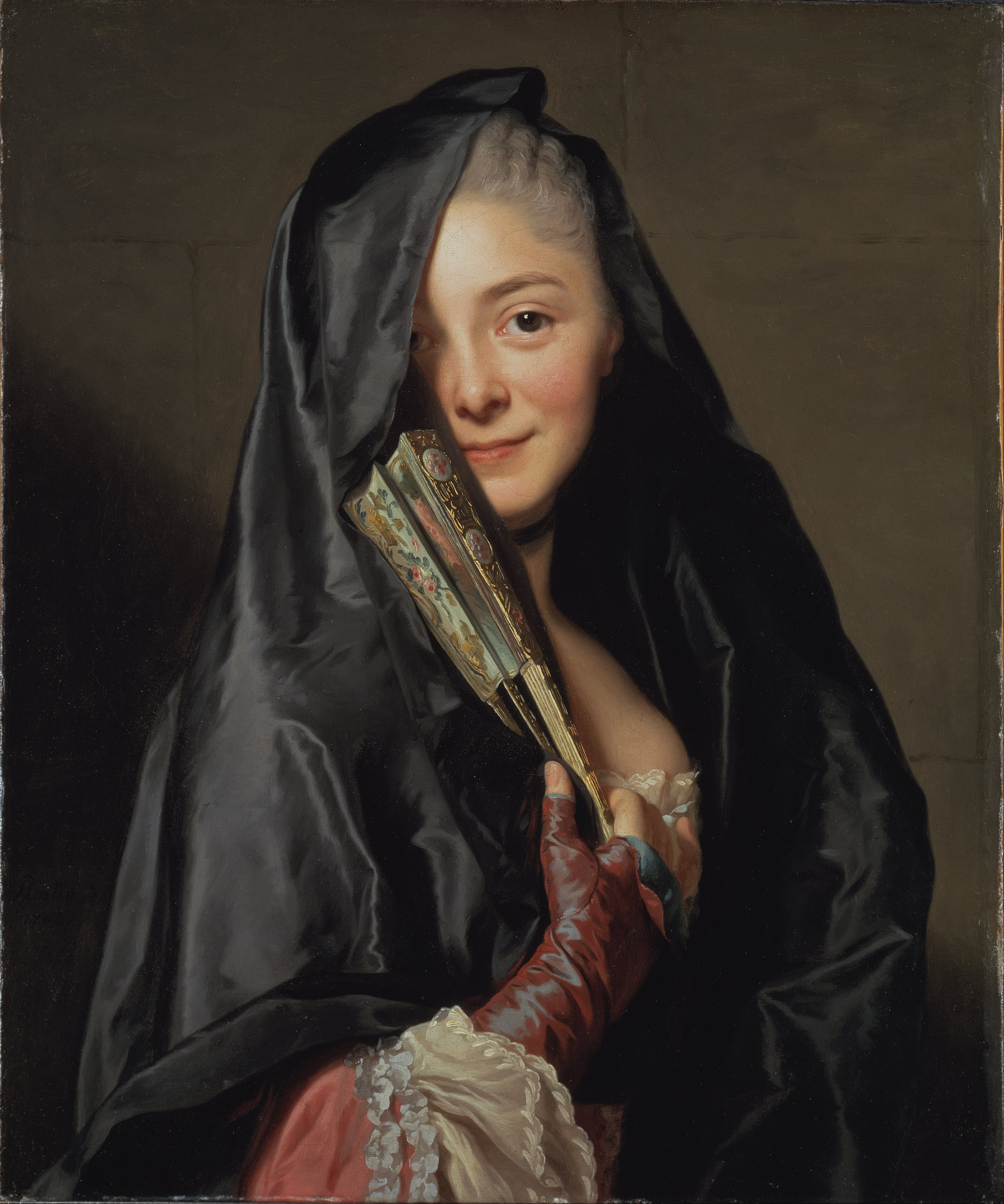
The Lady with the Veil by Alexander Roslin

The Salon of 1769 was an art exhibition held at the Louvre in Paris. Opening on 25 August 1769 it took place in the Salon Carré, the traditional location for the biannual Salon. It featured submissions from leading painters, sculptors and architects during the reign of Louis XV.

Amongst the paintings on display was The Lady with the Veil by Alexander Roslin featuring his wife Marie-Suzanne Giroust. She is shown Bolognese costume, her face partially obscured. Jean-Baptiste Greuze exhibited the neoclassical history painting Septimius Severus and Caracalla as well as a portrait of his fellow painter Étienne Jeaurat. Despite his desire to be taken seriously as a painter of history he was treated as a genre painter by the Salon. The portraitist Joseph Duplessis made his breakthrough, submitting a number of works including a picture of Madame Lenoir.

Joseph Vernet displayed the expressive Port of Palermo by Moonlight. The critic Denis Diderot identified works by Vernet and a fellow landscape painter Hubert Robert as reflecting the category of the "Sublime". It was the last Salon featuring François Boucher, the Premier peintre du Roi and one of the standard bearers of the rococo style. Over the coming decade, rococo would fall dramatically out of fashion as it was supplanted by the now dominant Neoclassicism.

== Gallery ==
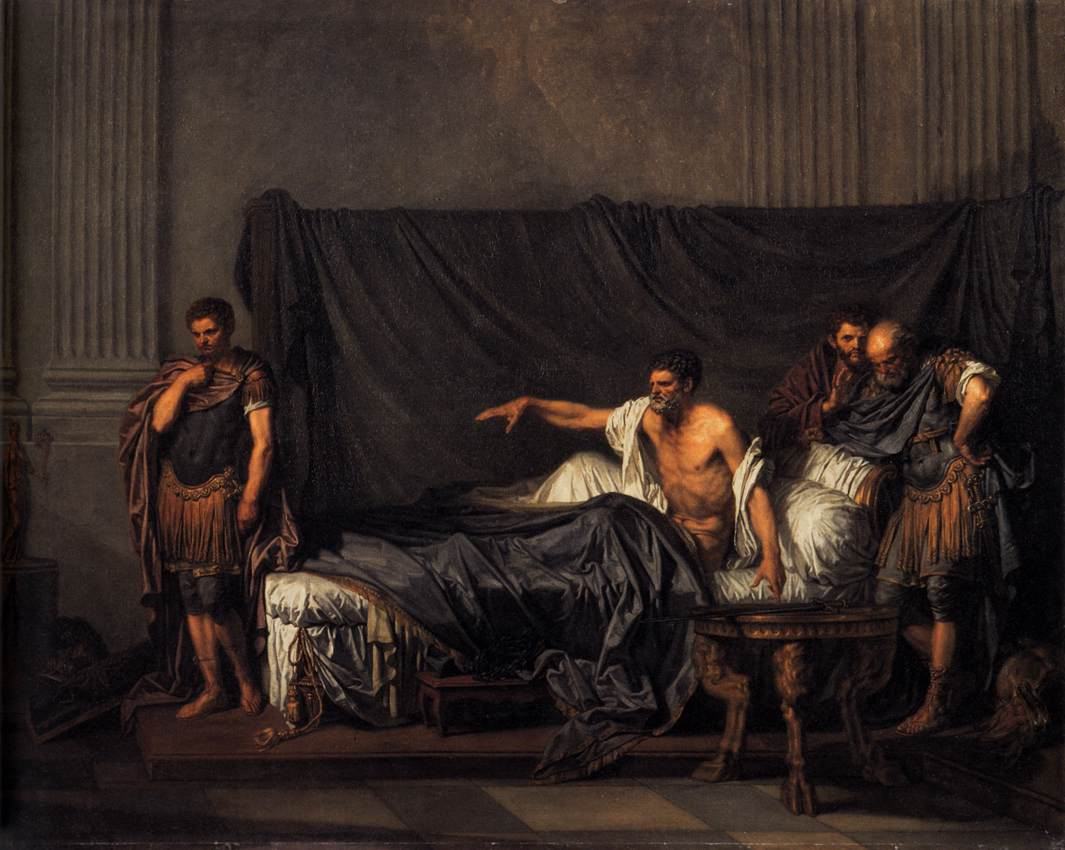
Septimius Severus and Caracalla by Jean-Baptiste Greuze

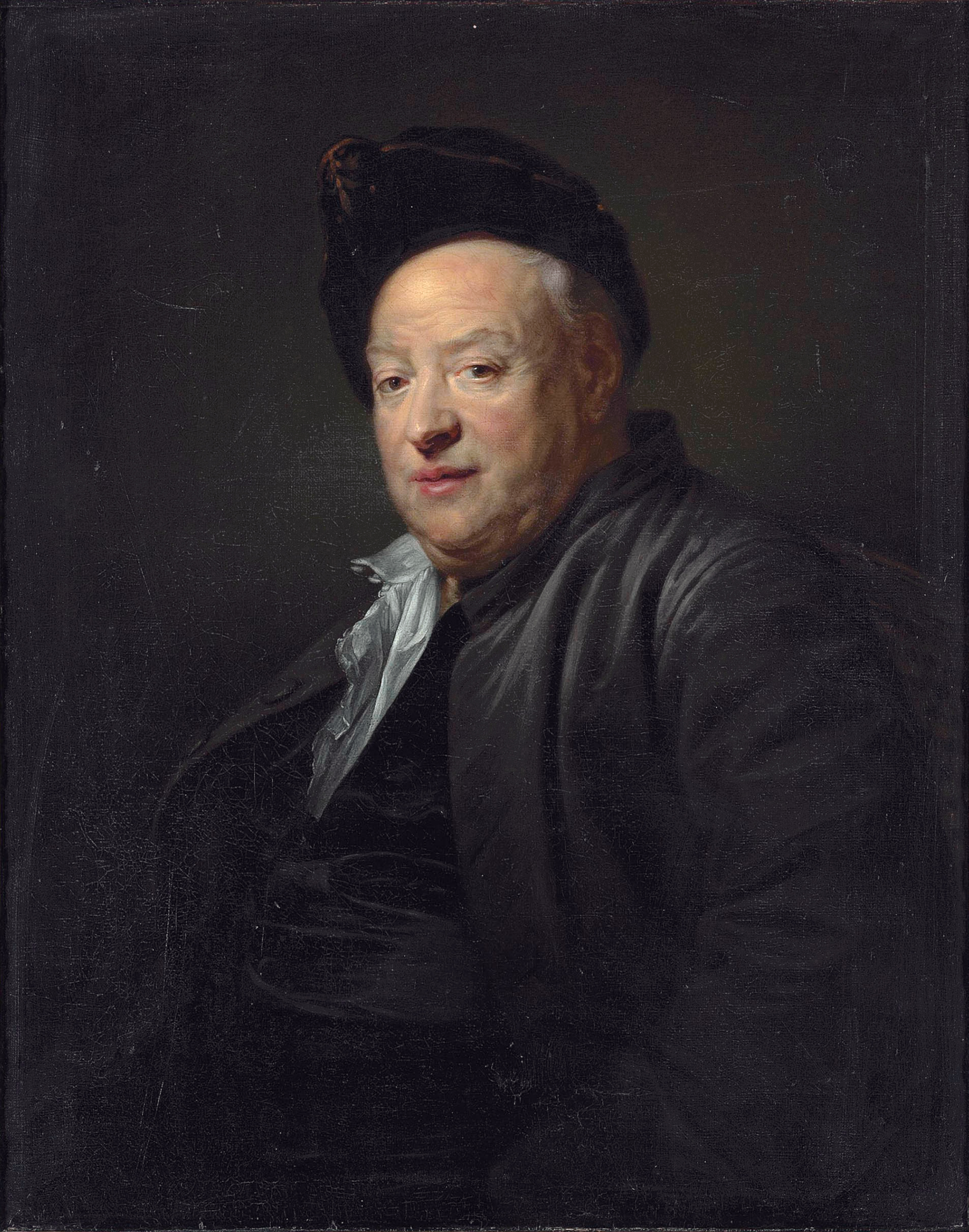
Portrait of Étienne Jeaurat by Jean-Baptiste Greuze

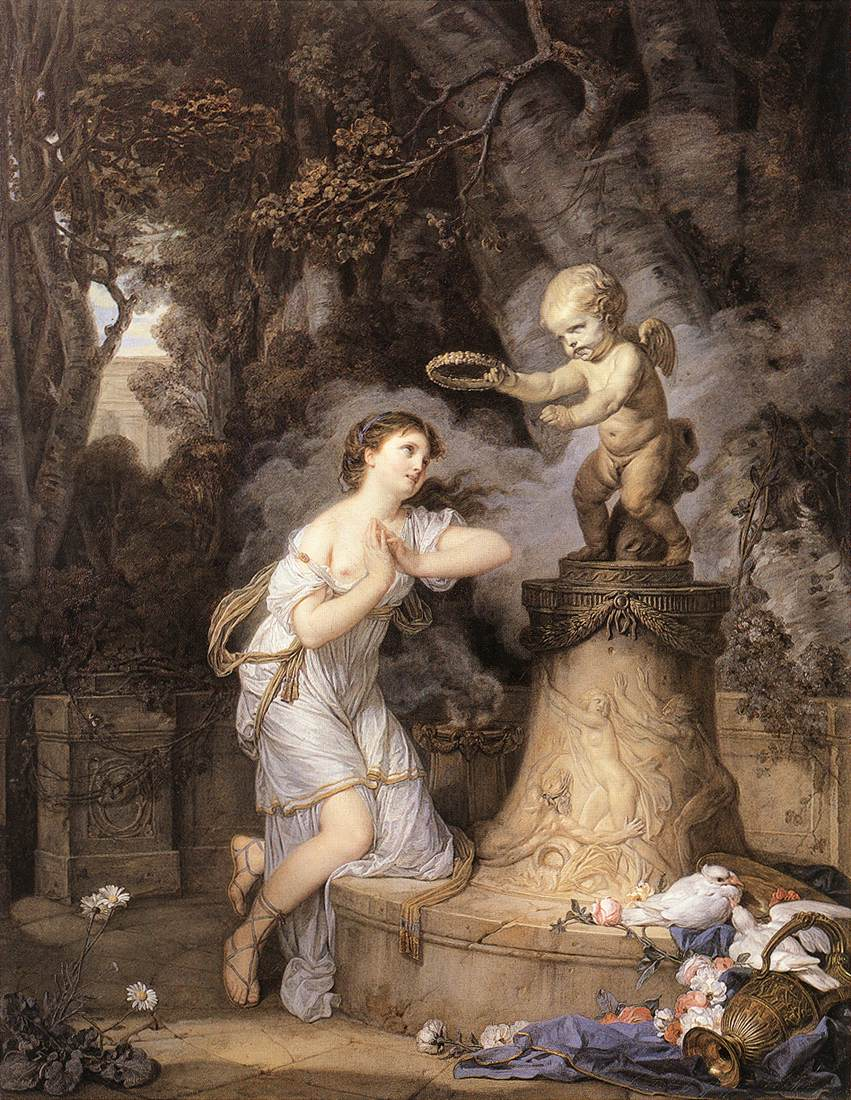
Votice Offering to Cupid by Jean-Baptiste Greuze

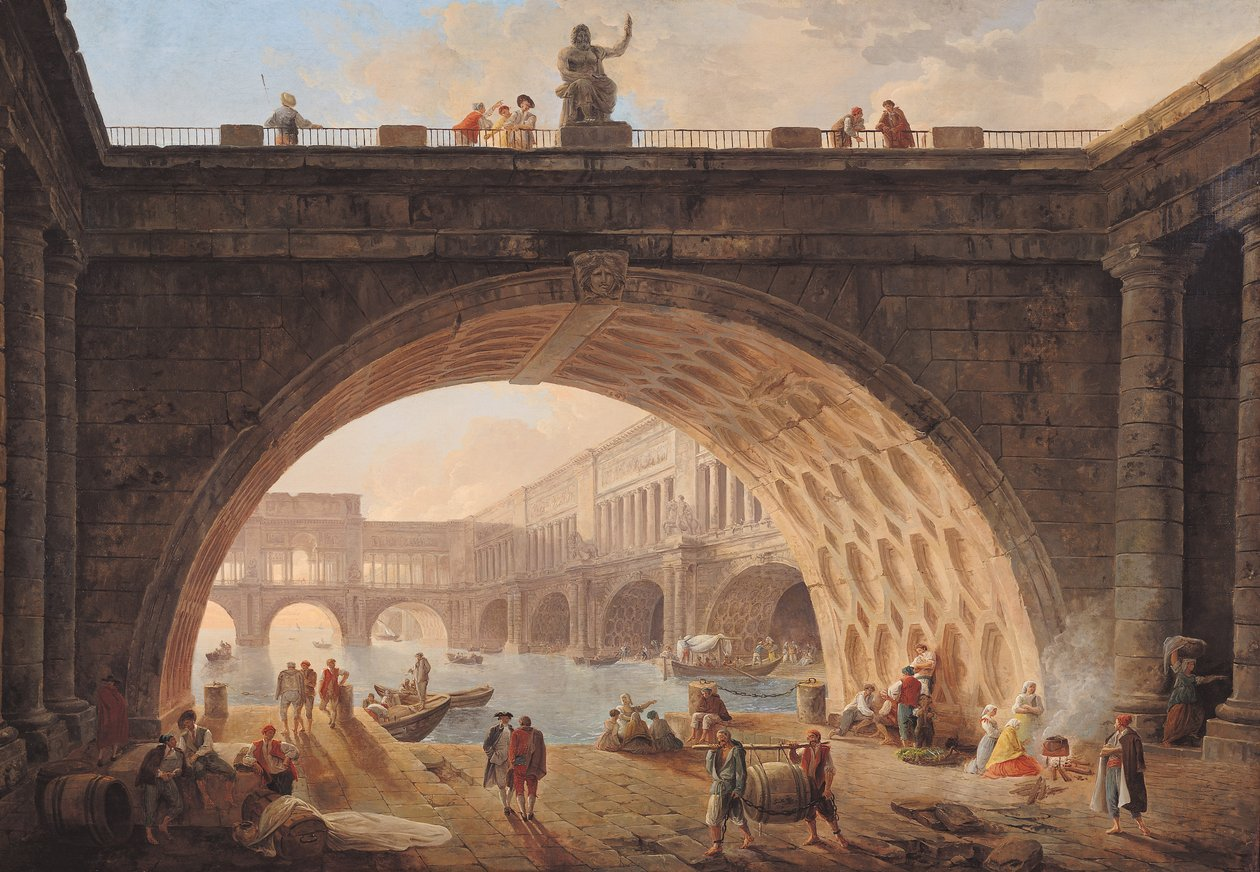
Un Port orné d’architecture by Hubert Robert

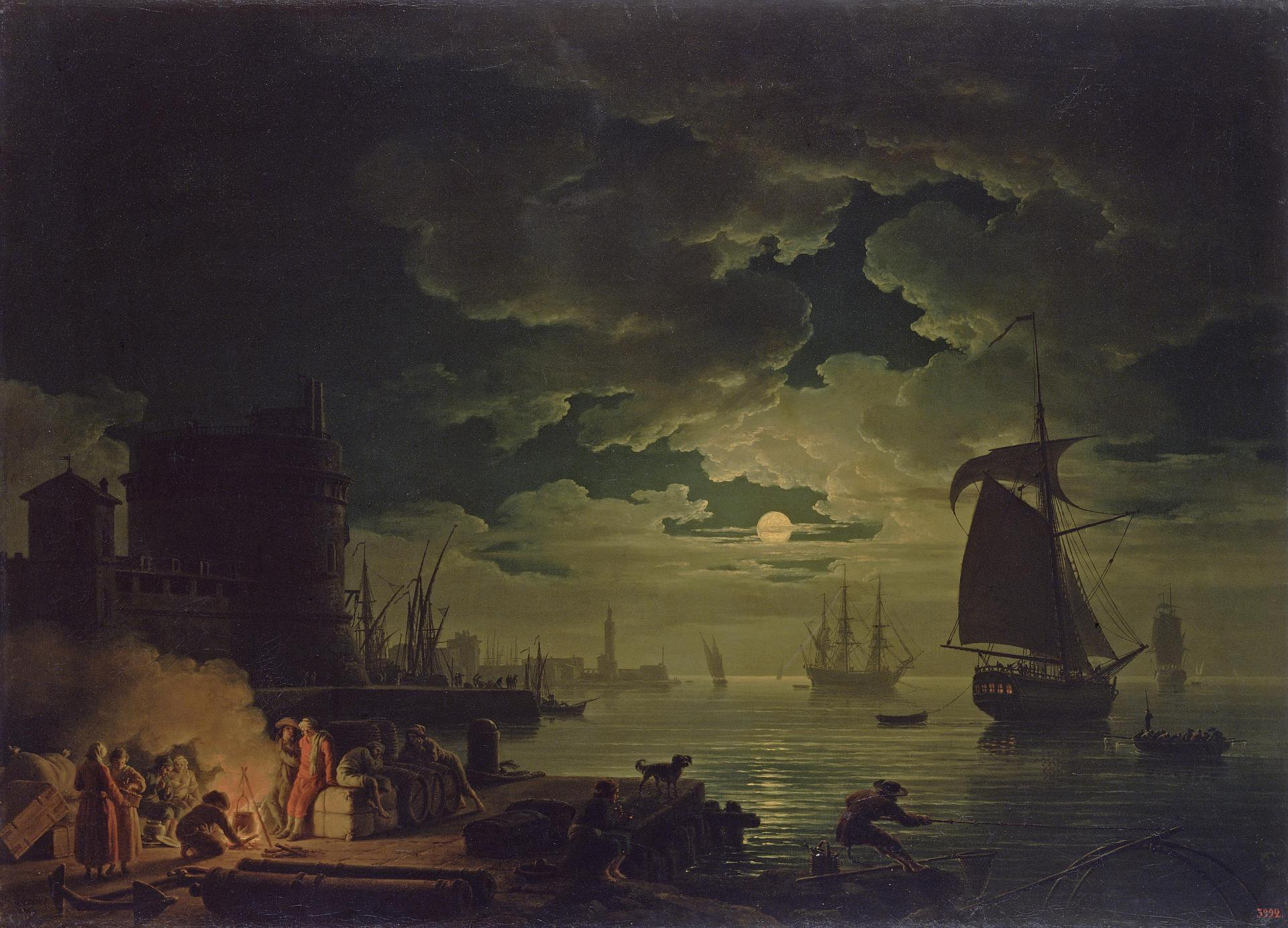
Port of Palermo by Moonlight by Claude-Joseph Vernet

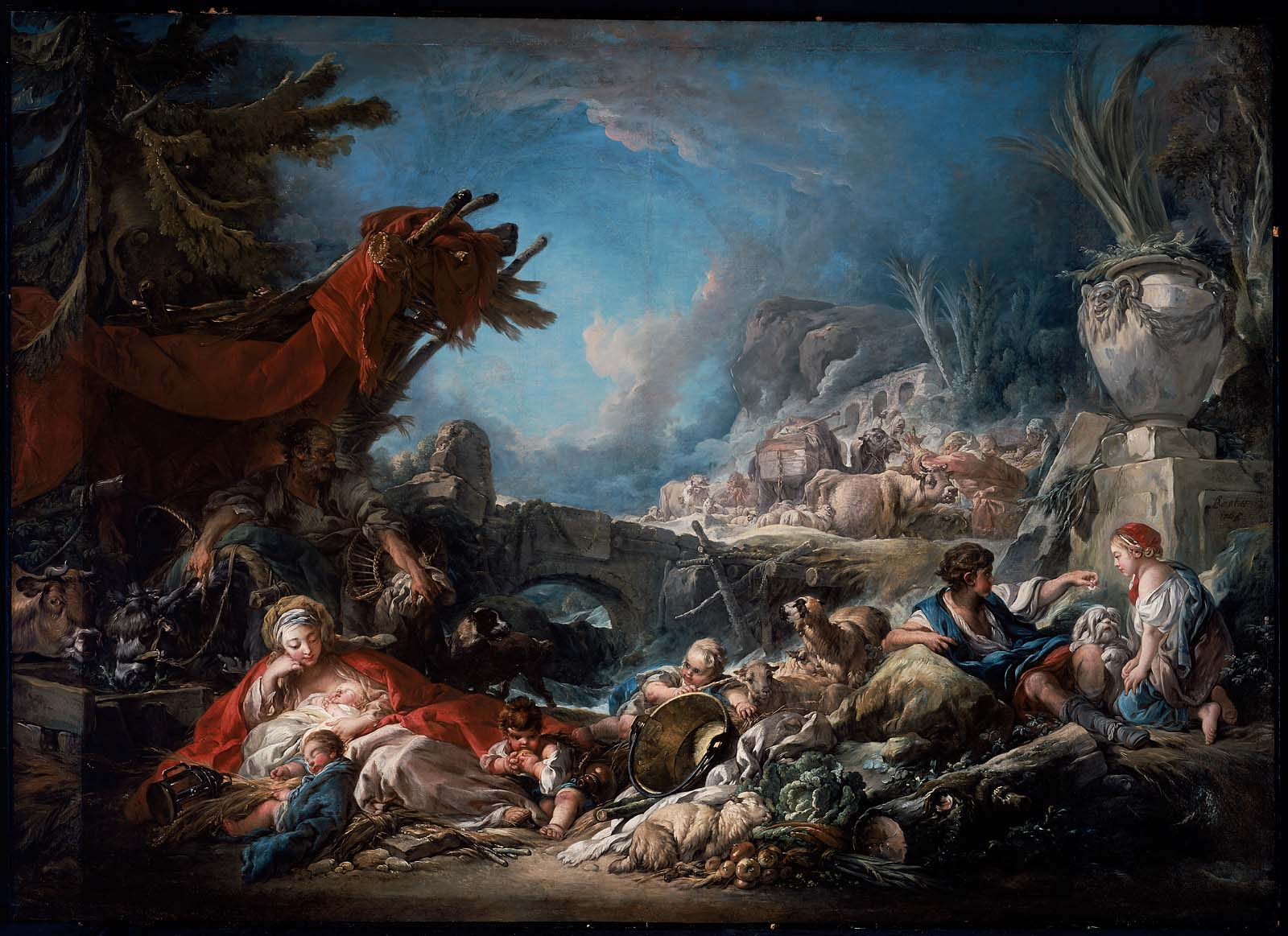
Halt at the Spring by François Boucher

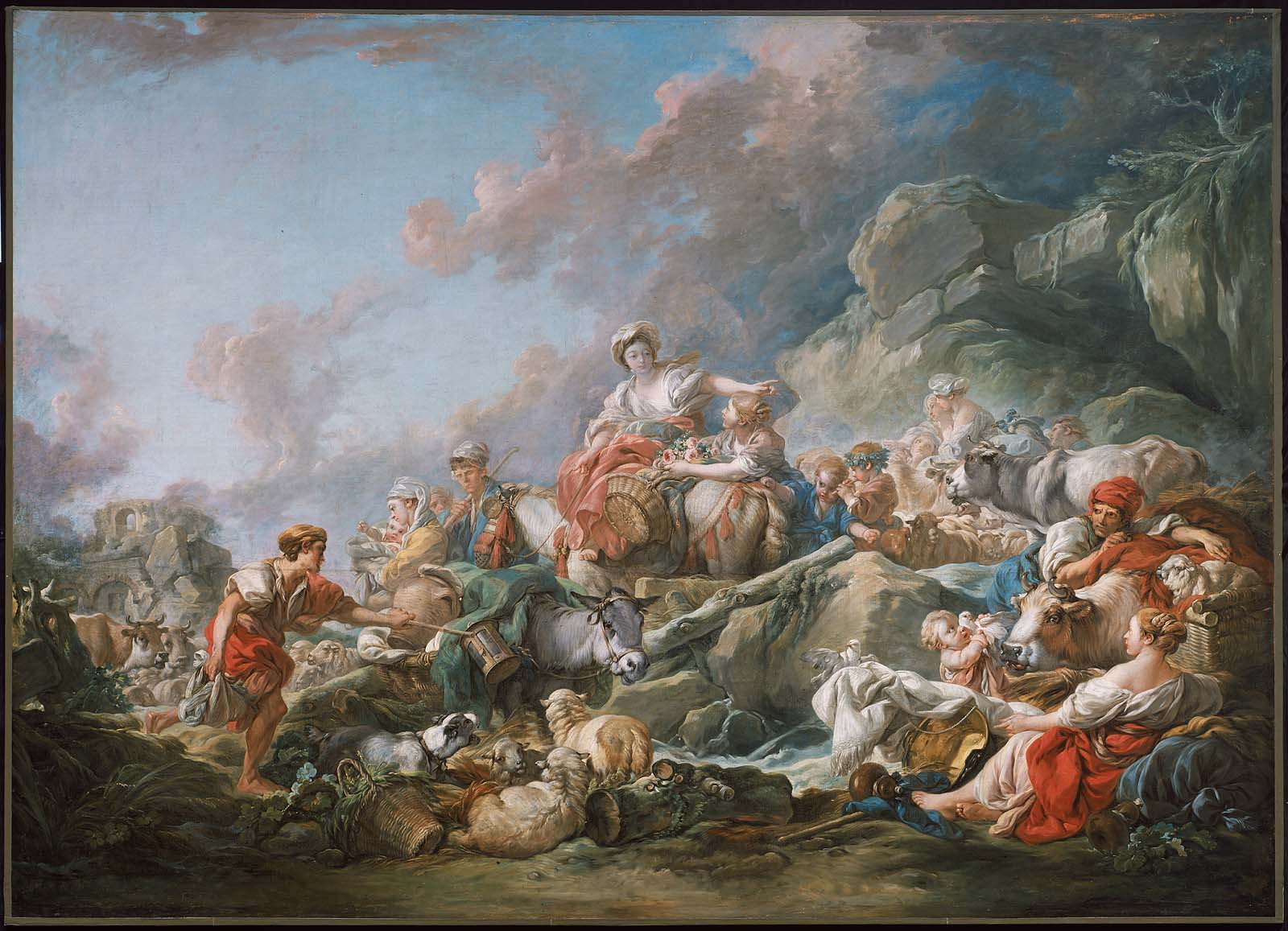
Return from Market by François Boucher

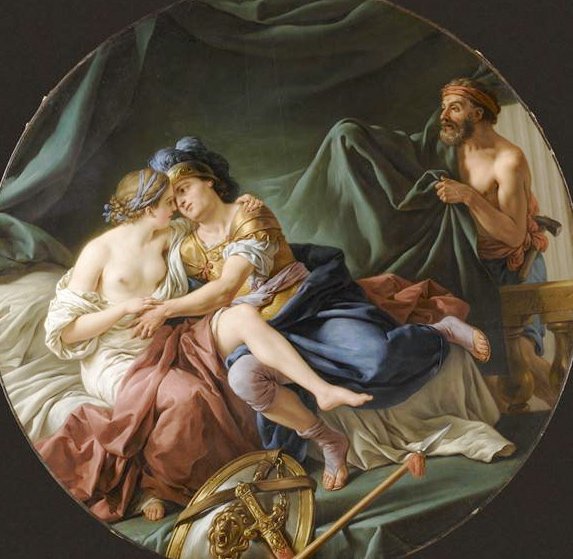
Mars and Venus Surprised by Vulcan by Louis-Jean-François Lagrenée

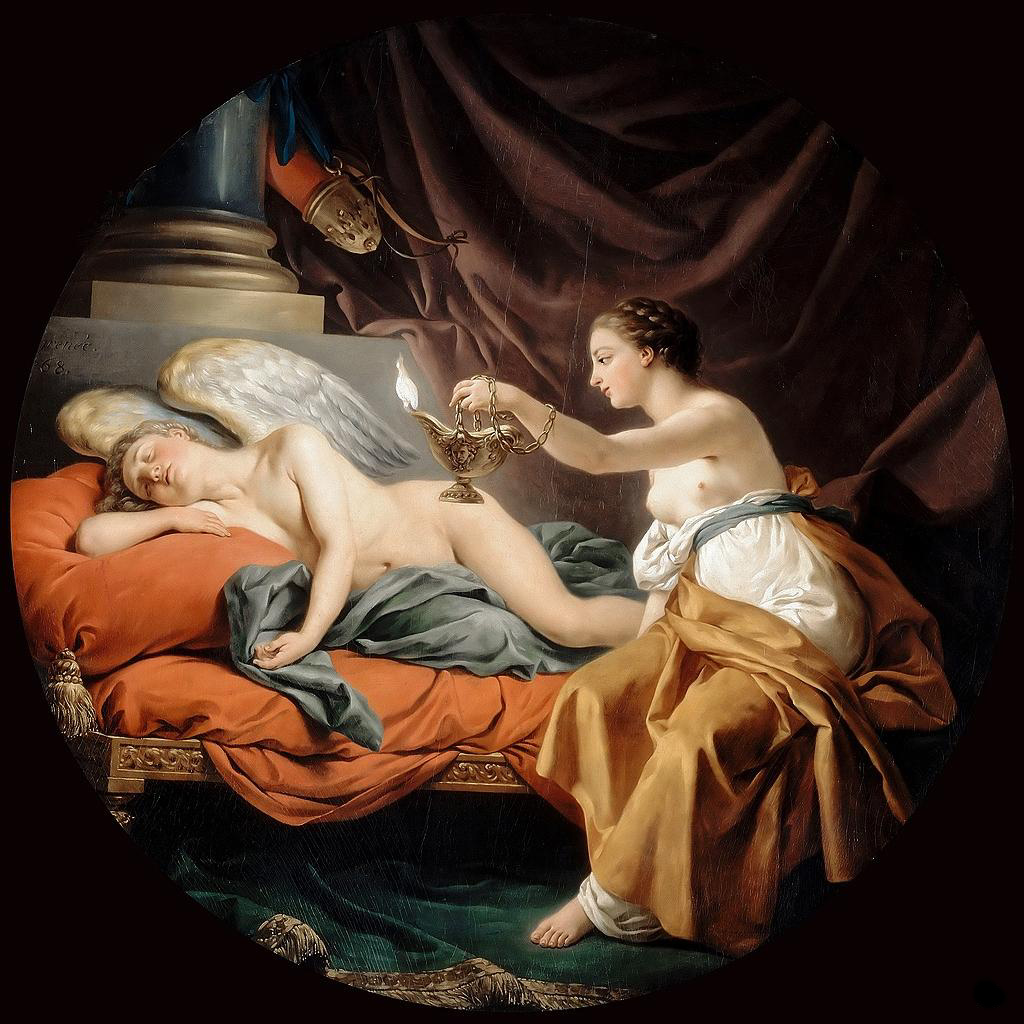
Psyche Surprises the Sleeping Cupid by Louis-Jean-François Lagrenée

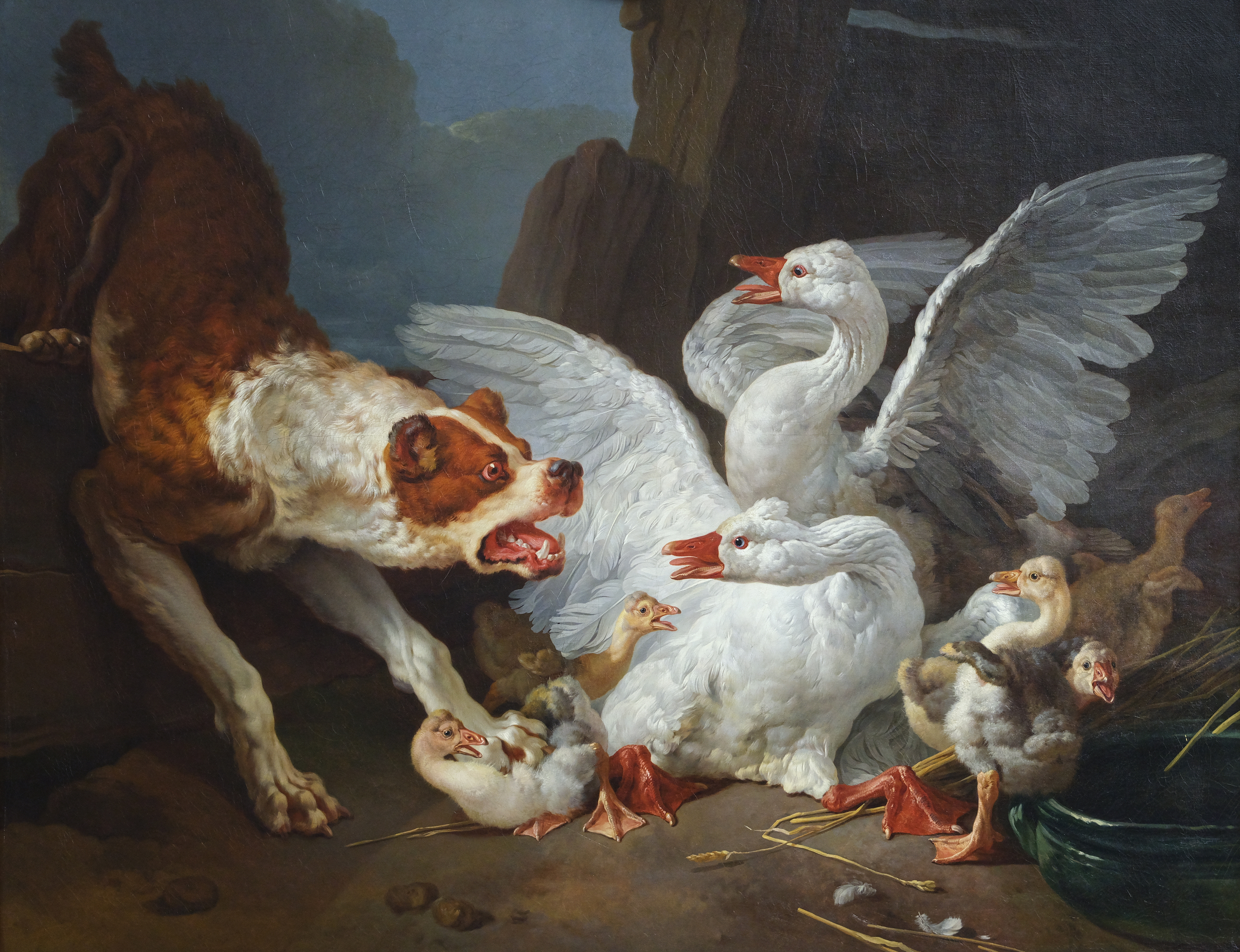
A Dog and Geese by Jean-Baptiste Huet

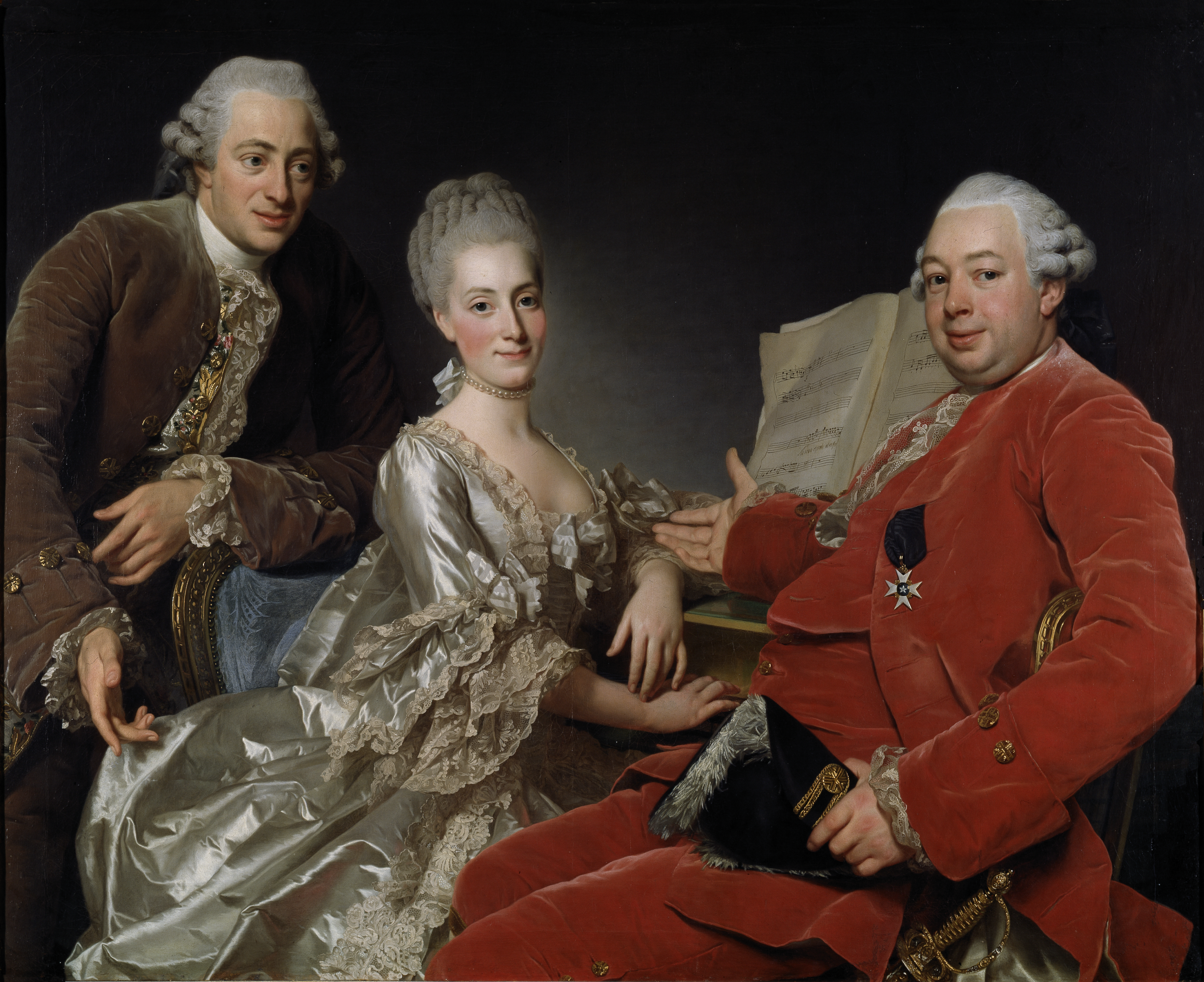
John Jennings, His Brother and Sister-in-Law by Alexander Roslin

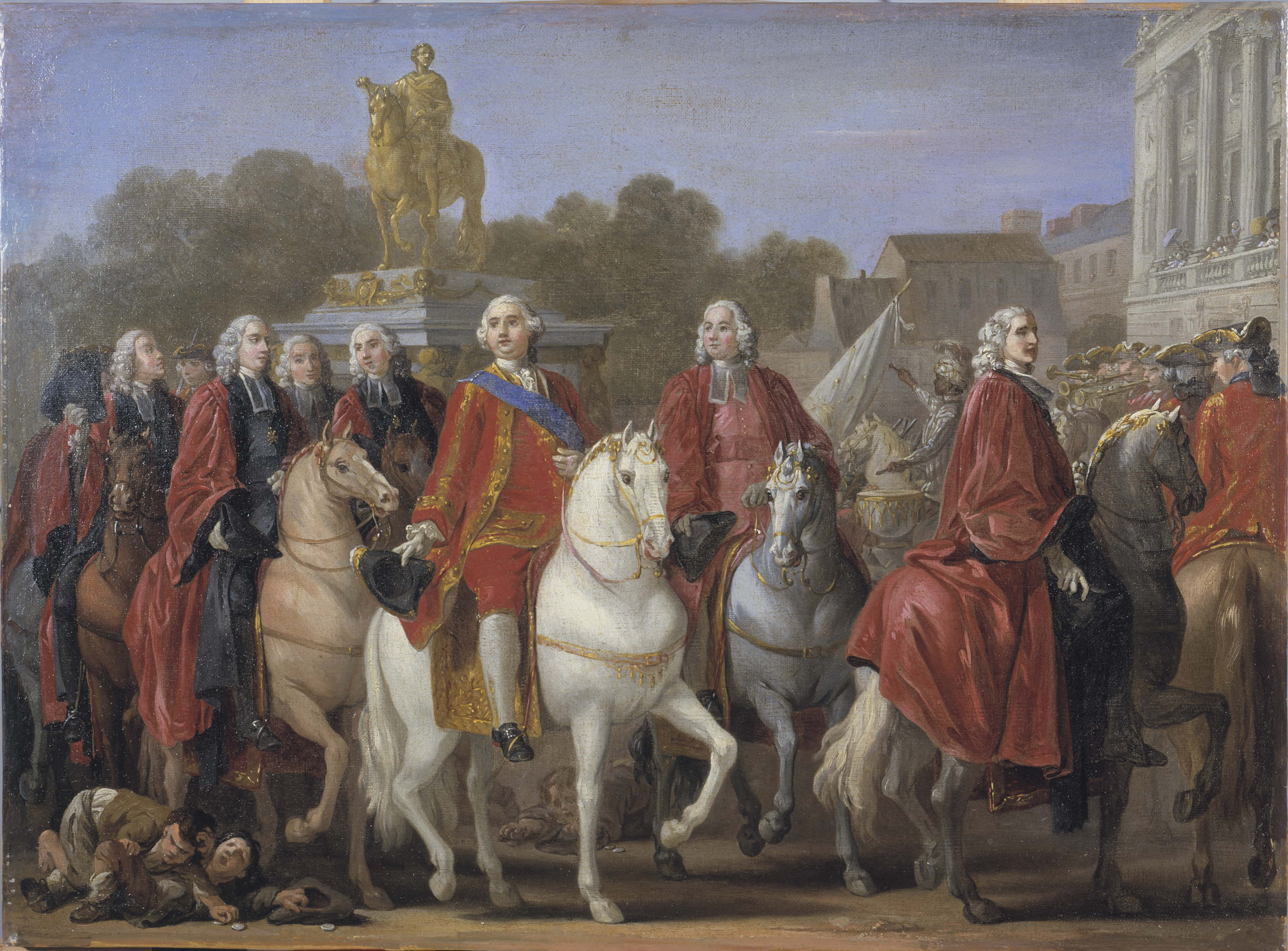
Inauguration of the Statue of Louis XV by Joseph-Marie Vien

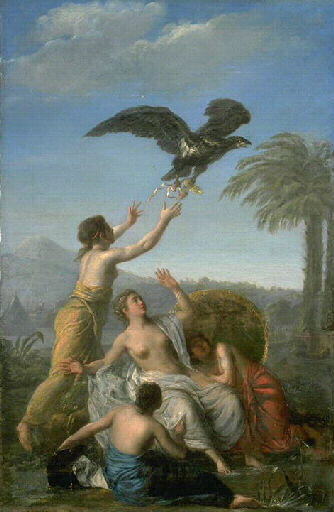
Theft of Rodope's Shoe by Michel Honoré Bounieu

The Silver Goblet by Jean-Baptiste-Siméon Chardin

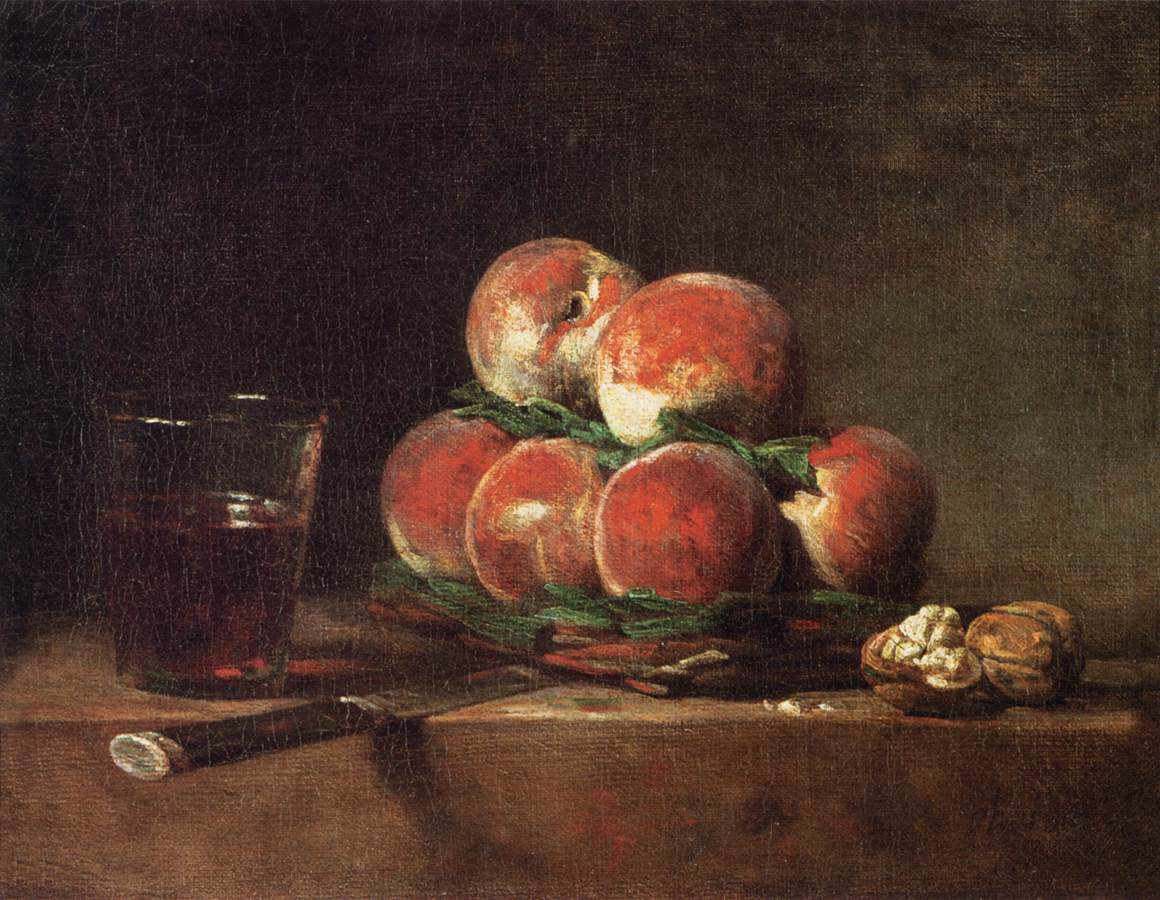
Basket of Peaches, with Walnuts, Knife and Glass of Wine by Jean-Baptiste-Siméon Chardin

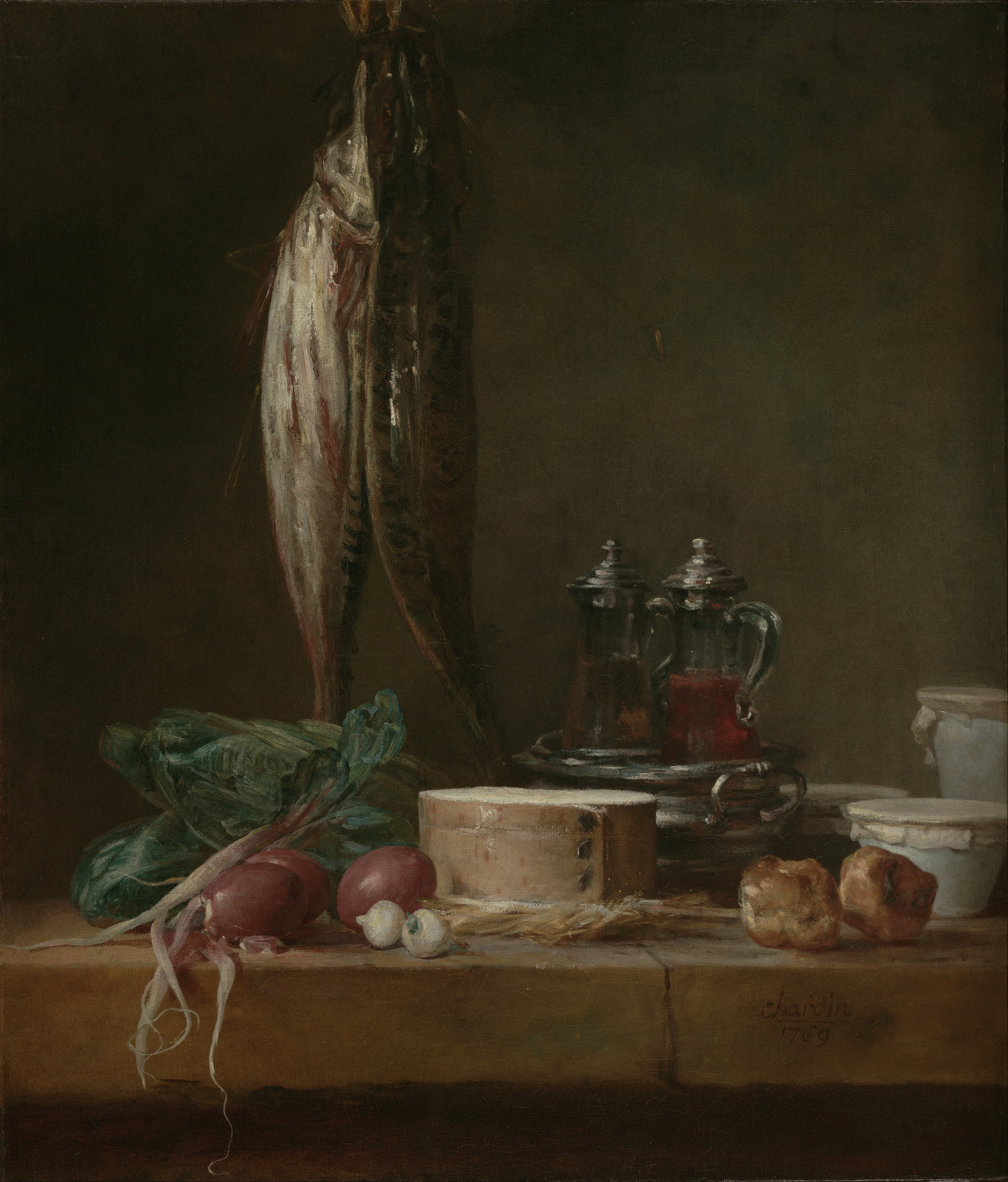
Still Life with Fish, Vegetables, Gougères, Pots, and Cruets on a Table by Jean-Baptiste-Siméon Chardin

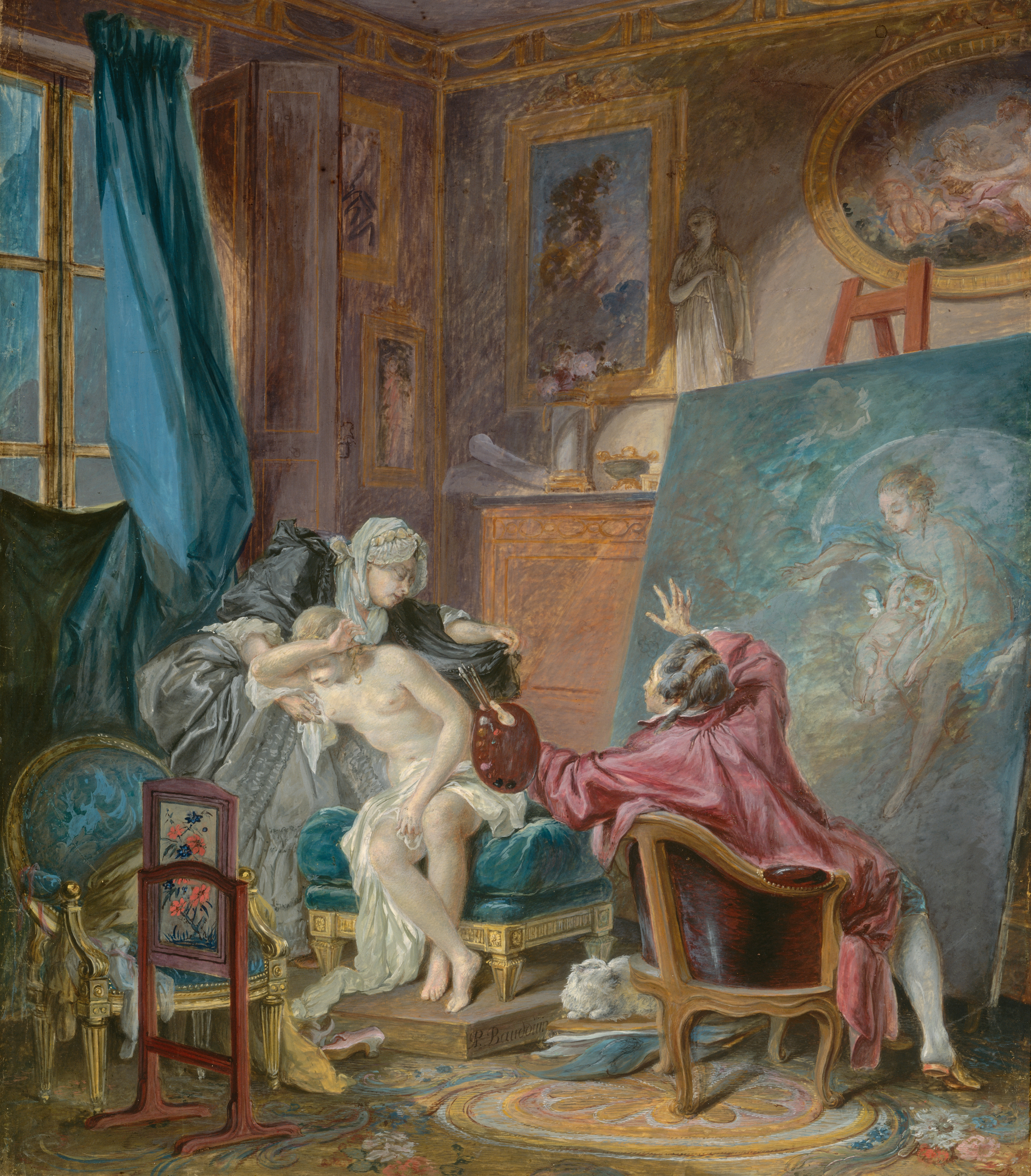
The Honest Model by Pierre-Antoine Baudouin

Portrait of Madame Lenoir by Joseph Duplessis

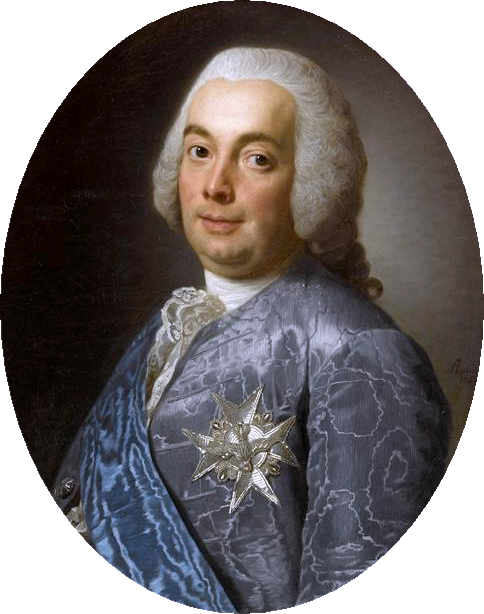
Portrait of Henri Bertin by Alexander Roslin

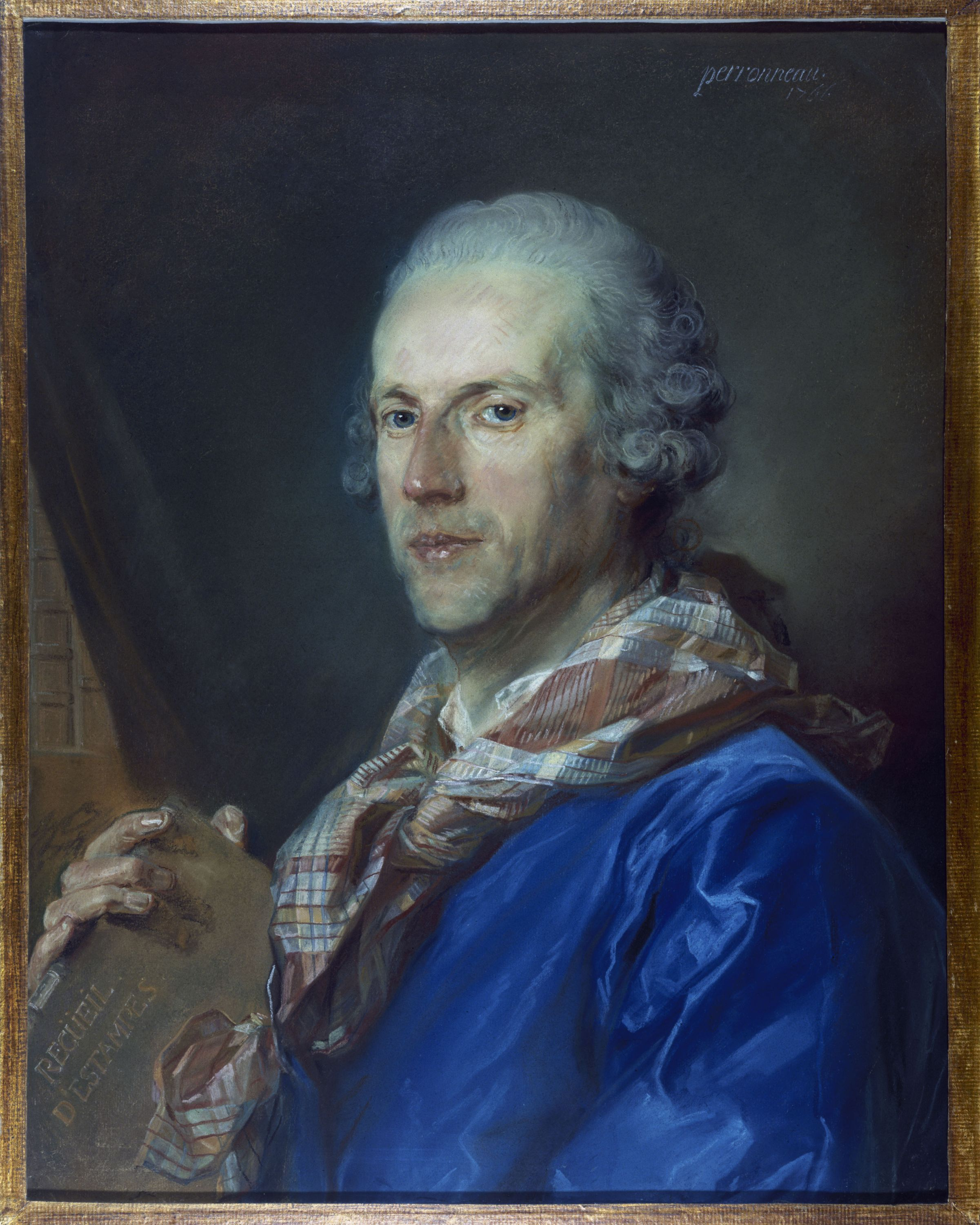
Portrait of Charles le Normant du Coudray by Jean-Baptiste Perronneau

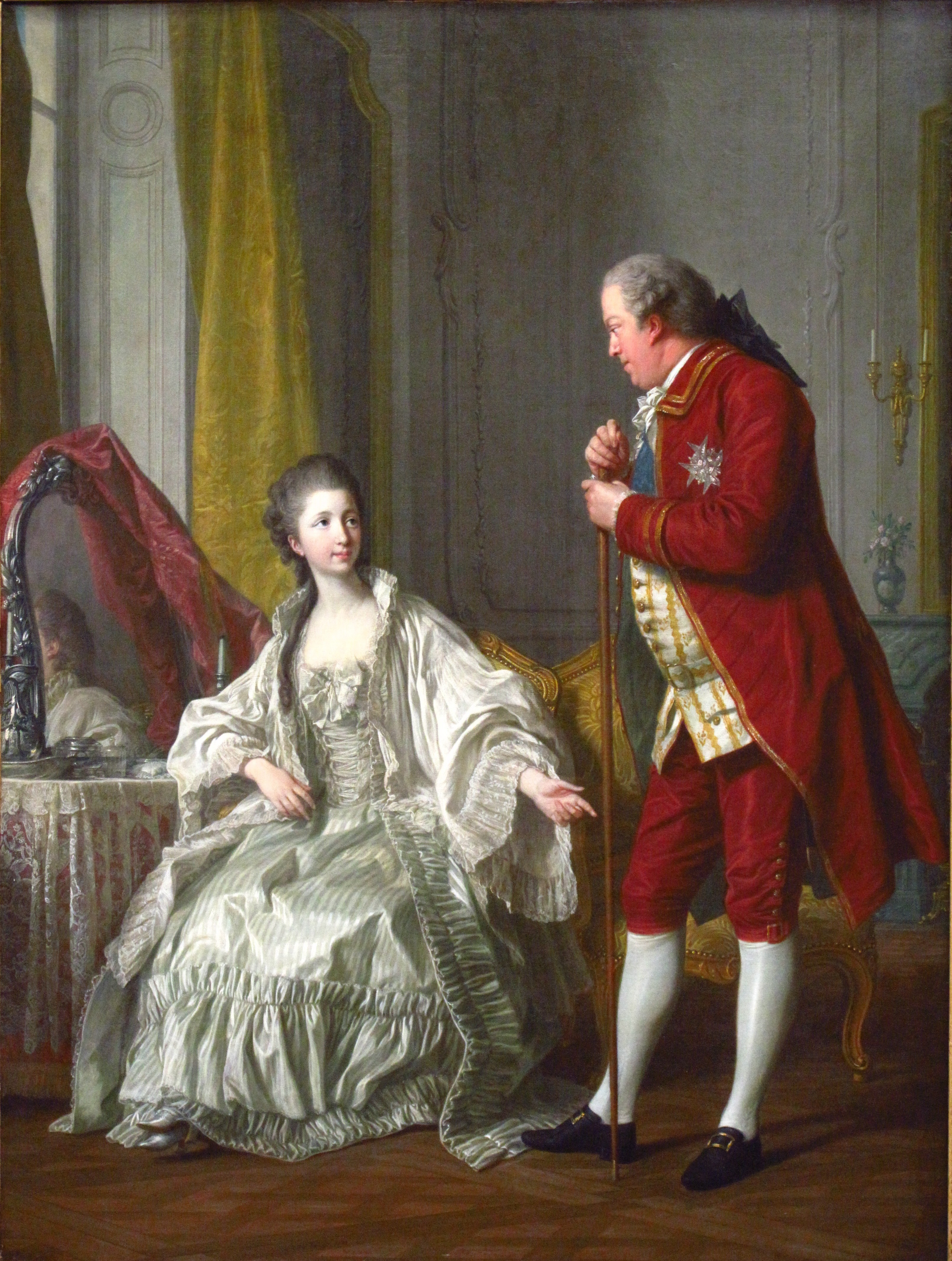
Portrait of the Marquis de Marigny and His Wife by Louis-Michel van Loo

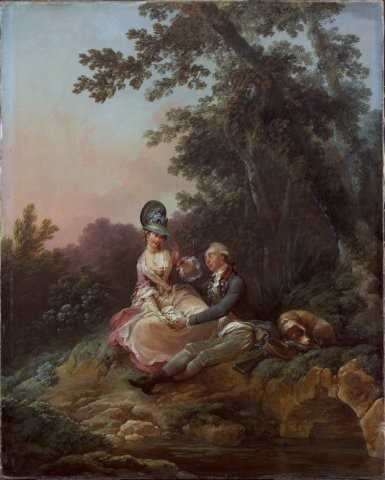
Deux amis qui font un goûter au retour de chasse by Philip James de Loutherbourg

The Waterfalls of Tivoli by Hubert Robert

== See also ==
- Royal Academy Exhibition of 1769, held in Pall Mall, London
- Society of Artists Exhibition of 1769, held in Spring Gardens, London

== Bibliography ==
- Baetjer, Katharine. French Paintings in The Metropolitan Museum of Art from the Early Eighteenth Century through the Revolution. Metropolitan Museum of Art, 2019.
- Conisbee, Philip. Painting in Eighteenth-century France. Cornell University Press, 1981
- Percival, Melissa. Fragonard and the Fantasy Figure: Painting the Imagination. Routledge, 2017. Rodopi, 2012.
- Pierce, Gillian B. Scapeland: Writing the Landscape from Diderot’s Salons to the Postmodern Museum.
- Wrightsman, Jayne. The Wrightsman Pictures. Metropolitan Museum of Art, 2005.
