= Bartolomé Montalvo =

Spanish painter (1769–1846)

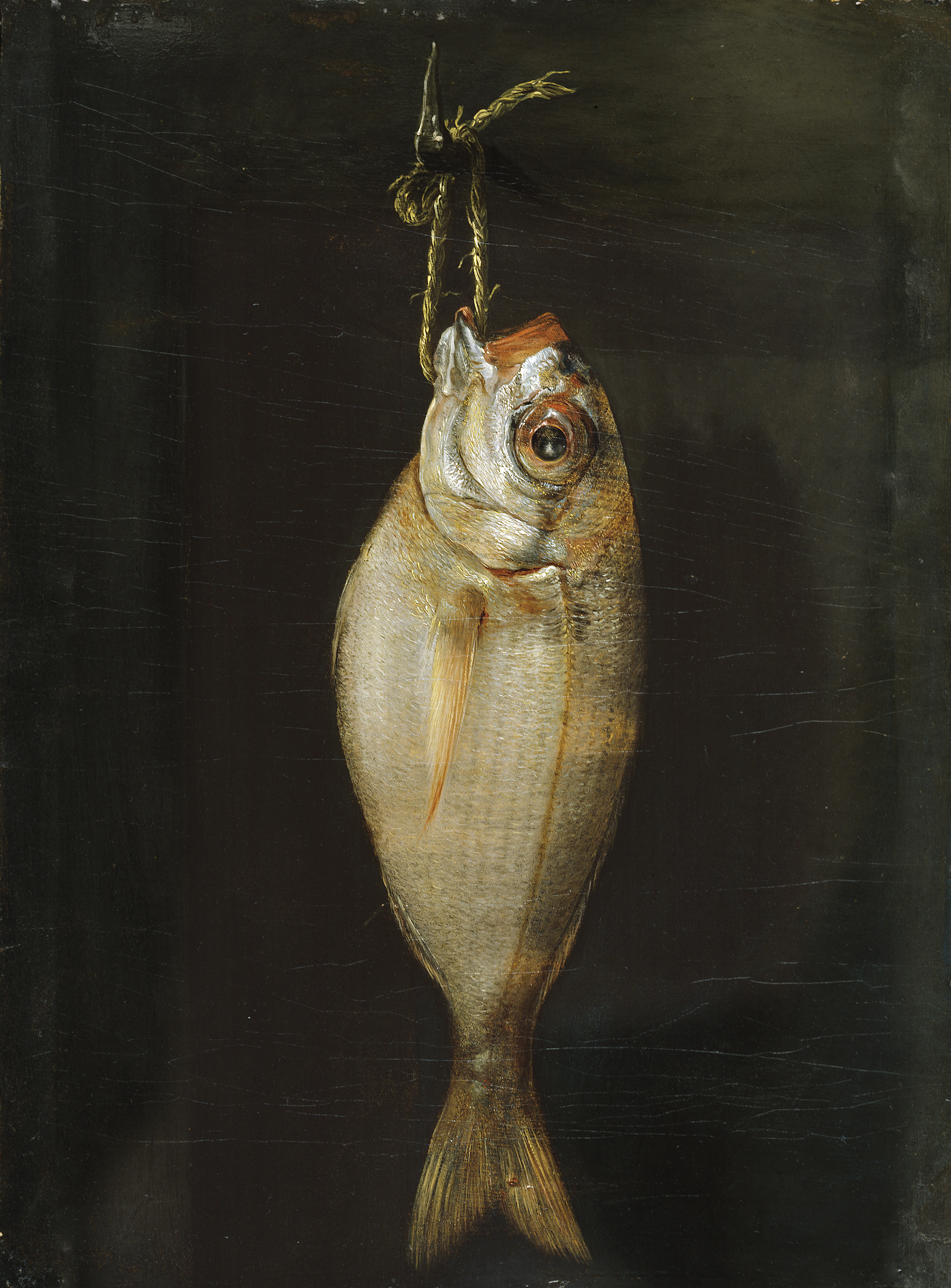
Bream by Bartolomé Montalvo, Museo del Prado

Bartolomé Montalvo (1769 – 11 August 1846) was a Spanish painter born in Sangarcía near Segovia. He was a pupil of Zacarías Velazquez. He was admitted to the Real Academia de Bellas Artes de San Fernando on 6 April 1814. In 1816 became pintor de cámara for King Fernando VII. He specialized in painting landscapes, hunted animals and still lifes (bodegones). When Montalvo died, he had been for years lieutenant director of the Academy.
