= Emperor Joseph II and Grand Duke Pietro Leopoldo of Tuscany =

Painting by Pompeo Batoni

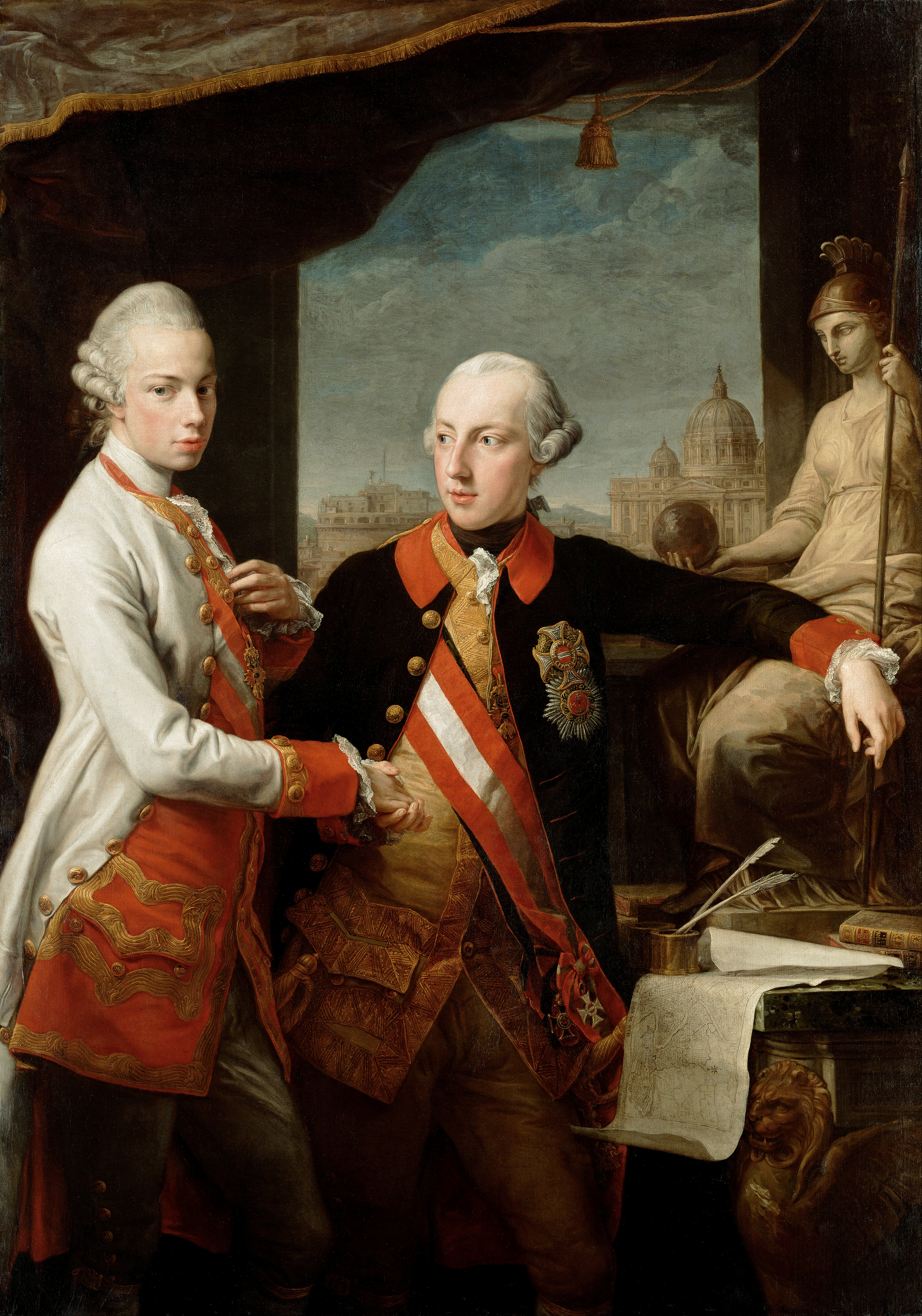
- Artist: Pompeo Batoni
- Year: 1769
- Type: Oil on canvas, portrait painting
- Dimensions: 173 cm × 120 cm (68.1 in × 48 in)
- Location: Kunsthistorisches Museum, Vienna

Emperor Joseph II and Grand Duke Pietro Leopoldo of Tuscany (German: Kaiser Joseph II. und Großherzog Pietro Leopoldo von Toskana) is a 1769 portrait painting by the Italian painter Pompeo Batoni. It is a dual portrait of Joseph II, Holy Roman Emperor and his younger brother Leopold, then Grand Duke of Tuscany but who would later succeed him as Holy Roman Emperor and ruler of the Habsburg monarchy in 1790.

Batoni was a noted portraitist based in Rome, who earned his name by painting British Grand Tourists but his reputation spread across Continental Europe and he was sought out by leading figures. The painting of the Habsburg brothers earned him considerable praise and it became one of the more famous images of the era. Today the painting is in the collection of the Kunsthistorisches Museum in Vienna.

== Bibliography ==
- Bowron, Edgar Peters & Kerber, Peter Björn. Pompeo Batoni: Prince of Painters in Eighteenth-century Rome. Yale University Press, 2007.
- Kugler, Johannes Kugler. Kunsthistorisches Museum Vienna. Pichler, 2006
- Milam, Jennifer D. Historical Dictionary of Rococo Art. Scarecrow Press, 2011.
