= Pierre Charles Cior =

French painter

- Born: 1769; Paris, France
- Known for: Painting
- Notable work: Historical subjects, portraits, miniatures

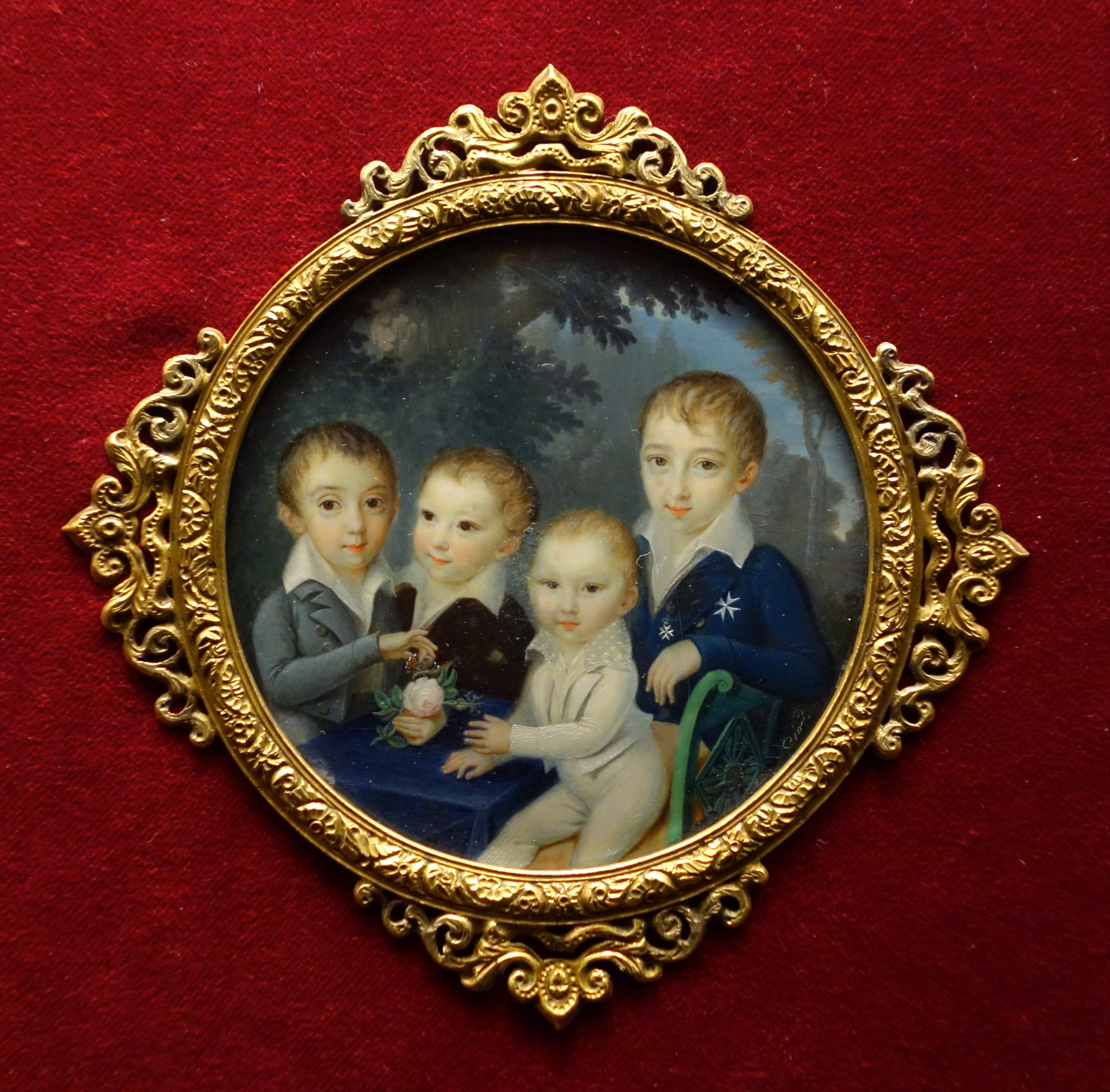
Four Young Boys by Pierre Charles Cior, c. 1800–1810

Pierre Charles Cior (1769 – after 1838), a French painter of historical subjects, portraits, and miniatures, was born in Paris. He was a pupil of Bauzin, and became miniature painter to the king of Spain. He died in 1838.
