= Portrait of Capability Brown =

1769 painting by Nathaniel Dance-Holland

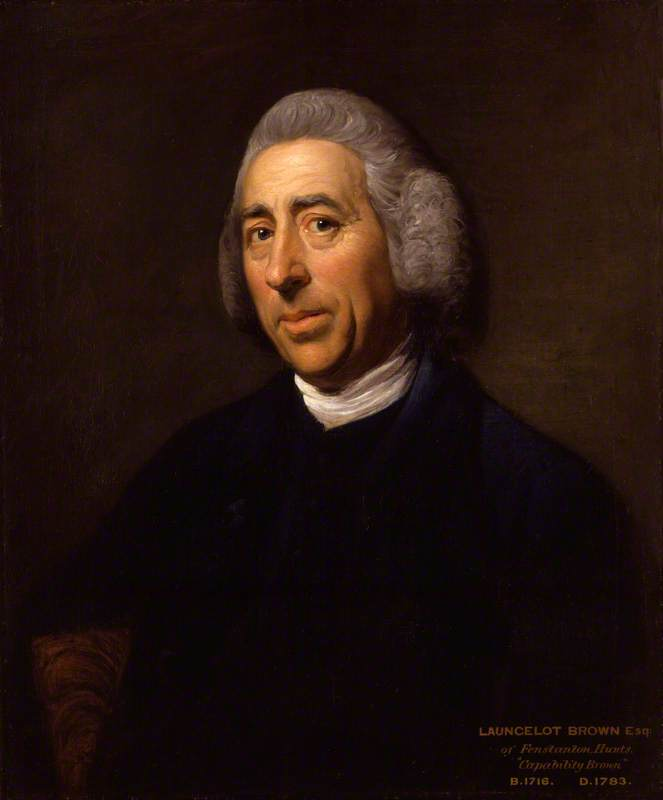
- Artist: Nathaniel Dance-Holland
- Year: c. 1769
- Type: Oil on canvas, portrait
- Dimensions: 75.2 cm × 63.2 cm (29.6 in × 24.9 in)
- Location: National Portrait Gallery, London

Portrait of Capability Brown is an oil on canvas portrait painting by the English artist Nathaniel Dance-Holland, from 1769. It depicts the renowned landscape gardener Lancelot "Capability" Brown. Brown was known for promoting the English landscape garden design in contrast to the previously dominant and more regimented French landscape garden style. Dance-Holland was a noted portraitist of the Georgian era and a founder member of the Royal Academy of Arts.

Today the work is in the collection of the National Portrait Gallery, in London, having been acquired in 1989. A version of the painting is at Burghley House in Cambridgeshire where Brown did work for the Earl of Exeter over many years.

== Bibliography ==
- Brown, Jane. Lancelot 'Capability' Brown: The Omnipotent Magician, 1716-1783. Random House, 2012.
- Wright, Christopher. British and Irish Paintings in Public Collections: An Index of British and Irish Oil Paintings by Artists Born Before 1870 in Public and Institutional Collections in the United Kingdom and Ireland. Yale University Press, 2006.
