= John Jennings, His Brother and Sister-in-Law =

Painting by Alexander Roslin

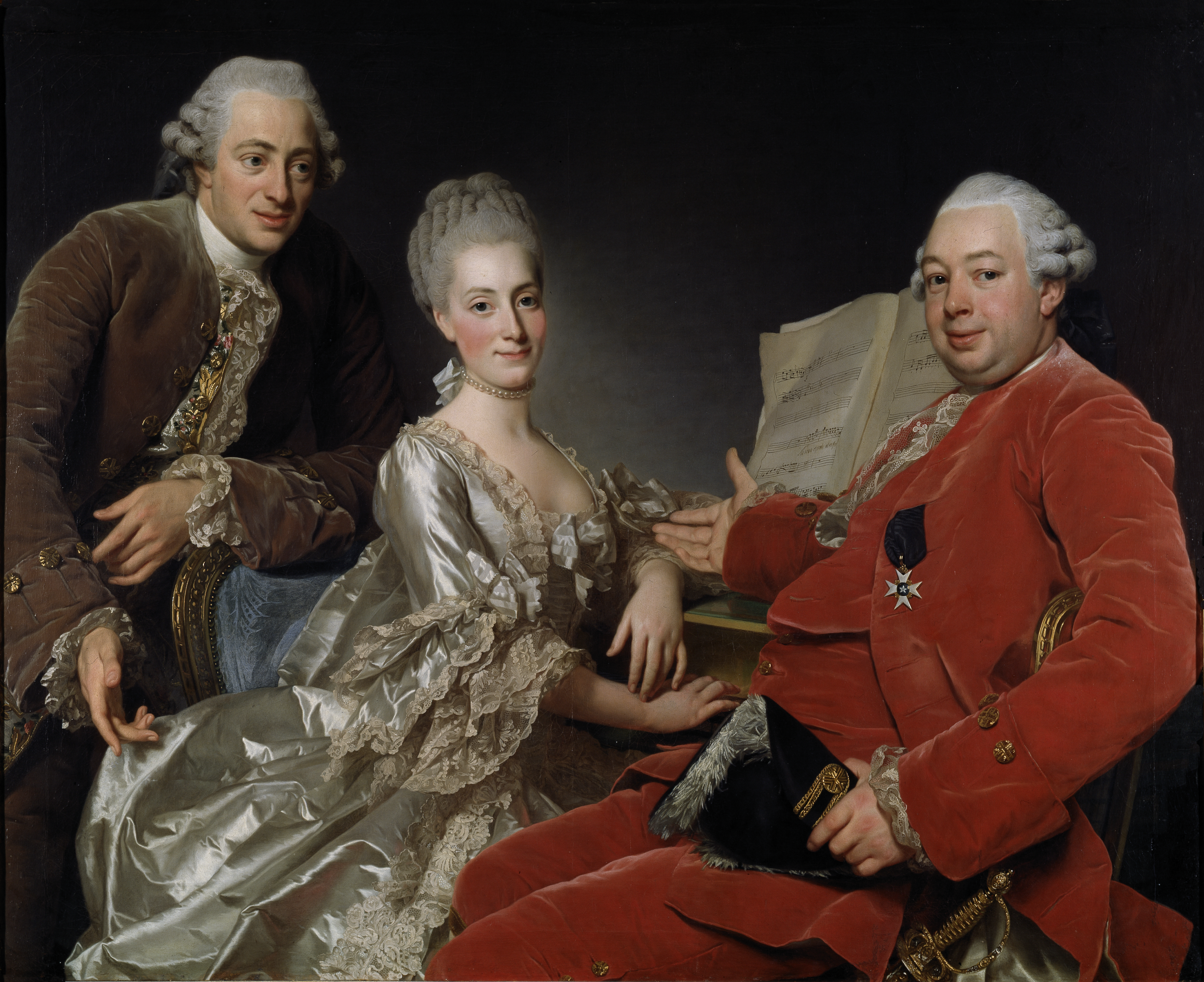
- Artist: Alexander Roslin
- Year: 1769
- Type: Oil on canvas, portrait painting
- Dimensions: 121 cm × 148 cm (48 in × 58 in)
- Location: Nationalmuseum; Stockholm

John Jennings, His Brother and Sister-in-Law (Swedish: Brukspatron John Jennings, hans bror och svägerska) is a 1769 portrait painting by the Swedish artist Alexander Roslin. It depicts the Swedish merchant John Jennings, his brother Frans and sister-in-law Jeanne Élise Trembley posing by a harpsichord. The family sat for the artist while on a visit to France where Roslin was based at the end of a Grand Tour around Europe. The painting was exhibited at the Salon of 1769 at the Louvre in Paris, where it was praised by the art critic Denis Diderot. Today it is in the Nationalmuseum in Stockholm.

== Bibliography ==
- Cavalli-Björkman, Görel, Karlsson, Eva-Lena & Ekkart, Rudolf E.O. Face to Face: Portraits from Five Centuries. University of Michigan, 2002.
- Levey, Michael. Painting and Sculpture in France, 1700-1789. Yale University Press, 1993.
- Magnusson, Lars. An Economic History of Sweden. Taylor & Francis, 2000.
