= Septimius Severus and Caracalla =

Painting by Jean-Baptiste Greuze

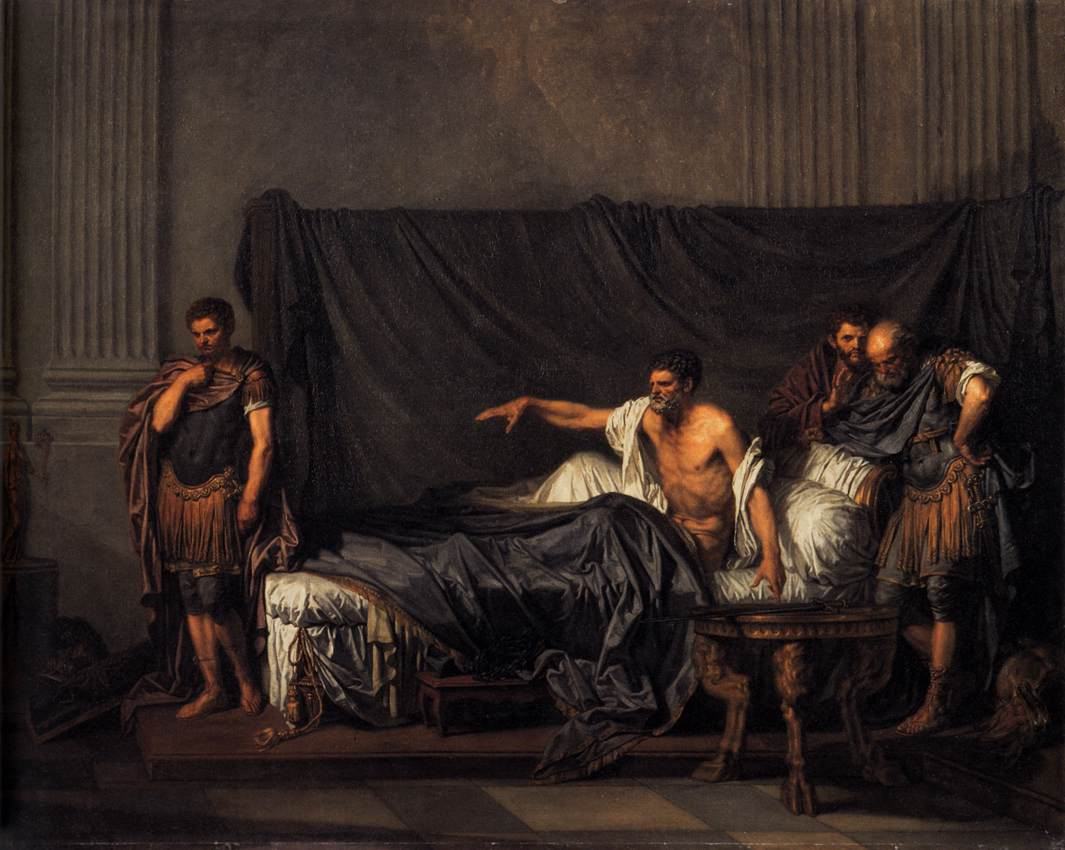
- Artist: Jean-Baptiste Greuze
- Year: 1769
- Type: Oil on canvas, history painting
- Dimensions: 124 cm × 160 cm (49 in × 63 in)
- Location: Louvre; Paris

Septimius Severus and Caracalla (French: Septime Sévère et Caracalla) is an oil on canvas history painting by the French artist Jean-Baptiste Greuze, from 1769. It is held in the Louvre, in Paris.

== History and description ==
It depicts a scene from the Roman Empire. On his deathbed in York, the Emperor Septimius Severus rebukes his son Caracalla for having conspired to have him assassinated while campaigning in Caledonia. Also present is the chamberlain Castor. It is also referred to as Septimius Severus Reproaching Caracalla.

Although best known for his genre scenes, this was Greuze's major attempt at history painting. It shows the influence of the emerging Neoclassical style. It was exhibited at the Salon of 1769 at the Louvre in Paris. Greuze presented it as his diploma work on his admission to Royal Academy. It is now in the collection of the Louvre.

== Bibliography ==
- Carlson, Victor I. (ed.)Visions of Antiquity: Neoclassical Figure Drawings. Los Angeles County Museum of Art, 1993.
- Levey, Michael. Painting and Sculpture in France, 1700-1789. Yale University Press, 1993.
