= Eleuterio Delgado =

Spanish lawyer and politician

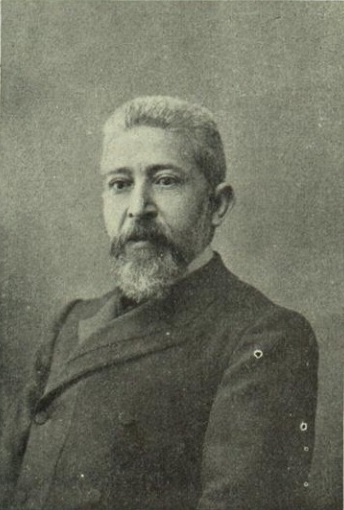
- Eleuterio Delgado, by Manuel Compañy.

Minister of Finance
- In office ← 30 Nov. 1906 – 4 Dec. 1906 →

Personal details
- Born: 18 April 1852; Sangarcía
- Died: 13 April 1908; Madrid

Eleuterio Delgado y Martín (18 April 1852 – 13 April 1908) was a Spanish lawyer and politician, briefly Minister of Finance during the reign of Alfonso XIII.

== Biography ==
Delgado was born on 18 April 1852 in Sangarcía, province of Segovia. After studying Law in Madrid, he obtained the post of state attorney (Abogado del Estado) in León, Bilbao and Ávila.

He was elected as member of the Spanish Congress (Cortes) in the 1901 election for the district of Viveiro, and re-elected there in the 1903 election; Then in 1905 he was elected for Riaza, and was elected for the third and last time for Viveiro in the 1907 election.

He served as Minister of Finance from 30 November to 4 December 1906 in the Segismundo Moret cabinet.

He died on 13 April 1908 in Madrid.

== Bibliography ==
- Urquijo y Goitia, José Ramón de (2008). Gobiernos y ministros españoles en la edad contemporánea (2ª ed.). Madrid: Consejo Superior de Investigaciones Científicas. ISBN 978-84-00-08737-1.
