= The Honest Model =

Painting by Pierre-Antoine Baudouin

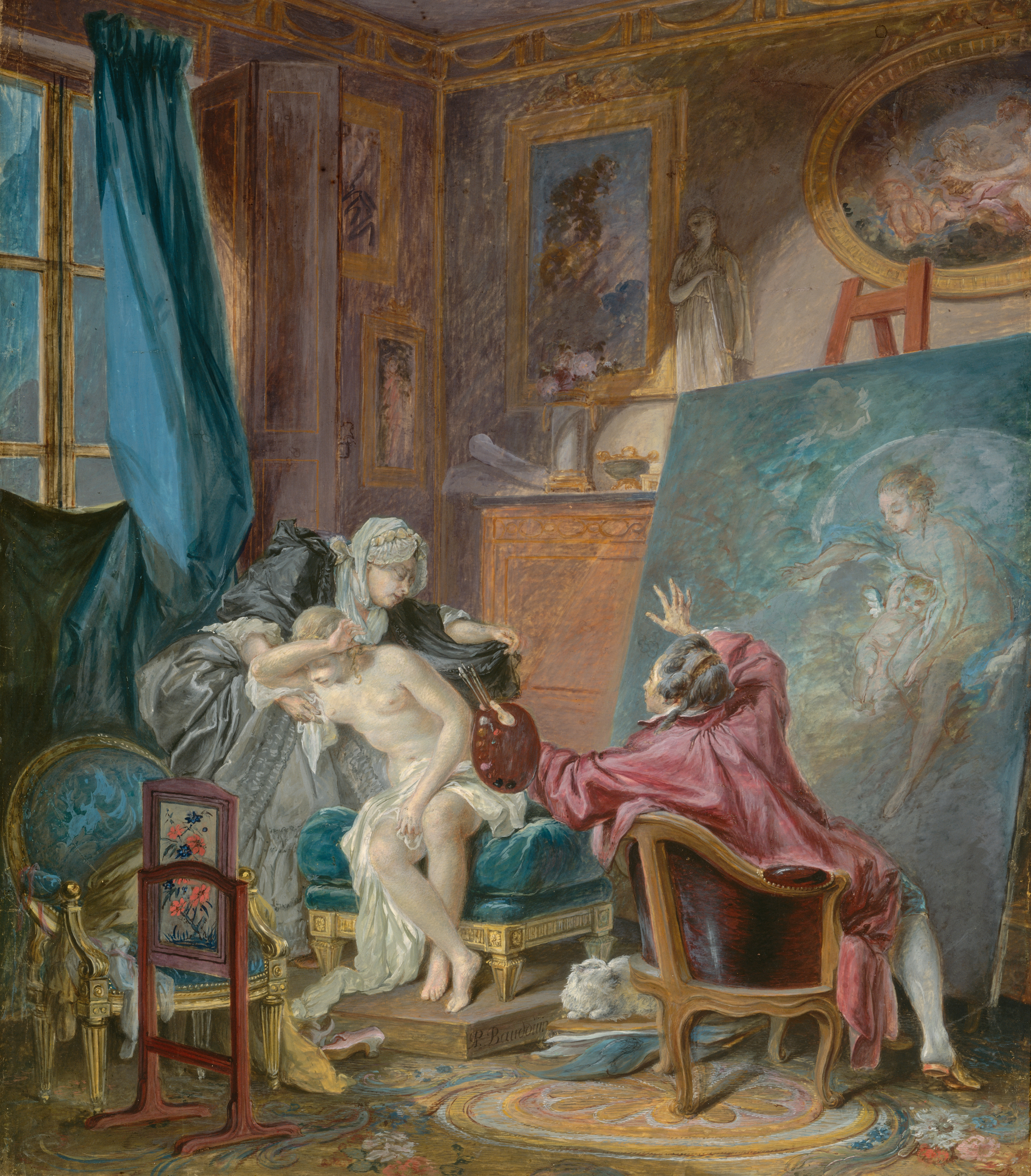
- Artist: Pierre-Antoine Baudouin
- Year: 1769
- Type: Gouache and graphite on vellum, genre painting
- Dimensions: 40.6 cm × 35.7 cm (16.0 in × 14.1 in)
- Location: National Gallery of Art, Washington D.C.

The Honest Model (Le Modèle honnête) is a 1769 genre painting by the French artist Pierre-Antoine Baudouin. It is held in the National Gallery of Art in Washington D.C., which was gifted it in 1983.

== History and description ==
It features a scene in an artist's studio where a nude model has been posing. A degree of uncertainty exists about exactly what it portrays particularly the identity of the older woman. It has been suggested that driven by poverty she has encouraged her daughter to pose for the painter or equally she has just burst in and discovered her daughter naked.

Baudouin was the pupil and son-in-law of the leading rococo painter François Boucher whose style he imitated. He primarily produced miniatures or larger works in gouache rather than oil. He had been elected to the Royal Academy in 1763. This painting was exhibited at the Salon of 1769 at the Louvre in Paris. He died later the same year at the age of forty six, with the rococo style he and Boucher soon falling out of fashion. It was widely discussed at the Salon, and provoked a degree of controversy. The art critic Baron von Grimm suggested that Baudouin was "a libertine with his brush" as he was "in his morals".

== Bibliography ==
- Bailey, Colin B. The Age of Watteau, Chardin, and Fragonard: Masterpieces of French Genre Painting. Yale University Press, 2003.
- Conisbee, Philip. French Genre Painting in the Eighteenth Century. National Gallery of Art, 2007.
- Hunt, Lynn. Eroticism and the Body Politic. Johns Hopkins University Press, 1991.
