= Sangarcía =

- Municipality
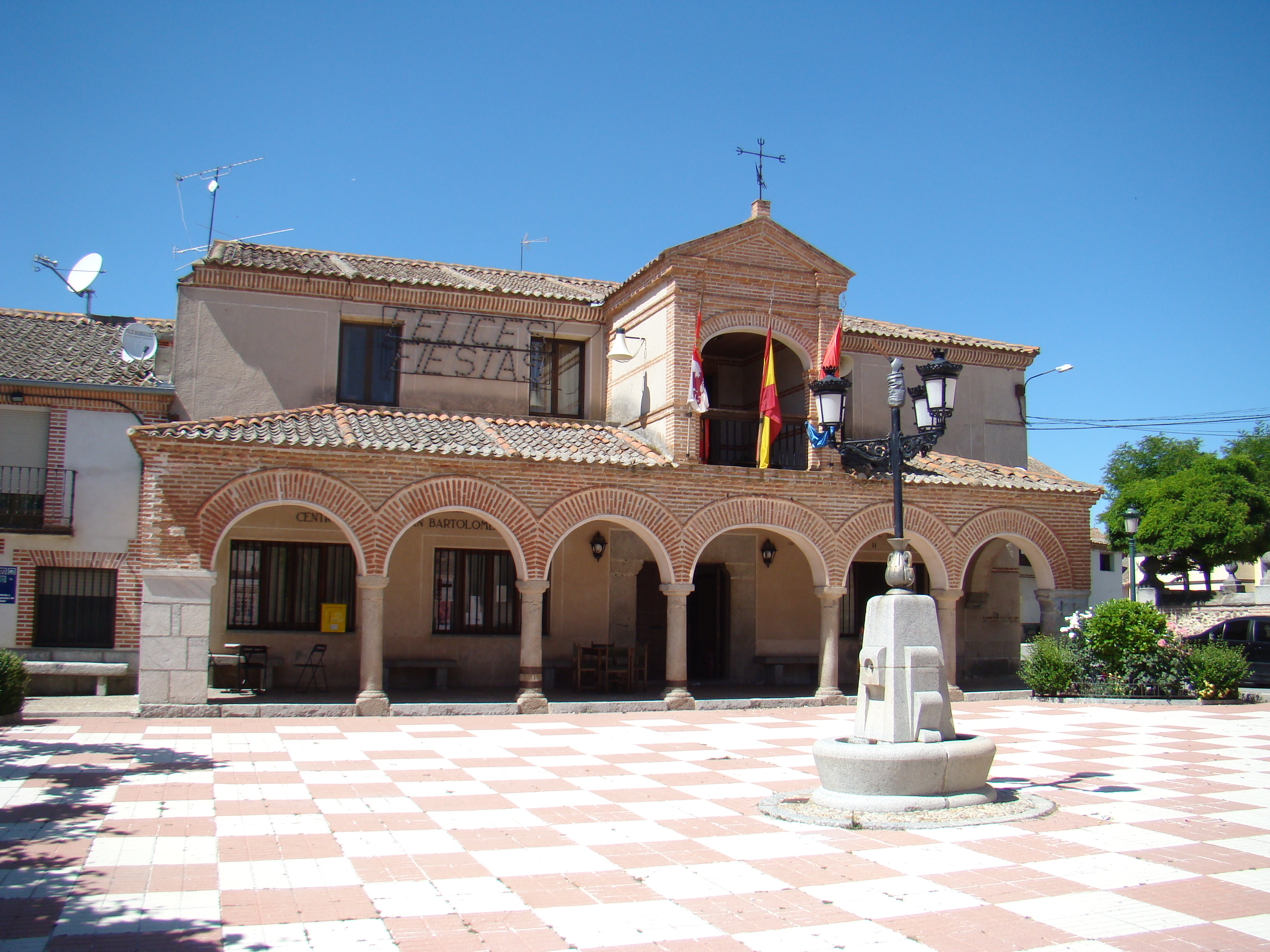

- Flag Coat of arms

- Location in Spain. Sangarcía (Spain)
- Coordinates: 40°56′50″N 4°24′51″W
- Country: Spain
- Autonomous community: Castile and León
- Province: Segovia
- Municipality: Sangarcía

Area
  - Total: 37 km^{2} (14 sq mi)

Population (2025-01-01)
  - Total: 281
  - Density: 7.6/km^{2} (20/sq mi)
- Time zone: UTC+1 (CET)
  - Summer (DST): UTC+2 (CEST)
- Website: Official website

Sangarcía is a municipality located in the province of Segovia, Castile and León, Spain. According to the 2004 census (INE), the municipality has a population of 450 inhabitants.

== Notable persons ==
- Eleuterio Delgado, lawyer and politician
