= Pierre-Antoine Baudouin =

French painter (1723–1769)

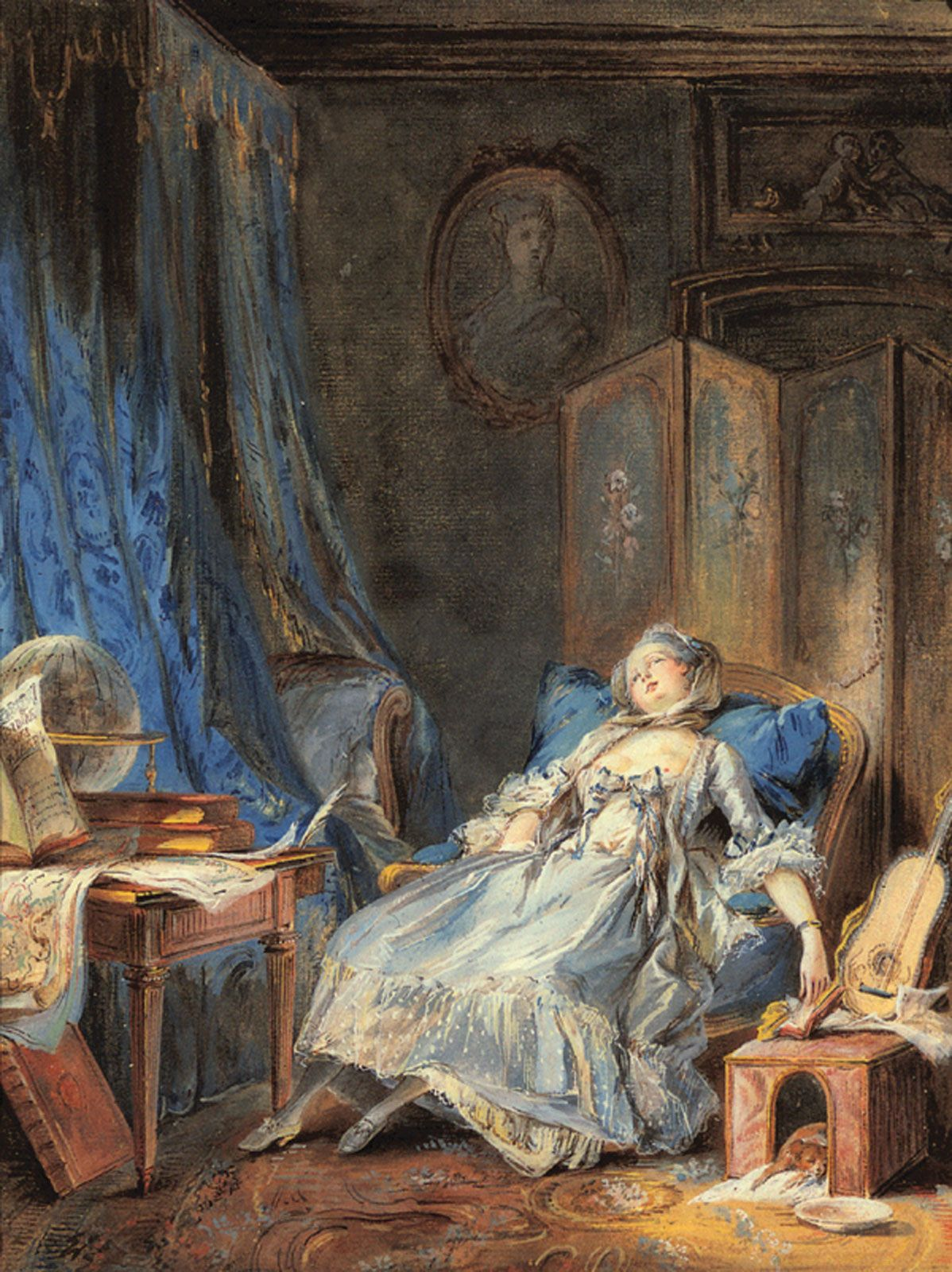
La Lecture, gouache from ca. 1760, now in the Musée des Arts Décoratifs, Paris.

Pierre-Antoine Baudouin (French pronunciation: [pjɛʁ ɑ̃twan bodwɛ̃]; 17 October 1723 – 15 December 1769) was a French painter. He worked in the same Rococo style of his father-in-law, François Boucher.

== Life ==
The son of Michel Baudouin (1692–1754), an engraver of little note, he was born in Paris in 1723. He was a pupil and imitator of Boucher, whose younger daughter he married in 1758, and through whose influence he was elected an Academician in 1763, as a miniature painter. He presented at the occasion his drawing of the Hyperides pleading the cause of Phryne before the Areopagus, now in the Louvre. Baudouin executed idyllic and erotic subjects in water-colours and crayons, but rarely painted in oil. He died in Paris in 1769.

== Gallery ==
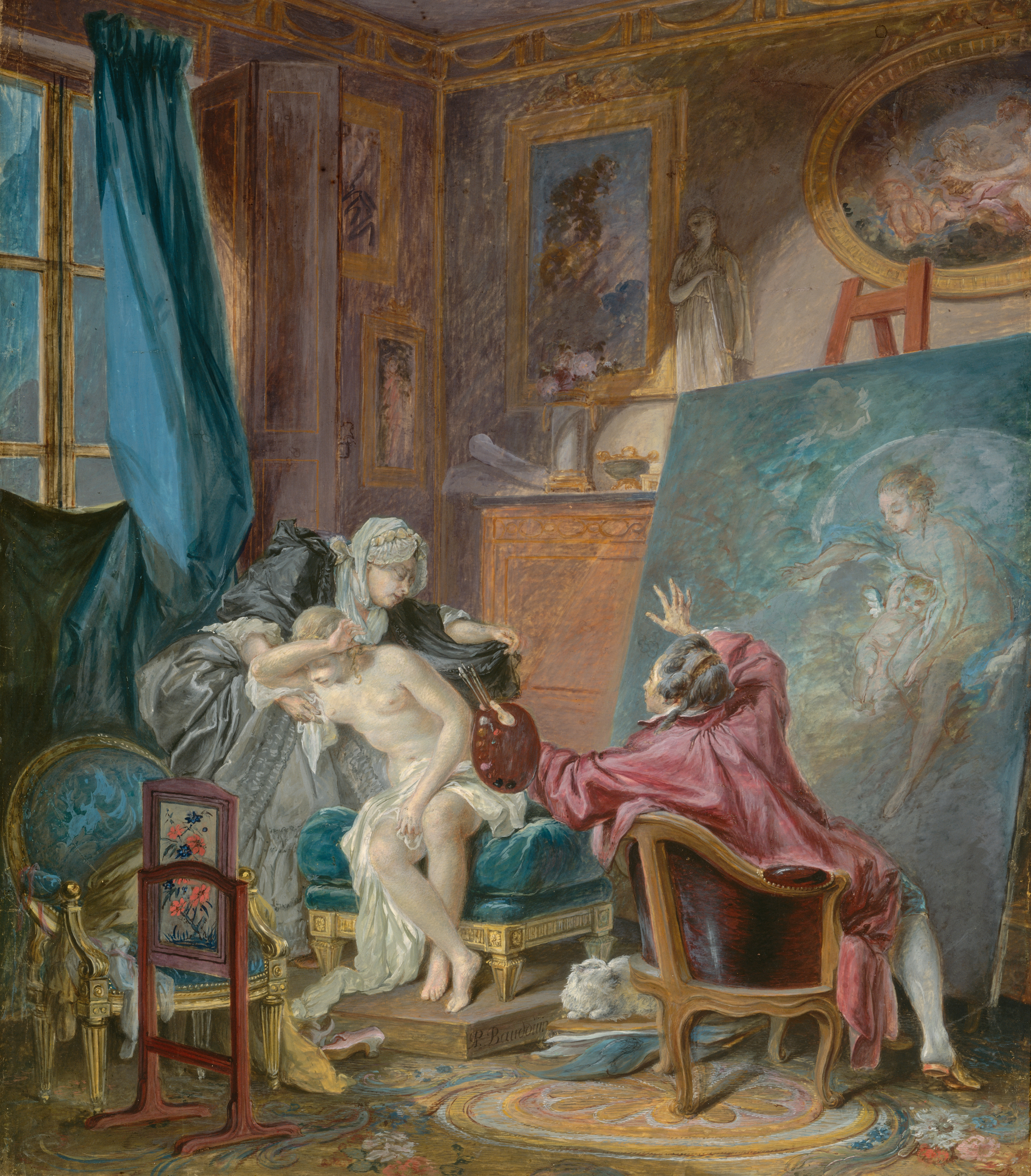
The Honest Model, 1769
