= List of foreign ministers of Spain =

This section lists the figures within the Spanish government responsible for the country's foreign policy from 1705 to the present.

The position was originally titled 'Secretary of State and of the Office of State' (Spanish: Secretario de Estado y del Despacho de Estado), although it was generally known as Secretary of State or First Secretary of State. Later, it was renamed as Minister of State, and, most recently, Minister of Foreign Affairs. Since 2018, the complete title have been Minister of Foreign Affairs, European Union, and Cooperation.

== List of ministers ==
Name	Start	End	Duration	Party	Government		Ref.
The Marquess of Mejorada del Campo (1656–1721)	11 July 1705	30 November 1714	9 years, 142 days	Non-partisan	The Marquess of Mejorada del Campo	Philip V (1700–1724)	
The Marquess of Grimaldo (1664–1733)	30 November 1714	10 January 1724	9 years, 41 days	Non-partisan	The Marquess of Grimaldo (Note: In practice, the "strong man" at court until 1719 was the ambassador of Parma, Giulio Alberoni.)	Philip V (1700–1724)	
The Marquess of the Peace (1683–1734)	10 January 1724	4 September 1724	238 days	Non-partisan	The Marquess of the Peace	Louis I (1724)	
The Marquess of Grimaldo (1664–1733)	4 September 1724	1 October 1726	2 years, 27 days	Non-partisan	José de Grimaldo (Note: Between 1725 and 1726, the "strong man" at court was The Baron Ripperda, who held the position of Secretary of State and of the Office without portfolio, as a favorite.)	Philip V (1724–1746)	
The Marquess of the Peace (1683–1734)	1 October 1726	21 October 1734†	8 years, 20 days	Non-partisan	The Marquess of the Peace	Philip V (1724–1746)	
José Patiño (1670–1736)	21 October 1734	3 November 1736†	2 years, 13 days	Non-partisan	José Patiño	Philip V (1724–1746)	
The Marquess of Villarías (1687–1766)	4 November 1736	4 December 1746	10 years, 30 days	Non-partisan	The Marquess of Villarías (Note: In practice, the "strong man" at court since 1743 was The Marquess of Ensenada, secretary of finance.)	Philip V (1724–1746)	
José de Carvajal y Lancáster (1687–1766)	4 December 1746	9 April 1754	7 years, 126 days	Non-partisan	José de Carvajal y Lancáster	Philip V (1724–1746)	
José de Carvajal y Lancáster (1687–1766)	4 December 1746	9 April 1754	7 years, 126 days	Non-partisan	José de Carvajal y Lancáster	Ferdinand VI (1746–1759)	
The Duke of Alba (1714–1776) acting minister	9 April 1754	15 May 1754	36 days	Non-partisan	The Duke of Alba	Ferdinand VI (1746–1759)	
Ricardo Wall (1694–1777)	15 May 1754	10 August 1759	9 years, 147 days	Non-partisan	Ricardo Wall	Ferdinand VI (1746–1759)	
Ricardo Wall (1694–1777)	10 August 1759	9 October 1763	9 years, 147 days	Non-partisan	Ricardo Wall	Charles III (1759–1788)	
The Duke of Grimaldi (1710–1789)	9 October 1763	19 February 1777	13 years, 133 days	Non-partisan	The Duke of Grimaldi	Charles III (1759–1788)	
The Count of Floridablanca (1728–1808)	19 February 1777	14 December 1788	15 years, 9 days	Non-partisan	The Count of Floridablanca	Charles III (1759–1788)	
The Count of Floridablanca (1728–1808)	14 December 1788	28 February 1792	15 years, 9 days	Non-partisan	The Count of Floridablanca	Charles IV (1788–1808)	
The Count of Aranda (1719–1798) acting minister	28 February 1792	15 November 1792	261 days	Non-partisan	The Count of Aranda (Note: Although he worked with some independence, by this time Manuel Godoy already controlled the court.)	Charles IV (1788–1808)	
The Prince of the Peace (1767–1851)	15 November 1792	28 March 1798	5 years, 133 days	Non-partisan	The Prince of the Peace	Charles IV (1788–1808)	
Francisco de Saavedra (1746–1819)	28 March 1798	21 February 1799	330 days	Non-partisan	Francisco de Saavedra (Note: He did not have an effective government. It was heavily influenced by his predecessor, and his ongoing health problems prevented him from exercise the office.)	Charles IV (1788–1808)	
Mariano Luis de Urquijo (1769–1817) acting minister	21 February 1799	13 December 1800	1 year, 295 days	Non-partisan	Mariano Luis de Urquijo	Charles IV (1788–1808)	
Pedro Cevallos (1759–1838)	13 December 1800	19 March 1808	7 years, 145 days	Non-partisan	Pedro Cevallos (Note: In practice, the government was run by Manuel Godoy.)	Charles IV (1788–1808)	
Pedro Cevallos (1759–1838)	19 March 1808	6 May 1808	7 years, 145 days	Non-partisan	Pedro Cevallos	Ferdinand VII (1808–1833)	
Reign of Joseph Bonaparte
Pedro Cevallos (1759–1838)	7 July 1808	11 August 1808	35 days	Non-partisan	Mariano Luis de Urquijo	Joseph Bonaparte (1808–1813)	
Manuel Negrete de la Torre (1736–1818)	11 August 1808	15 June 1811	2 years, 308 days	Non-partisan	Mariano Luis de Urquijo	Joseph Bonaparte (1808–1813)	
Miguel José de Azanza (1746–1826)	15 June 1811	11 December 1813	2 years, 179 days	Non-partisan	Mariano Luis de Urquijo	Joseph Bonaparte (1808–1813)	
Supreme Central Junta — Regency in the name of Ferdinand VII; Abdication of Ferdinand VII declared null and void by the Council of Castile on August 11, 1808 and recognition of him as king on August 24 of the same year.
Pedro Cevallos (1759–1838)	15 October 1808	5 January 1809	82 days	Non-partisan	Pedro Cevallos	Ferdinand VII (1808–1833)	
Martín de Garay (1771–1822) acting minister	5 January 1809	13 October 1809	281 days	Non-partisan	Martín de Garay	Ferdinand VII (1808–1833)	
Pedro de Rivero acting minister	13 October 1809	30 October 1809	17 days	Non-partisan	Pedro de Rivero	Ferdinand VII (1808–1833)	
Francisco de Saavedra (1746–1819)	30 October 1809	31 January 1810	93 days	Non-partisan	Francisco de Saavedra	Ferdinand VII (1808–1833)	
Nicolás Ambrosio Garro y Arizcun; Marquess consort of Hormazas (1747–1825) acting minister	31 January 1810	20 March 1810	48 days	Non-partisan	Nicolás Ambrosio Garro y Arizcun	Ferdinand VII (1808–1833)	
Eusebio Bardají y Azara (1776–1842)	20 March 1810	6 February 1812	1 year, 323 days	Non-partisan	Eusebio Bardají y Azara	Ferdinand VII (1808–1833)	
José García de León y Pizarro (1770–1835) acting minister	6 February 1812	12 May 1812	96 days	Non-partisan	José García de León y Pizarro	Ferdinand VII (1808–1833)	
Ignacio de la Pezuela (1764–1850) acting minister	12 May 1812	23 June 1812	42 days	Non-partisan	Ignacio de la Pezuela	Ferdinand VII (1808–1833)	
The Marquess of Casa Irujo (1765–1824)	23 June 1812	27 September 1812	96 days	Non-partisan	The Marquess of Casa Irujo	Ferdinand VII (1808–1833)	
The Marquess of Casa Irujo (1765–1824)	Ignacio de la Pezuela was acting minister due to the absence of the officeholder			Non-partisan	The Marquess of Casa Irujo	Ferdinand VII (1808–1833)	
The Marquess of Labrador (1764–1850)	27 September 1812	11 July 1813	287 days	Non-partisan	The Marquess of Labrador	Ferdinand VII (1808–1833)	
Antonio Cano Ramírez de Arellano (1768–1836) acting minister	11 July 1813	10 October 1813	91 days	Non-partisan	Antonio Cano Ramírez de Arellano	Ferdinand VII (1808–1833)	
Juan O'Donojú (1762–1821) acting minister	10 October 1813	6 December 1813	57 days	Non-partisan	Juan O'Donojú	Ferdinand VII (1808–1833)	
José Luyando (1773–1835) acting minister	6 December 1813	4 May 1814	149 days	Non-partisan	José Luyando	Ferdinand VII (1808–1833)	
Abolition of the Constitution of 1812
The Duke of San Carlos (1771–1828)	4 May 1814	15 November 1814	195 days	Non-partisan	The Duke of San Carlos	Ferdinand VII (1808–1833)	
Pedro Cevallos (1759–1838)	15 November 1814	30 October 1816	1 year, 350 days	Non-partisan	Pedro Cevallos	Ferdinand VII (1808–1833)	
José García de León y Pizarro (1770–1835)	30 October 1816	14 September 1818	1 year, 319 days	Non-partisan	José García de León y Pizarro	Ferdinand VII (1808–1833)	
The Marquess of Casa Irujo (1765–1824) acting minister	14 September 1818	12 June 1819	271 days	Non-partisan	The Marquess of Casa Irujo	Ferdinand VII (1808–1833)	
Manuel González Salmón (1778–1832)	12 June 1819	12 September 1819	92 days	Non-partisan	Manuel González Salmón	Ferdinand VII (1808–1833)	
The Duke of San Fernando de Quiroga (1780–1835)	12 September 1819	18 March 1820	188 days	Non-partisan	The Duke of San Fernando de Quiroga	Ferdinand VII (1808–1833)	
Start of the Trienio Liberal
Evaristo Pérez de Castro (1769–1849)	18 March 1820	2 March 1821	349 days	Non-partisan	Evaristo Pérez de Castro	Ferdinand VII (1808–1833)	
Eusebio Bardají y Azara (1776–1842)	4 March 1821	8 January 1822	310 days	Non-partisan	Eusebio Bardají Azara	Ferdinand VII (1808–1833)	
Eusebio Bardají y Azara (1776–1842)	Acting minsiters until the arrival of the minister: Joaquín Anduaga Cuenca (March 4, 1821–March 23, 1821); Francisco de Paula Escudero (March 23, 1821–December 8, 1821)			Non-partisan	Eusebio Bardají Azara	Ferdinand VII (1808–1833)	
Ramón López-Pelegrín (1767–1841) acting minister	8 January 1822	24 January 1822	16 days	Non-partisan	Ramón López-Pelegrín	Ferdinand VII (1808–1833)	
The Marquess of Santa Cruz (1782–1839)	24 January 1822	30 January 1822	6 days	Non-partisan	Marquess of Santa Cruz	Ferdinand VII (1808–1833)	
Ramón López-Pelegrín (1767–1841) acting minister	30 January 1822	28 February 1822	29 days	Non-partisan	Ramón López-Pelegrín	Ferdinand VII (1808–1833)	
Francisco Martínez de la Rosa (1787–1862)	28 February 1822	5 August 1822	158 days	Non-partisan	Francisco Martínez de la Rosa	Ferdinand VII (1808–1833)	
The Duke of San Miguel (1785–1862)	5 August 1822	24 April 1823	262 days	Non-partisan	The Duke of San Miguel	Ferdinand VII (1808–1833)	
José Manuel de Vadillo (1777–1858) acting minister	25 April 1823	7 May 1823	12 days	Non-partisan	José Manuel de Vadillo	Ferdinand VII (1808–1833)	
José María Pando (1787–1840)	13 May 1823	27 May 1823	4 days	Non-partisan	José María Pando	Ferdinand VII (1808–1833)	
The Marquess of La Constancia (1786–1830) acting minister	27 May 1823	7 August 1823	72 days	Non-partisan	The Marquess of La Constancia	Ferdinand VII (1808–1833)	
End of the Trienio Liberal
Víctor Damián Sáez (1776–1839)	7 August 1823	2 December 1823	117 days	Non-partisan	Víctor Damián Sáez	Ferdinand VII (1808–1833)	
Víctor Damián Sáez (1776–1839)	Luis María Salazar y Salazar was acting minister due to the absence of the officeholder (August 19, 1823-October 1, 1823).			Non-partisan	Víctor Damián Sáez	Ferdinand VII (1808–1833)	
The Marquess of Casa Irujo (1765–1824)	2 December 1823	17 January 1824†	46 days	Non-partisan	The Marquess of Casa Irujo	Ferdinand VII (1808–1833)	
The Marquess of Heredia (1775–1843)	18 January 1824	11 July 1824	175 days	Non-partisan	The Marquess of Heredia	Ferdinand VII (1808–1833)	
Francisco Cea Bermúdez (1779–1850)	11 July 1824	24 October 1825	1 year, 105 days	Non-partisan	Francisco Cea Bermúdez	Ferdinand VII (1808–1833)	
The Duke of the Infantado (1768–1841)	24 October 1825	19 August 1826	299 days	Non-partisan	The Duke of the Infantado	Ferdinand VII (1808–1833)	
Manuel González Salmón (1778–1832)	19 August 1826	18 January 1832†	5 years, 152 days	Non-partisan	Manuel González Salmón	Ferdinand VII (1808–1833)	
The Count of Alcudia (1777–1842) acting minister	20 January 1832	1 October 1832	257 days	Non-partisan	The Count of Alcudia	Ferdinand VII (1808–1833)	
The Count of Alcudia (1777–1842) acting minister	Francisco Tadeo Calomarde interino hasta la llegada del titular (20 January 1832-22 February 1832)			Non-partisan	The Count of Alcudia	Ferdinand VII (1808–1833)	
Francisco Cea Bermúdez (1779–1850)	1 October 1832	15 January 1834	1 year, 106 days	Non-partisan	Francisco Cea Bermúdez	Ferdinand VII (1808–1833)	
Francisco Cea Bermúdez (1779–1850)	José Cafranga Costilla was acting minister due to the absence of the officeholder (October 1, 1832-November 29, 1832)			Non-partisan	Francisco Cea Bermúdez	Isabella II (1833–1868)	
Francisco Martínez de la Rosa (1787–1862)	15 January 1834	7 June 1835	1 year, 143 days	Moderate	Francisco Martínez de la Rosa	Isabella II (1833–1868)	
The Count of Toreno (1786–1843)	7 June 1835	14 September 1835	99 days	Moderate	The Count of Toreno	Isabella II (1833–1868)	
Miguel Ricardo de Álava (Note: Acting during the absences of the Minister: Julián Villalba (14–17 September 1835) and Juan Álvarez Mendizábal (17–25 September).) (1772–1843)	14 September 1835	25 September 1835	11 days	Progressive	Miguel Ricardo de Álava	Isabella II (1833–1868)	
Juan Álvarez Mendizábal (1790–1853)	25 September 1835	27 April 1836	215 days	Progressive	Juan Álvarez Mendizábal (acting)	Isabella II (1833–1868)	
The Count of Almodovar (1777–1846)	27 April 1836	15 May 1836	18 days	Progressive	Juan Álvarez Mendizábal (acting)	Isabella II (1833–1868)	
Francisco Javier de Istúriz (1790–1871)	15 May 1836	14 August 1836	91 days	Moderate	Francisco Javier de Istúriz	Isabella II (1833–1868)	
José María Calatrava (Note: Acting during illness of the Minister: The Count of Almodóvar (10 March – 3 April 1837).) (1781–1846)	14 August 1836	18 August 1837	1 year, 4 days	Progressive	José María Calatrava	Isabella II (1833–1868)	
Eusebio Bardají y Azara (1776–1842)	18 August 1837	16 December 1837	120 days	Progressive	The Prince of Vergara	Isabella II (1833–1868)	
Eusebio Bardají y Azara (1776–1842)	18 August 1837	16 December 1837	120 days	Progressive	Eusebio Bardají Azara	Isabella II (1833–1868)	
The Marquess of Heredia (1775–1843)	16 December 1837	6 September 1838	264 days	Moderate	The Marquess of Heredia	Isabella II (1833–1868)	
The Duke of Frías (1783–1851)	6 September 1838	9 December 1838	94 days	Moderate	The Duke of Frías	Isabella II (1833–1868)	
Evaristo Pérez de Castro (Note: Acting until the arrival of the Minister: Mauricio Carlos de Onís y Mercklein (9 December 1838).) (1769–1849)	9 December 1838	19 July 1840	1 year, 223 days	Moderate	Evaristo Pérez de Castro	Isabella II (1833–1868)	
José del Castillo y Ayensa (1795–1861)	19 July 1840	20 July 1840	1 day	Moderate	Evaristo Pérez de Castro	Isabella II (1833–1868)	
Mauricio Carlos de Onís y Mercklein (1790–1861)	20 July 1840	29 August 1840	40 days	Progressive	The Marquess of Valdeterrazo	Isabella II (1833–1868)	
Mauricio Carlos de Onís y Mercklein (1790–1861)	20 July 1840	29 August 1840	40 days	Progressive	Valentín Ferraz y Barrau	Isabella II (1833–1868)	
Juan Antoine y Zayas (1805–1876)	29 August 1840	11 September 1840	13 days	Progressive	Modesto Cortázar y Leal de Ibarra	Isabella II (1833–1868)	
Vicente Sancho y Cobertores (1784–1860)	11 September 1840	16 September 1840	5 days	Progressive	Vicente Sancho y Cobertores	Isabella II (1833–1868)	
Joaquín María Ferrer y Cafraga (1777–1861)	16 September 1840	20 May 1841	246 days	Progressive	The Prince of Vergara	Isabella II (1833–1868)	
Joaquín María Ferrer y Cafraga (1777–1861)	16 September 1840	20 May 1841	246 days	Progressive	Joaquín María Ferrer	Isabella II (1833–1868)	
The Marquess of Valdeterrazo (1792–1876)	20 May 1841	17 June 1842	1 year, 28 days	Progressive	The Marquess of Valdeterrazo	Isabella II (1833–1868)	
The Count of Almodovar (1777–1846)	17 June 1842	9 May 1843	326 days	Progressive	The Marquess of Rodil	Isabella II (1833–1868)	
Manuel María de Aguilar (Note: Acting during the absence of the Minister: Joaquín de Frías y Moya (10–19 May 1843).) (1783–1867)	9 May 1843	19 May 1843	10 days	Progressive	Joaquín María López	Isabella II (1833–1868)	
Olegario de los Cuetos (1795–1844)	19 May 1843	23 July 1843	65 days	Progressive	Álvaro Gómez Becerra	Isabella II (1833–1868)	
Joaquín de Frías y Moya (1784–1851)	25 July 1843	20 November 1843	118 days	Progressive	Joaquín María López	Isabella II (1833–1868)	
Salustiano de Olózaga y Almandoz (1805–1873)	20 November 1843	29 November 1843	9 days	Progressive	Salustiano de Olózaga y Almandoz	Isabella II (1833–1868)	
Luis González Bravo (1811–1871)	29 November 1843	3 May 1844	156 days	Moderate	Luis González Bravo	Isabella II (1833–1868)	
The Marquess of Viluma (Note: Acting until the arrival of the Minister: Alejandro Mon y Menéndez (3 May – 6 June 1844).) (1797–1872)	3 May 1844	1 July 1844	59 days	Moderate	The Duke of Valencia	Isabella II (1833–1868)	
The Duke of Valencia (1799–1868)	1 July 1844	21 August 1844	51 days	Moderate	The Duke of Valencia	Isabella II (1833–1868)	
Francisco Martínez de la Rosa (Note: Acting until the arrival of the Minister: Ramón María Narváez y Campos (21 August – 16 September 1844).) (1787–1862)	21 August 1844	12 February 1846	1 year, 175 days	Moderate	The Duke of Valencia	Isabella II (1833–1868)	
The Marquess of Miraflores (1792–1872)	12 February 1846	16 March 1846	32 days	Moderate	The Marquess of Miraflores	Isabella II (1833–1868)	
The Duke of Valencia (1799–1868) acting minister	16 March 1846	5 April 1846	20 days	Moderate	The Duke of Valencia	Isabella II (1833–1868)	
Francisco Javier de Istúriz (1790–1871)	5 April 1846	28 January 1847	298 days	Moderate	Francisco Javier de Istúriz	Isabella II (1833–1868)	
The Marquess of Casa Irujo (1802–1855)	28 January 1847	28 March 1847	59 days	Moderate	The Marquess of Casa Irujo	Isabella II (1833–1868)	
Joaquín Francisco Pacheco (1808–1865)	28 March 1847	31 August 1847	156 days	Moderate	Joaquín Francisco Pacheco	Isabella II (1833–1868)	
Antonio Caballero (1816–1876) acting minister	31 August 1847	12 September 1847	12 days	Moderate	Florencio García Goyena	Isabella II (1833–1868)	
Modesto Cortázar (1783–1862)	12 September 1847	4 October 1847	22 days	Moderate	Florencio García Goyena	Isabella II (1833–1868)	
The Duke of Valencia (1799–1868)	4 October 1847	23 October 1847	19 days	Moderate	The Duke of Valencia	Isabella II (1833–1868)	
The Marquess of Casa Irujo (1802–1855)	23 October 1847	29 July 1848	280 days	Moderate	The Duke of Valencia	Isabella II (1833–1868)	
The Marquess of Pidal (1799–1865)	29 July 1848	19 October 1849	1 year, 82 days	Moderate	The Duke of Valencia	Isabella II (1833–1868)	
Salvador Cea Bermúdez (Note: Acting until the arrival of the Minister: José María Manresa y Navarro (19 October 1848).) (1803–1852)	19 October 1849	20 October 1849	1 day	Moderate	The Count of Clonard	Isabella II (1833–1868)	
The Marquess of Pidal (1799–1865)	20 October 1849	14 January 1851	1 year, 86 days	Moderate	The Duke of Valencia	Isabella II (1833–1868)	
Manuel Bertrán de Lis y Ribes (1806–1869)	14 January 1851	23 May 1851 (Note: Since 5 May 1851 he acted in acting capacity.)	129 days	Moderate	Juan Bravo Murillo	Isabella II (1833–1868)	
The Marquess of Miraflores (1792–1872)	23 May 1851	7 August 1852	1 year, 76 days	Moderate	Juan Bravo Murillo	Isabella II (1833–1868)	
Manuel Bertrán de Lis y Ribes (1806–1869)	7 August 1852	14 December 1852	129 days	Moderate	Juan Bravo Murillo	Isabella II (1833–1868)	
The Count of Alcoy (1800–1857)	14 December 1852	14 April 1853	121 days	Moderate	The Count of Alcoy	Isabella II (1833–1868)	
Luis López de la Torre Ayllón y Kirsmacker (Note: Acting until the arrival of the Minister: Francisco de Lersundi y Hormaechea (14 April 1853).) (1799–1876)	14 April 1853	21 June 1853	68 days	Moderate	Francisco Lersundi Hormaechea	Isabella II (1833–1868)	
Ángel Calderón de la Barca y Belgrano (Note: Acting until the arrival of the Minister: Francisco de Lersundi y Hormaechea (21 June 1853).) (1790–1861)	21 June 1853	17 July 1854	1 year, 26 days	Moderate	Francisco Lersundi Hormaechea	Isabella II (1833–1868)	
Ángel Calderón de la Barca y Belgrano (1790–1861)	21 June 1853	17 July 1854	1 year, 26 days	Moderate	The Count of San Luis	Isabella II (1833–1868)	
Luis Mayans (1805–1880)	18 July 1854	30 July 1854	12 days	Moderate	The Duke of Rivas	Isabella II (1833–1868)	
Luis Mayans (1805–1880)	18 July 1854	30 July 1854	12 days	Moderate	The Prince of Vergara	Isabella II (1833–1868)	
Joaquín Francisco Pacheco (1808–1865)	30 July 1854	28 November 1854	121 days	Progressive	The Prince of Vergara	Isabella II (1833–1868)	
Claudio Antón de Luzuriaga (1792–1874)	28 November 1854	11 June 1855	195 days	Progressive	The Prince of Vergara	Isabella II (1833–1868)	
The Marquess of Sierra Bullones (Note: Acting until the absences of the Minister: The Count of Lucena (27 July – 2 August 1855; and 9 April – 16 May 1856).) (1804–1879)	11 June 1855	14 July 1856	1 year, 33 days	Progressive	The Prince of Vergara	Isabella II (1833–1868)	
Nicomedes Pastor Díaz (1811–1863)	14 July 1856	12 October 1856	90 days	Liberal Unionist	The Duke of Tetuán	Isabella II (1833–1868)	
The Marquess of Pidal (1799–1865)	12 October 1856	15 October 1857	1 year, 3 days	Moderate	The Duke of Valencia	Isabella II (1833–1868)	
The Marquess of Valmar (1815–1901)	15 October 1857	25 October 1857	10 days	Moderate	The Marquess of Nervión	Isabella II (1833–1868)	
Francisco Martínez de la Rosa (1787–1862)	25 October 1857	14 January 1858	81 days	Moderate	The Marquess of Nervión	Isabella II (1833–1868)	
Francisco Javier de Istúriz (1790–1871)	14 January 1858	30 June 1858	167 days	Moderate	Francisco Javier de Istúriz	Isabella II (1833–1868)	
The Duke of Tetuán (1809–1867) acting minister	30 June 1858	2 July 1858	2 days	Liberal Unionist	The Duke of Tetuán	Isabella II (1833–1868)	
Saturnino Calderón Collantes (Note: Acting during the absences and illnesses of the Minister: The Duke of Tetuan (4–31 August 1859; 5–30 August 1860; 20 October 1860 – 6 February 1861; and 3 August – 2 September 1862).) (1799–1864)	2 July 1858	17 January 1863	4 years, 199 days	Liberal Unionist	The Duke of Tetuán	Isabella II (1833–1868)	
The Duke of the Tower (1810–1885)	17 January 1863	2 March 1863	44 days	Liberal Unionist	The Duke of Tetuán	Isabella II (1833–1868)	
The Marquess of Miraflores (1792–1872)	2 March 1863	1 March 1864	365 days	Moderate	The Marquess of Miraflores	Isabella II (1833–1868)	
The Marquess of Miraflores (1792–1872)	2 March 1863	1 March 1864	365 days	Moderate	Lorenzo Arrazola	Isabella II (1833–1868)	
Joaquín Francisco Pacheco (Note: Acting during absence of the Minister: Alejandro Mon y Menéndez (30 April – 13 May 1864)) (1808–1865)	1 March 1864	16 September 1864	199 days	Moderate	Alejandro Mon y Menéndez	Isabella II (1833–1868)	
Alejandro Llorente (1814–1901)	16 September 1864	10 December 1864	85 days	Moderate	The Duke of Valencia	Isabella II (1833–1868)	
Antonio Benavides Fernández de Navarrete (Note: Acting during illness of the Minister: Lorenzo Arrazola y García (19 April – 3 May 1865) and Luis González-Bravo y López de Arjona (3–4 May 1865).) (1807–1884)	10 December 1864	8 June 1865	180 days	Moderate	The Duke of Valencia	Isabella II (1833–1868)	
Lorenzo Arrazola (1795–1873) acting minister	8 June 1865	21 June 1865	13 days	Moderate	The Duke of Valencia	Isabella II (1833–1868)	
Manuel Bermúdez de Castro y Díez (1811–1870)	21 June 1865	10 July 1866	1 year, 19 days	Liberal Unionist	The Duke of Tetuán	Isabella II (1833–1868)	
Lorenzo Arrazola (1795–1873) acting minister	10 July 1866	13 July 1866	3 days	Moderate	The Duke of Valencia	Isabella II (1833–1868)	
Eusebio Calonge (1813–1873)	13 July 1866	9 June 1867	331 days	Moderate	The Duke of Valencia	Isabella II (1833–1868)	
Alejandro de Castro y Casal (1812–1881)	9 June 1867	27 June 1867	18 days	Moderate	The Duke of Valencia	Isabella II (1833–1868)	
Lorenzo Arrazola (1795–1873)	27 June 1867	23 April 1868	301 days	Moderate	The Duke of Valencia	Isabella II (1833–1868)	
The Marquess of Roncali (1811–1875)	23 April 1868 (Note: Until June 15 he acted in acting capacity.)	30 September 1868	160 days	Moderate	Luis González Bravo	Isabella II (1833–1868)	
The Marquess of Roncali (1811–1875)	23 April 1868	30 September 1868	160 days	Moderate	The Marquess of Havana	Isabella II (1833–1868)	
The Viscount of Barrantes (1818–1883)	8 October 1868	18 June 1869	253 days	Liberal Unionist	The Duke of the Tower	The Duke of the Tower (regent) (1869–1871)	
Manuel Silvela y Le Vielleuze (Note: Acting during absence of the Minister: Manuel Becerra y Bermúdez (30 August – 21 September 1869).) (1830–1892)	18 June 1869	1 November 1869	136 days	Progressive	The Marquess of Castillejos	The Duke of the Tower (regent) (1869–1871)	
Cristino Martos y Balbí (1830–1893)	1 November 1869	9 January 1870	69 days	Progressive	The Marquess of Castillejos	The Duke of the Tower (regent) (1869–1871)	
Práxedes Mateo Sagasta (1825–1903)	9 January 1870	27 December 1870 (Note: Since December 25 he acted in acting capacity.)	352 days	Progressive	The Marquess of Castillejos	The Duke of the Tower (regent) (1869–1871)	
Juan Bautista Topete (1821–1885)	27 December 1870	4 January 1871	8 days	Progressive	Juan Bautista Topete	The Duke of the Tower (regent) (1869–1871)	
Cristino Martos y Balbí (1830–1893)	4 January 1871	24 July 1871	201 days	Radical-Democrat	The Duke of the Tower	Amadeo I (1871–1873)	
The Marquess of Mendigorría (1809–1883) acting minister	24 July 1871	5 October 1871	73 days	Radical-Democrat	Manuel Ruiz Zorrilla	Amadeo I (1871–1873)	
The Marquess of San Rafael (1828–1880)	5 October 1871	20 November 1871	46 days	Constitutionalist	The Marquess of San Rafael	Amadeo I (1871–1873)	
Bonifacio de Blas y Muñoz (1829–1878)	20 November 1871	26 May 1872	188 days	Constitutionalist	The Marquess of San Rafael	Amadeo I (1871–1873)	
Bonifacio de Blas y Muñoz (1829–1878)	20 November 1871	26 May 1872	188 days	Constitutionalist	Práxedes Mateo Sagasta	Amadeo I (1871–1873)	
Augusto Ulloa y Castañón (1823–1879)	26 May 1872	13 June 1872	18 days	Constitutionalist	The Duke of the Tower	Amadeo I (1871–1873)	
Cristino Martos y Balbí (Note: Acting during absence of the Minister: Manuel Merelo y Calvo (30 July – 1 September 1872).) (1830–1893)	13 June 1872	12 February 1873	244 days	Radical-Democrat	Manuel Ruiz Zorrilla	Amadeo I (1871–1873)	
Emilio Castelar (1832–1899)	12 February 1873	11 June 1873	119 days	Federal Republican	Estanislao Figueras	List of presidents of the First Republic	
José Muro (1842–1907)	11 June 1873	28 June 1873	17 days	Federal Republican	Francisco Pi y Margall	List of presidents of the First Republic	
Eleuterio Maisonnave (1840–1890)	28 June 1873	18 July 1873	20 days	Federal Republican	Francisco Pi y Margall	List of presidents of the First Republic	
Santiago Soler y Pla (1839–1888)	19 July 1873	4 September 1873	47 days	Federal Republican	Nicolás Salmerón	List of presidents of the First Republic	
José Carvajal y Hué (1835–1899)	8 September 1873	3 January 1874	117 days	Federal Republican	Emilio Castelar	List of presidents of the First Republic	
Práxedes Mateo Sagasta (1825–1903)	3 January 1874	13 May 1874	130 days	Constitutionalist	The Duke of the Tower	List of presidents of the First Republic	
Augusto Ulloa (1823–1879)	13 May 1874	31 December 1874	232 days	Constitutionalist	The Marquess of Sierra Bullones	List of presidents of the First Republic	
Augusto Ulloa (1823–1879)	13 May 1874	31 December 1874	232 days	Constitutionalist	Práxedes Mateo Sagasta	List of presidents of the First Republic	
Alejandro de Castro y Casal (Note: Acting until the arrival of the Minister: The Marquess of Molíns (31 December 1874 – 5 January 1875).) (1812–1881)	31 December 1874	12 September 1875	255 days	Conservative	Antonio Cánovas del Castillo	Alfonso XII (1874–1885)	
The Count of Casa Valencia (Note: Acting until the arrival of the Minister: Adelardo López de Ayala y Herrera (12–16 September 1875).) (Note: Acting during illness of the Minister: Fernando Calderón de la Barca y Collantes (4–29 November 1875).) (1831–1914)	12 September 1875	29 November 1875	78 days	Conservative	Joaquín Jovellar y Soler	Alfonso XII (1874–1885)	
The Marquess of Reinosa (1811–1890)	2 December 1875	14 January 1877	1 year, 43 days	Conservative	Antonio Cánovas del Castillo	Alfonso XII (1874–1885)	
Manuel Silvela y Le Vielleuze (Note: Acting during the absences of the Minister: Cristóbal Martín de Herrera (11 July – 13 August 1877) and The Count of Toreno (28 July – 3 September 1878).) (1830–1892)	14 January 1877	7 March 1879	2 years, 52 days	Conservative	Antonio Cánovas del Castillo	Alfonso XII (1874–1885)	
The Count of Toreno (1840–1890) acting minister	7 March 1879	15 March 1879	8 days	Conservative	Arsenio Martínez Campos	Alfonso XII (1874–1885)	
The Marquess of Molins (1812–1889)	15 March 1879	16 May 1879	62 days	Conservative	Arsenio Martínez Campos	Alfonso XII (1874–1885)	
The Duke of Tetuán (1834–1903)	16 May 1879	9 December 1879	207 days	Conservative	Arsenio Martínez Campos	Alfonso XII (1874–1885)	
The Count of Toreno (1840–1890)	9 December 1879	20 January 1880	42 days	Conservative	Antonio Cánovas del Castillo	Alfonso XII (1874–1885)	
Antonio Cánovas del Castillo (1828–1897) acting minister	20 January 1880	19 March 1880	59 days	Conservative	Antonio Cánovas del Castillo	Alfonso XII (1874–1885)	
The Marquess of the Pazo de la Merced (Note: Acting during absence of the Minister: Antonio Cánovas del Castillo (25 October – 22 November 1880).) (1823–1898)	19 March 1880	8 February 1881	326 days	Conservative	Antonio Cánovas del Castillo	Alfonso XII (1874–1885)	
The Marquess of Vega de Armijo (1824–1908)	8 February 1881	13 October 1883	2 years, 247 days	Liberal	Práxedes Mateo Sagasta	Alfonso XII (1874–1885)	
Servando Ruiz-Gómez y González-Llanos (1821–1888)	13 October 1883	18 January 1884	97 days	Dynastic Left	José Posada Herrera	Alfonso XII (1874–1885)	
The Marquess of the Pazo de la Merced (1823–1898)	18 January 1884	27 November 1885	1 year, 313 days	Conservative	Antonio Cánovas del Castillo	Alfonso XII (1874–1885)	
Segismundo Moret (1833–1913)	27 November 1885	14 June 1888	2 years, 200 days	Liberal	Práxedes Mateo Sagasta	Alfonso XIII (1886–1931)	
The Marquess of Vega de Armijo (1824–1908)	14 June 1888	5 July 1890	2 years, 21 days	Liberal	Práxedes Mateo Sagasta	Alfonso XIII (1886–1931)	
The Duke of Tetuán (1834–1903)	5 July 1890	11 December 1892	2 years, 159 days	Conservative	Antonio Cánovas del Castillo	Alfonso XIII (1886–1931)	
The Marquess of Vega de Armijo (1824–1908)	11 December 1892	5 April 1893	115 days	Liberal	Práxedes Mateo Sagasta	Alfonso XIII (1886–1931)	
Segismundo Moret (Note: Acting until 12 March 1894.) (1833–1913)	5 April 1893	4 November 1894	1 year, 213 days	Liberal	Práxedes Mateo Sagasta	Alfonso XIII (1886–1931)	
Alejandro Groizard (1830–1919)	4 November 1894	23 March 1895	139 days	Liberal	Práxedes Mateo Sagasta	Alfonso XIII (1886–1931)	
The Duke of Tetuán (1834–1903)	23 March 1895	19 January 1896	302 days	Conservative	Antonio Cánovas del Castillo	Alfonso XIII (1886–1931)	
The Marquess of the Pazo de la Merced (1823–1898)	19 January 1896	5 March 1896	46 days	Conservative	Antonio Cánovas del Castillo	Alfonso XIII (1886–1931)	
The Duke of Tetuán (1834–1903)	5 March 1896	4 October 1897	1 year, 213 days	Conservative	Antonio Cánovas del Castillo	Alfonso XIII (1886–1931)	
The Duke of Tetuán (1834–1903)	5 March 1896	4 October 1897	1 year, 213 days	Conservative	Marcelo Azcárraga (Note: Acting prime minister after the assassination of Antonio Cánovas del Castillo.)	Alfonso XIII (1886–1931)	
Pío Gullón Iglesias (1835–1917)	4 October 1897	18 May 1898	226 days	Liberal	Práxedes Mateo Sagasta	Alfonso XIII (1886–1931)	
José Gutiérrez de Agüera acting minister	18 May 1898	24 May 1898	6 days	Liberal	Práxedes Mateo Sagasta	Alfonso XIII (1886–1931)	
The Duke of Almodóvar del Río (1850–1906)	24 May 1898	4 March 1899	284 days	Liberal	Práxedes Mateo Sagasta	Alfonso XIII (1886–1931)	
Francisco Silvela (1845–1905)	4 March 1899	18 April 1900	1 year, 45 days	Conservative	Francisco Silvela	Alfonso XIII (1886–1931)	
The Marquess of Aguilar de Campoo (1837–1914)	18 April 1900	6 March 1901	322 days	Conservative	Francisco Silvela	Alfonso XIII (1886–1931)	
The Marquess of Aguilar de Campoo (1837–1914)	18 April 1900	6 March 1901	322 days	Conservative	Marcelo Azcárraga	Alfonso XIII (1886–1931)	
The Duke of Almodóvar del Río (1850–1906)	6 March 1901	6 December 1902	1 year, 275 days	Liberal	Práxedes Mateo Sagasta	Alfonso XIII (1886–1931)	
Buenaventura de Abarzuza y Ferrer (1843–1910)	6 December 1902	20 July 1903	226 days	Conservative	Francisco Silvela	Alfonso XIII (1886–1931)	
The Count of San Bernardo (1842–1905)	20 July 1903	5 December 1903	138 days	Conservative	The Marquess of Pozo Rubio	Alfonso XIII (1886–1931)	
Faustino Rodríguez-San Pedro (Note: Acting during absence of the Minister: Antonio de Castro y Casaléiz (9–18 December 1903).) (1833–1925)	5 December 1903	16 December 1904	1 year, 11 days	Conservative	Antonio Maura	Alfonso XIII (1886–1931)	
The Marquess of Aguilar de Campoo (1837–1914)	16 December 1904	27 January 1905	42 days	Conservative	Marcelo Azcárraga	Alfonso XIII (1886–1931)	
The Marquess of Villa-Urrutia (Note: Acting during the absences of the Minister: Antonio de Castro y Casaléiz (13–24 February 1905) and Emilio de Ojeda y Perpiñán (27 March – 23 June 1905).) (1850–1933)	27 January 1905	23 June 1905	147 days	Conservative	The Marquess of Pozo Rubio	Alfonso XIII (1886–1931)	
Felipe Sánchez Román (1850–1916)	23 June 1905	31 October 1905	130 days	Liberal	Eugenio Montero Ríos	Alfonso XIII (1886–1931)	
Pío Gullón Iglesias (Note: Acting during absence of the Minister: Emilio de Ojeda y Perpiñán (2–11 November 1905).) (1835–1917)	31 October 1905	1 December 1905	31 days	Liberal	Eugenio Montero Ríos	Alfonso XIII (1886–1931)	
The Duke of Almodóvar del Río (Note: Acting during absence of the Minister: Emilio de Ojeda y Perpiñán (14 January – 9 February 1906).) (1850–1906)	1 December 1905	23 June 1906†	204 days	Liberal	Segismundo Moret	Alfonso XIII (1886–1931)	
Emilio de Ojeda y Perpiñán (1845–1911) acting minister	23 June 1906	30 June 1906	7 days	Liberal	Segismundo Moret	Alfonso XIII (1886–1931)	
Juan Pérez-Caballero y Ferrer (1861–1951)	30 June 1906	6 July 1906	6 days	Liberal	Segismundo Moret	Alfonso XIII (1886–1931)	
Pío Gullón Iglesias (1835–1917)	6 July 1906	30 November 1906	147 days	Liberal	José López Domínguez	Alfonso XIII (1886–1931)	
Juan Pérez-Caballero y Ferrer (1861–1951)	30 November 1906	25 January 1907	56 days	Liberal	Segismundo Moret	Alfonso XIII (1886–1931)	
Juan Pérez-Caballero y Ferrer (1861–1951)	30 November 1906	25 January 1907	56 days	Liberal	The Marquess of Vega de Armijo	Alfonso XIII (1886–1931)	
Manuel Allendesalazar y Muñoz (1856–1923)	25 January 1907	21 October 1909	2 years, 269 days	Conservative	Antonio Maura	Alfonso XIII (1886–1931)	
Juan Pérez-Caballero y Ferrer (Note: Acting during absence of the Minister: Ramón Piña y Millet (18–30 November 1909).) (1861–1951)	21 October 1909	9 February 1910	111 days	Liberal	Segismundo Moret	Alfonso XIII (1886–1931)	
The Marquess of Alhucemas (1859–1938)	9 February 1910	31 December 1912	2 years, 326 days	Liberal	José Canalejas y Méndez	Alfonso XIII (1886–1931)	
The Marquess of Alhucemas (1859–1938)	9 February 1910	31 December 1912	2 years, 326 days	Liberal	The Marquess of Alhucemas (Note: He acted as acting prime minister after the assassination of José Canalejas on 12 November 1912)	Alfonso XIII (1886–1931)	
The Marquess of Alhucemas (1859–1938)	9 February 1910	31 December 1912	2 years, 326 days	Liberal	The Count of Romanones	Alfonso XIII (1886–1931)	
Juan Navarro-Reverter (1844–1924)	31 December 1912	13 June 1913	164 days	Liberal	The Count of Romanones	Alfonso XIII (1886–1931)	
The Count of López Muñoz (1850–1929)	13 June 1913	27 October 1913	136 days	Liberal	The Count of Romanones	Alfonso XIII (1886–1931)	
The Duke of Ripalda (1863–1945)	27 October 1913	9 December 1915	2 years, 43 days	Conservative	Eduardo Dato	Alfonso XIII (1886–1931)	
Miguel Villanueva y Gómez (1852–1931)	9 December 1915	25 February 1916	78 days	Liberal	The Count of Romanones	Alfonso XIII (1886–1931)	
The Count of Romanones (1863–1950) acting minister	25 February 1916	30 April 1916	65 days	Liberal	The Count of Romanones	Alfonso XIII (1886–1931)	
The Count of Gimeno (1852–1936)	30 April 1916	19 April 1917	354 days	Liberal	The Count of Romanones	Alfonso XIII (1886–1931)	
Juan Alvarado y del Saz (1856–1935)	19 April 1917	11 June 1917	53 days	Liberal	The Marquess of Alhucemas	Alfonso XIII (1886–1931)	
The Duke of Ripalda (1863–1945)	11 June 1917	3 November 1917	145 days	Conservative	Eduardo Dato	Alfonso XIII (1886–1931)	
The Marquess of Alhucemas (1859–1938)	3 November 1917	22 March 1918	139 days	Liberal Democrat	The Marquess of Alhucemas	Alfonso XIII (1886–1931)	
Eduardo Dato (Note: Acting during illness of the Minister: The Marquess of Alhucemas (28–30 October 1918).) (1856–1921)	22 March 1918	9 November 1918	232 days	Conservative	Antonio Maura	Alfonso XIII (1886–1931)	
The Count of Romanones (Note: Acting during absence of the Minister: Juan Pérez-Caballero y Ferrer (18–24 December 1918).) (1863–1950)	9 November 1918	15 April 1919	157 days	Liberal	The Marquess of Alhucemas	Alfonso XIII (1886–1931)	
The Count of Romanones (1863–1950)	9 November 1918	15 April 1919	157 days	Liberal	The Count of Romanones	Alfonso XIII (1886–1931)	
Manuel González Hontoria (1878–1954)	15 April 1919	20 July 1919	96 days	Independent	Antonio Maura	Alfonso XIII (1886–1931)	
The Duke of Ripalda (1863–1945)	20 July 1919	14 August 1921	2 years, 25 days	Conservative	Joaquín Sánchez de Toca	Alfonso XIII (1886–1931)	
The Duke of Ripalda (1863–1945)	20 July 1919	14 August 1921	2 years, 25 days	Conservative	Manuel Allendesalazar	Alfonso XIII (1886–1931)	
The Duke of Ripalda (1863–1945)	20 July 1919	14 August 1921	2 years, 25 days	Conservative	Eduardo Dato	Alfonso XIII (1886–1931)	
The Duke of Ripalda (1863–1945)	20 July 1919	14 August 1921	2 years, 25 days	Conservative	The Count of Bugallal (Note: He acted acting prime minister after the assassination of Eduardo Dato from March 8 to March 13, 1921)	Alfonso XIII (1886–1931)	
The Duke of Ripalda (1863–1945)	20 July 1919	14 August 1921	2 years, 25 days	Conservative	Manuel Allendesalazar	Alfonso XIII (1886–1931)	
Manuel González Hontoria (1878–1954)	14 August 1921	8 March 1922	206 days	Independent	Antonio Maura	Alfonso XIII (1886–1931)	
Joaquín Fernández Prida (Note: Acting during absence of the Minister: Emilio de Palacios y Fau (27 July – 17 August 1922).) (1863–1942)	8 March 1922	4 December 1922	271 days	Conservative	José Sánchez-Guerra y Martínez	Alfonso XIII (1886–1931)	
Francisco Bergamín y García (1855–1937)	4 December 1922	7 December 1922	3 days	Conservative	José Sánchez-Guerra y Martínez	Alfonso XIII (1886–1931)	
Santiago Alba y Bonifaz (Note: Acting during absence of the Minister: Emilio de Palacios y Fau (1–8 May 1923).) (1872–1949)	7 December 1922	15 September 1923	282 days	Liberal	The Marquess of Alhucemas	Alfonso XIII (1886–1931)	
Fernando Espinosa de los Monteros y Bermejillo (1884–1937) (Note: Head of the Ministry, but without the rank of minister) (Note: Acting during the absences of the Minister: The Marquess of la Torre Hermosa (22–28 August 1924) and Servando Crespo y Bocolo (13 August – 1 September 1925).)	15 September 1923	3 December 1925	2 years, 79 days	Independent	The Marquess of Estella; Directorio Militar	Alfonso XIII (1886–1931)	
The Viscount of Santa Clara de Avedillo (1890–1974)	3 December 1925	20 February 1927	1 year, 79 days	Patriotic Unionist	The Marquess of Estella; Directorio Civil	Alfonso XIII (1886–1931)	
The Marquess of Estella (1870–1930) (Note: Prime Minister and Minister of Foreign Affairs)	20 February 1927	30 January 1930	2 years, 344 days	Patriotic Unionist	The Marquess of Estella; Directorio Civil	Alfonso XIII (1886–1931)	
The Count of Xauen (1873–1953)	30 January 1930	22 February 1930	23 days	Military	The Count of Xauen; Dictablanda	Alfonso XIII (1886–1931)	
The Duke of Alba (1878–1953)	22 February 1930	18 February 1931	361 days	Independent	The Count of Xauen; Dictablanda	Alfonso XIII (1886–1931)	
The Count of Romanones (1863–1950)	18 February 1931	14 April 1931	55 days	Liberal	Juan Bautista Aznar-Cabañas	Alfonso XIII (1886–1931)	
Alejandro Lerroux (1864–1949)	14 April 1931	16 December 1931	246 days	Radical Republican	Niceto Alcalá-Zamora	Niceto Alcalá-Zamora (1931–1936)	
Alejandro Lerroux (1864–1949)	14 April 1931	16 December 1931	246 days	Radical Republican	Manuel Azaña	Niceto Alcalá-Zamora (1931–1936)	
Luis de Zulueta (1878–1964)	16 December 1931	12 June 1933	1 year, 178 days	Radical Republican	Manuel Azaña	Niceto Alcalá-Zamora (1931–1936)	
Fernando de los Ríos (1879–1949)	12 June 1933	12 September 1933	92 days	Socialist	Manuel Azaña	Niceto Alcalá-Zamora (1931–1936)	
Claudio Sánchez-Albornoz (1893–1984)	12 September 1933	16 December 1933	95 days	Republican Action	Alejandro Lerroux	Niceto Alcalá-Zamora (1931–1936)	
Claudio Sánchez-Albornoz (1893–1984)	12 September 1933	16 December 1933	95 days	Republican Action	Diego Martínez Barrio	Niceto Alcalá-Zamora (1931–1936)	
Leandro Pita (1898–1985)	16 December 1933	4 October 1934	292 days	Independent	Alejandro Lerroux	Niceto Alcalá-Zamora (1931–1936)	
Leandro Pita (1898–1985)	16 December 1933	4 October 1934	292 days	Independent	Ricardo Samper	Niceto Alcalá-Zamora (1931–1936)	
Ricardo Samper (1881–1938)	4 October 1934	16 November 1934	43 days	Radical Republican	Alejandro Lerroux	Niceto Alcalá-Zamora (1931–1936)	
Juan José Rocha García (1877–1938) (Note: Until 23 January 1935 he acted in acting capacity.)	16 November 1934	25 September 1935	313 days	Radical Republican	Alejandro Lerroux	Niceto Alcalá-Zamora (1931–1936)	
Alejandro Lerroux (1864–1949)	25 September 1935	29 October 1935	34 days	Radical Republican	Joaquín Chapaprieta	Niceto Alcalá-Zamora (1931–1936)	
José Martínez de Velasco (1875–1936)	29 October 1935	30 December 1935	62 days	Agrarian	Joaquín Chapaprieta	Niceto Alcalá-Zamora (1931–1936)	
José Martínez de Velasco (1875–1936)	29 October 1935	30 December 1935	62 days	Agrarian	Manuel Portela Valladares	Niceto Alcalá-Zamora (1931–1936)	
Joaquín Urzáiz Cadaval (1887–1957)	30 December 1935	19 February 1936	51 days	Liberal Republican Right	Manuel Portela Valladares	Niceto Alcalá-Zamora (1931–1936)	
Augusto Barcia Trelles (1881–1961)	19 February 1936	18 July 1936	150 days	Republican Left	Manuel Azaña	Niceto Alcalá-Zamora (1931–1936)	
Augusto Barcia Trelles (1881–1961)	19 February 1936	18 July 1936	150 days	Republican Left	Augusto Barcia Trelles (Note: Acting prime minister from 10 to 13 May 1936)	Manuel Azaña (1936–1939)	
Augusto Barcia Trelles (1881–1961)	19 February 1936	18 July 1936	150 days	Republican Left	Santiago Casares Quiroga	Manuel Azaña (1936–1939)	
Justino de Azcárate (1903–1989)	18 July 1936	19 July 1936	1 day	National Republican	Diego Martínez Barrio	Manuel Azaña (1936–1939)	
Augusto Barcia Trelles (1881–1961)	19 July 1936	4 September 1936	47 days	Republican Left	José Giral	Manuel Azaña (1936–1939)	
Julio Álvarez del Vayo (1891–1975)	4 September 1936	17 May 1937	255 days	Socialist	Francisco Largo Caballero	Manuel Azaña (1936–1939)	
José Giral (1879–1962)	17 May 1937	5 April 1938	323 days	Republican Left	Juan Negrín	Manuel Azaña (1936–1939)	
Julio Álvarez del Vayo (1891–1975)	5 April 1938	5 March 1939	334 days	Socialist	Juan Negrín	Manuel Azaña (1936–1939)	
Julián Besteiro (1870–1940)	5 March 1939	31 March 1939	26 days	Socialist	National Defence Council	José Miaja (1939)	
Francisco Serrat y Bonastre (1871–1952) (Note: Secretary of Foreign Relations)	5 October 1936	22 April 1937	199 days	Independent	Junta Técnica del Estado	Francisco Franco (1939–1975)	
Miguel Ángel de Muguiro (1880–1954) acting secretary	22 April 1937	31 January 1938	284 days	Independent	Junta Técnica del Estado	Francisco Franco (1939–1975)	
The Count of Jordana (1876–1944)	31 January 1938 (Note: Until 31 March 1939, he was part of Franco's government during the Civil War; he was later confirmed in the first government.)	9 August 1939	1 year, 190 days	Military	I Franco	Francisco Franco (1939–1975)	
Juan Luis Beigbeder (1888–1957)	9 August 1939	16 October 1940	1 year, 68 days	Movimiento Nacional	II Franco	Francisco Franco (1939–1975)	
Ramón Serrano Suñer (1901–2003)	16 October 1940	3 September 1942	1 year, 322 days	Movimiento Nacional	II Franco	Francisco Franco (1939–1975)	
The Count of Jordana (1876–1944)	3 September 1942	3 August 1944†	1 year, 335 days	Movimiento Nacional	II Franco	Francisco Franco (1939–1975)	
José Félix de Lequerica y Erquiza (1890–1963)	11 August 1944	20 July 1945	343 days	Movimiento Nacional	II Franco	Francisco Franco (1939–1975)	
Alberto Martín-Artajo Álvarez (1905–1979)	20 July 1945	25 February 1957	11 years, 220 days	Movimiento Nacional	III Franco	Francisco Franco (1939–1975)	
Alberto Martín-Artajo Álvarez (1905–1979)	20 July 1945	25 February 1957	11 years, 220 days	Movimiento Nacional	IV Franco	Francisco Franco (1939–1975)	
Fernando María Castiella (1907–1976)	25 February 1957	29 October 1969	12 years, 246 days	Movimiento Nacional	VII Franco	Francisco Franco (1939–1975)	
Fernando María Castiella (1907–1976)	25 February 1957	29 October 1969	12 years, 246 days	Movimiento Nacional	VI Franco	Francisco Franco (1939–1975)	
Fernando María Castiella (1907–1976)	25 February 1957	29 October 1969	12 years, 246 days	Movimiento Nacional	VII Franco	Francisco Franco (1939–1975)	
Gregorio López-Bravo (1923–1985)	29 October 1969	11 June 1973	3 years, 225 days	Movimiento Nacional	VIII Franco	Francisco Franco (1939–1975)	
Laureano López Rodó (1920–2000)	11 June 1973	3 January 1974	206 days	Movimiento Nacional	Luis Carrero Blanco (Note: The Duke of Fernández-Miranda was acting prime minister from 20 to 29 December 1973, and The Marquess of Arias Navarro from December 29 to 3 January 1974.)	Francisco Franco (1939–1975)	
Pedro Cortina Mauri (1908–1993)	3 January 1974	11 December 1975	1 year, 342 days	Movimiento Nacional	The Marquess of Arias Navarro	Francisco Franco (1939–1975)	
Pedro Cortina Mauri (1908–1993)	3 January 1974	11 December 1975	1 year, 342 days	Movimiento Nacional	The Marquess of Arias Navarro	Juan Carlos I (1975–2014)	
The Count of Motrico (1909–1998)	11 December 1975	7 July 1976	209 days	Movimiento Nacional	The Marquess of Arias Navarro	Juan Carlos I (1975–2014)	
The Marquess of Oreja (1935–)	7 July 1976	8 September 1980	4 years, 63 days	Centrist	The Duke of Suárez	Juan Carlos I (1975–2014)	
José Pedro Pérez-Llorca (1940–2019)	8 September 1980	2 December 1982	2 years, 85 days	Centrist	The Duke of Suárez	Juan Carlos I (1975–2014)	
José Pedro Pérez-Llorca (1940–2019)	8 September 1980	2 December 1982	2 years, 85 days	Centrist	The Marquess of Ría de Ribadeo	Juan Carlos I (1975–2014)	
Fernando Morán (1926–2020)	2 December 1982	4 July 1985	2 years, 214 days	Socialist	Felipe González	Juan Carlos I (1975–2014)	
Francisco Fernández Ordóñez (1930–1992)	4 July 1985	23 June 1992	6 years, 355 days	Socialist	Felipe González	Juan Carlos I (1975–2014)	
Javier Solana (1942–)	23 June 1992	18 December 1995	3 years, 178 days	Socialist	Felipe González	Juan Carlos I (1975–2014)	
Carlos Westendorp (1937–2026)	18 December 1995	5 May 1996	139 days	Socialist	Felipe González	Juan Carlos I (1975–2014)	
Abel Matutes (1941–)	5 May 1996	27 April 2000	3 years, 358 days	Popular	José María Aznar	Juan Carlos I (1975–2014)	
Josep Piqué (1955–2023)	27 April 2000	10 July 2002	2 years, 74 days	Popular	José María Aznar	Juan Carlos I (1975–2014)	
Ana Palacio (1948–)	9 July 2002	17 April 2004	1 year, 283 days	Popular	José María Aznar	Juan Carlos I (1975–2014)	
Miguel Ángel Moratinos (1951–)	17 April 2004	20 October 2010	6 years, 186 days	Socialist	José Luis Rodríguez Zapatero	Juan Carlos I (1975–2014)	
Trinidad Jiménez (1962–)	20 October 2010	21 December 2011	1 year, 62 days	Socialist	José Luis Rodríguez Zapatero	Juan Carlos I (1975–2014)	
José Manuel García-Margallo (1944–)	21 December 2011	3 November 2016	4 years, 318 days	Popular	Mariano Rajoy	Juan Carlos I (1975–2014)	
José Manuel García-Margallo (1944–)	21 December 2011	3 November 2016	4 years, 318 days	Popular	Mariano Rajoy	Felipe VI (2014-presente)	
Alfonso Dastis (1955–)	3 November 2016	6 June 2018	1 year, 215 days	Independent	Mariano Rajoy	Felipe VI (2014-presente)	
Josep Borrell (1947–)	6 June 2018	30 November 2019	1 year, 177 days	Socialist	Pedro Sánchez	Felipe VI (2014-presente)	
Margarita Robles (1956–) acting minister	30 November 2019	12 January 2020	43 days	Independent	Pedro Sánchez	Felipe VI (2014-presente)	
Arancha González Laya (1969–)	12 January 2020	10 July 2021	1 year, 179 days	Independent	Pedro Sánchez	Felipe VI (2014-presente)	
José Manuel Albares (1972–)	10 July 2021	Incumbent	5 years, 126 days	Socialist	Pedro Sánchez	Felipe VI (2014-presente)	

== See also ==
- Foreign relations of Spain
