= Augusto Ulloa y Castañón =

Spanish lawyer, politician and journalist

Augusto Ulloa

Augusto Ulloa y Castañón (1823 in Santiago de Compostela, Spain – 1879 in Madrid, Spain) was a Spanish lawyer, politician and journalist who served twice as Minister of State, in 1871, during the reign of King Amadeo I, and in 1874, under the presidency of Francisco Serrano, 1st Duke of la Torre, in the First Spanish Republic.

Political offices
Preceded by Bonifacio de Blas	Minister of State; 26 May 1872 – 13 June 1872	Succeeded by Cristino Martos
Preceded by Práxedes Mateo Sagasta	Minister of State; 13 May 1874 – 31 December 1874	Succeeded by Alejandro de Castro
