= Cristino Martos y Balbí =

Spanish politician (1830–1893)

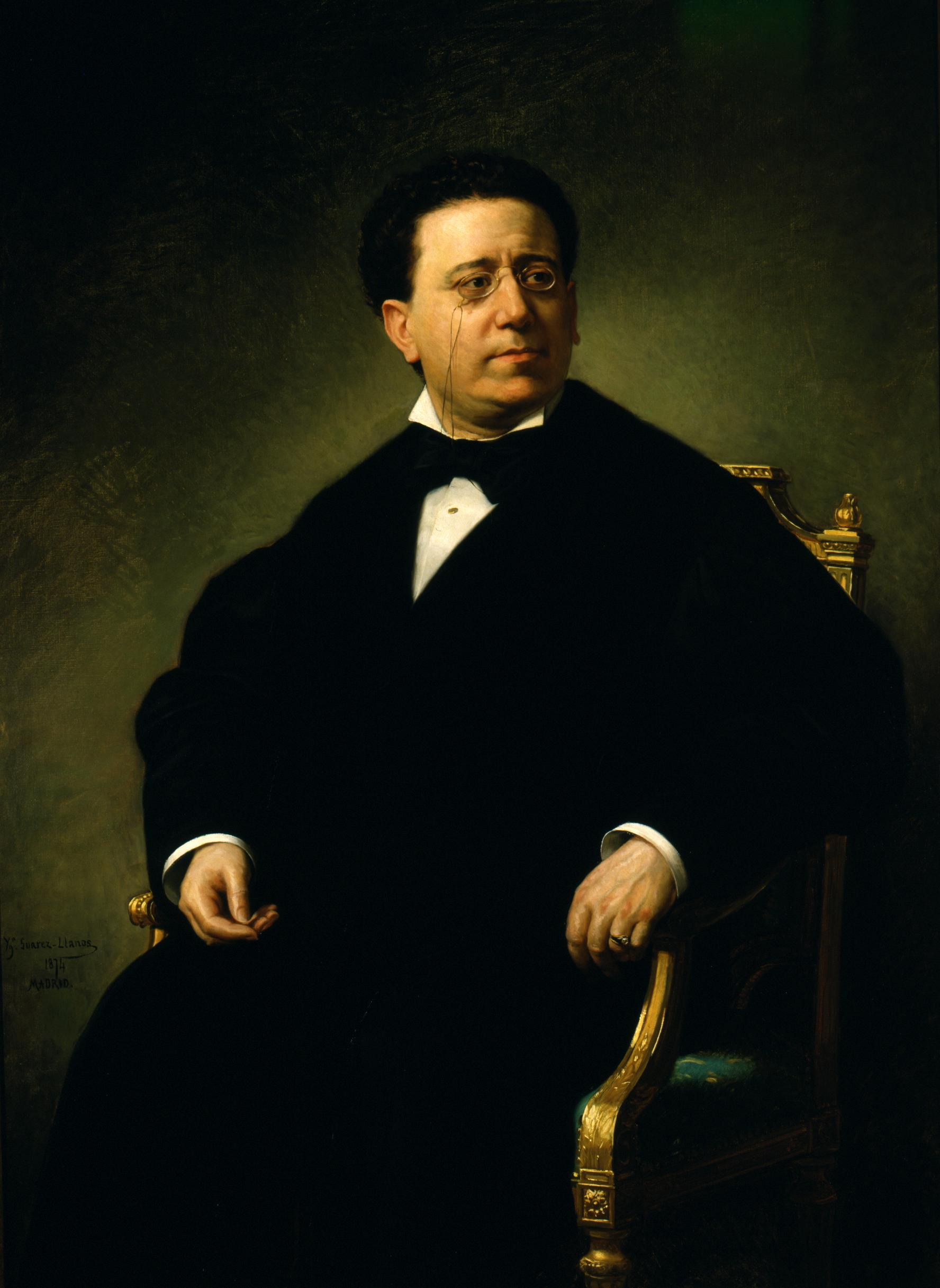
Cristino Martos

Cristino Martos y Balbí (13 September 1830, in Granada, Spain – 17 January 1893, in Madrid, Spain) was a Spanish politician and lawyer who served as Minister of State from 1869 to 1870, in a cabinet headed by Juan Prim, 1st Marquis of los Castillejos, and held other important offices such as Mayor of Madrid. He was a member of the Radical Democratic Party.

== Biography ==
He was educated there and at Madrid University, where his Radicalism soon got him into trouble, and he narrowly escaped being expelled for his share in student riots and other demonstrations against the governments of Queen Isabella. He distinguished himself as a journalist on El Tribuno.
He joined O'Donnell and Baldomero Espartero, Count of Luchana in 1854 against a revolutionary cabinet, and shortly afterwards turned against O'Donnell to assist the Democrats and Progressists under Juan Prim, Rivero, Emilio Castelar y Ripoll, and Práxedes Mateo Sagasta it the unsuccessful movements of 1866, and was obliged to go abroad. His political career had not prevented Martos from rising into note at the bar, where he was successful for forty years.

After remaining abroad three years, he returned to Spain to take his seat in the Cortes of 1869 after the revolution of 1868. Throughout the revolutionary period he represented in cabinets with Prim, Serrano and Manuel Ruiz Zorrilla, and lastly under King Amadeus, the advanced Radical tendencies of the men who wanted to give Spain a democratic monarchy. After the abdication of Amadeus of Savoy, Martos played a prominent part in the proclamation of the federal republic, in the struggle between the executive of that republic and the permanent committee of the Cortes, backed by the generals and militia, who nearly put an end to the executive and republic in April 1873. When the republicans triumphed Martos retired into exile, and soon afterwards into private life. He reappeared for a few months after General Pavias coup d'état in January 1874, to join a coalition cabinet formed by Marshal Serrano, with Sagasta and Ulloa.

Martos returned to the Bar in May 1874, and quietly looked on when the restoration took place at the end of that year. He stuck to his democratic ideals for some years, even going to Biarritz in 1881 to be present at a republican congress presided over by Ruiz Zorilla. Shortly afterwards Martos joined the dynastic Left organized by Marshal Serrano, General Lopez Dominguez, and Moret, Becerra, Balaguer, and other quondam, revolutionaries. He sat in several parliaments of the reign of Alphonso XII. and of the regency of Queen Christina, joined the dynastic Liberals under Sagasta, and gave Sagasta not a little trouble when the latter allowed him to preside over the House of Deputies. Having failed to form a rival party against Sagasta, Martos subsided into political insignificance, despite his great talent as an orator and debater, and died in Madrid on 16 January 1893.

Political offices
Preceded by Manuel Silvela	Minister of State; 1 November 1869 – 9 January 1870	Succeeded by Práxedes Mateo Sagasta
Preceded by Juan Bautista Topete	Minister of State; 4 January 1871 – 24 June 1871	Succeeded by The Marquis of Mendigorría; Acting
Preceded by Augusto Ulloa	Minister of State; 13 June 1872 – 11 February 1873	Succeeded by Emilio Castelar
