= Bonifacio de Blas y Muñoz =

Spanish politician and lawyer

Bonifacio de Blas

Bonifacio de Blas y Muñoz (1827 in Villacastín, Spain – 1880 in Madrid, Spain) was a Spanish politician and lawyer who served as Minister of State from 1871 to 1872, in a cabinet headed by Práxedes Mateo Sagasta, during the reign of King Amadeo I of Spain.

Political offices
Preceded by The Marquis of San Rafael; Acting	Minister of State; 20 November 1871 – 26 May 1872	Succeeded by Augusto Ulloa
