= Manuel Ruiz Zorrilla =

Spanish politician (1833–1895)

The Most Excellent Manuel Ruiz Zorrilla
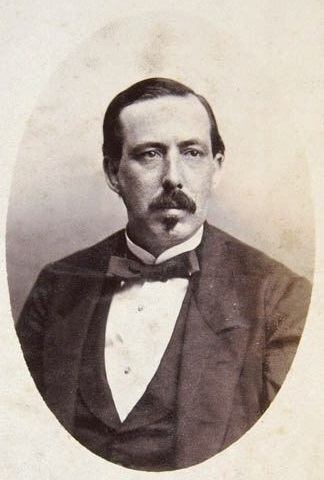
- Photographed by J. Laurent, c. 1865–1870

Prime Minister of Spain
- In office 24 July 1871 – 5 October 1871
- Monarch: Amadeo
- Preceded by: Francisco Serrano
- Succeeded by: José Malcampo
- In office 16 June 1872 – 12 February 1873
- Monarch: Amadeo
- Preceded by: Fernando Fernández de Córdova (acting)
- Succeeded by: Estanislao Figueras

Personal details
- Born: 22 March 1833 Burgo de Osma, Spain
- Died: 13 June 1895 (aged 62 years) Burgos, Spain
- Party: Progressive Party; Radical Democratic Party; Progressive Republican Party

Manuel Ruiz Zorrilla (22 March 1833 – 13 June 1895) was a Spanish politician. He served as Prime Minister of Spain for a little over ten weeks, in the summer of 1871, and again for eight months, between June 1872 and February 1873.

== Biography ==
Born in Burgo de Osma, he was educated at Valladolid and studied law at the Central University of Madrid, where he leaned towards radicalism in politics. In 1856, he was elected deputy and soon attracted notice among the most advanced Progressists and Democrats.

Ruiz Zorrilla took part in the revolutionary propaganda that led to the military movement in Madrid on 22 June 1866. He had to take refuge in France for two years, like his fellow conspirators, but he returned to Spain when the revolution of 1868 took place. He was one of the members of the first cabinet after the revolution, and in 1869, under the regency of Marshal Serrano, he became Minister of Grace and Justice. In 1870, he was elected President of the Congress of Deputies and seconded Juan Prim in offering the throne to Amadeus of Savoy. He went to Italy as President of the Commission and carried, to the Prince at Florence, the official news of his election.

Initiated as Freemason in the Mantuana Lodge in Madrid by July 1870, Ruiz Zorrilla (symbol: Cavour; degree: 33) barely took days to become Grand Master of the Grand Orient of Spain Grand Lodge in a process full of irregularities, serving in that capacity until 1 January 1874. Ruiz Zorrilla did not actually preside over nor attend the meetings, and successively delegated the chair of the lodge to Simón Gris Benítez, Manuel Llano y Persi and José Carvajal.

On the arrival of Amadeus in Spain, Ruiz Zorrilla became Minister of Public Works for a short time before resigning in protest against Serrano and Topete entering the councils of the new king. Six months later, in 1871, he was invited by Amadeus to form a cabinet, and he continued to be the principal councillor of the king until February 1873, when the monarch abdicated.

After the departure of Amadeus, Ruiz Zorrilla advocated the establishment of a republic, but he was not called upon either by the Federal Republicans to help them during 1873 or by Marshal Serrano in 1874 to join Martos and Sagasta in his cabinet. Immediately after the Restoration of the monarchy, early in 1875, Ruiz Zorrilla again went to France.

He was for nearly 18 years the soul of the republican conspiracies, the prompter of revolutionary propaganda and the chief inspirer of intrigues concerted by discontented military men of all ranks. He gave so much trouble to the Madrid governments that they organized a watch over him with the assistance of the French government and police, especially when it was discovered that the two military movements of August 1883 and September 1886 had been prepared and assisted by him. During the last two years of his life, he became less active. Failing health and the loss of his wife had decreased his energies, and the Madrid government allowed him to return to Spain some months before he died at Burgos, of heart disease.

== Notes ==
Government offices
Preceded by	Minister of Development; 1868–1869	Succeeded by José Echegaray
Preceded by Cristóbal Martín de Herrera	Minister of Grace of Justice; 1869–1870	Succeeded by Eugenio Montero Ríos
Preceded by Nicolás María Rivero	President of the Congress of Deputies; 1870–1871	Succeeded by Salustiano de Olózaga
Preceded by José Echegaray	Minister of Development; 1871	Succeeded by Santiago Diego-Madrazo
Preceded by Francisco Serrano	President of the Council of Ministers; 1871	Succeeded by José Malcampo Monge
Preceded by Práxedes Mateo Sagasta	Minister of Governation; 1871	Succeeded by Francisco de Paula Candau
Preceded by Francisco Serrano	President of the Council of Ministers; 1872–1873	Succeeded by Estanislao Figueras
Preceded by Francisco de Paula Candau	Minister of Governation; 1872–1873	Succeeded by Francisco Pi y Margall
Masonic offices
Preceded by Carlos Magnán	Grand Master of the Grand Orient of Spain; 1870–1874	Succeeded by Juan de la Somera
