= Juan Álvarez de Lorenzana, 10th Viscount of Barrantes =

Spanish noble, politician and journalist

The Viscount of Barrantes

Don Juan Álvarez de Lorenzana y Guerrero, 10th Viscount of Barrantes (29 August 1818, in Oviedo, Principality of Asturias, Spain – 15 July 1883, in Madrid, Spain) was a Spanish noble, politician and journalist who served as Minister of State from 1868 to 1869, in a cabinet headed by Francisco Serrano, 1st Duke of la Torre.

In his early political career, Lorenzana was member of the Moderate Party, but then he moved to the Liberal Union and was involved in the Spanish Glorious Revolution of 1868, which deposed Queen Isabella II and opened a period known as The Democratic Sexenium. It was in one of the cabinets for this period when Lorenzana was appointed Minister of State.

In 1874, he was appointed Ambassador of Spain to the Holy See, and after the restoration of King Alfonso XII, held other offices such as Councillor of State, Senator and Deputy, and was awarded with the Grand Crosses of the Orders of Charles III and Isabella the Catholic.

Political offices
Preceded by The Marquis of Roncali	Minister of State; 8 October 1868 – 18 June 1869	Succeeded by Manuel Silvela
