= Fernando Fernández de Córdova =

Spanish politician (1809-1883)

The Most Excellent Fernando Fernández de Córdova
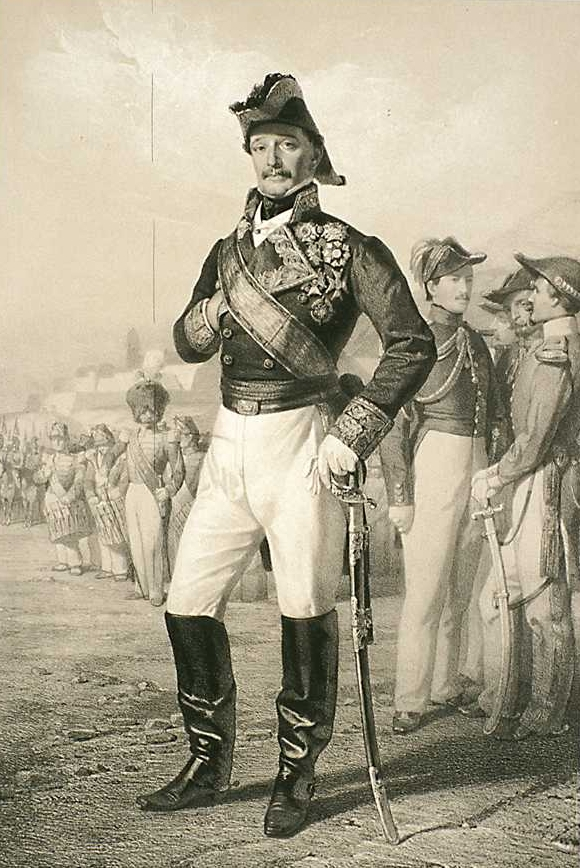

Prime Minister of Spain
- In office 17 July 1854 – 18 July 1854
- Monarch: Isabella II
- Preceded by: Luis José Sartorius
- Succeeded by: Angel de Saavedra
- Acting
- In office 13 June 1872 – 16 June 1872
- Monarch: Amadeo I
- Preceded by: Francisco Serrano
- Succeeded by: Manuel Ruiz Zorrilla

Minister of State of Spain
- Acting
- In office 24 July – 5 October 1871
- Monarch: Amadeo I
- Prime Minister: Manuel Ruiz Zorrilla
- Preceded by: Cristino Martos y Balbí
- Succeeded by: José Malcampo

Minister of War of Spain
- In office 31 August – 3 November 1847
- Monarch: Isabella II
- Prime Minister: Joaquín Francisco Pacheco; Florencio García Goyena; Ramón María Narváez
- Preceded by: Manuel Mazarredo
- Succeeded by: Ramón María Narváez
- In office 17 July – 30 July 1854
- Monarch: Isabella II
- Prime Minister: Himself; Baldomero Espartero
- Preceded by: Anselmo Blaser
- Succeeded by: Leopoldo O'Donnell
- In office 16 September 1864 – 30 March 1865
- Monarch: Isabella II
- Prime Minister: Ramón María Narváez
- Preceded by: José María Marchessi y Oleaga
- Succeeded by: Felipe Rivero y Lemoine
- Acting
- In office 24 July – 5 October 1871
- Monarch: Amadeo I
- Prime Minister: Manuel Ruiz Zorrilla
- Preceded by: Francisco Serrano (as acting)
- Succeeded by: Joaquín Bassols
- In office 13 June 1872 – 24 February 1873
- Monarch: Amadeo I
- Prime Minister: Manuel Ruiz Zorrilla
- President of the Executive Power: Estanislao Figueras
- Preceded by: Francisco Serrano
- Succeeded by: Juan Acosta Muñoz

Minister of the Navy of Spain
- In office 5 October – 24 October 1847
- Monarch: Isabella II
- Prime Minister: Ramón María Narváez; Serafín María de Sotto
- Preceded by: Juan de Dios Sotelo Machín
- Succeeded by: Manuel Bertrán de Lis y Ribes

Captain General of Catalonia
- In office 4 September – 27 November 1848
- Monarch: Isabella II
- Prime Minister: Joaquín Francisco Pacheco; Florencio García Goyena; Ramón María Narváez
- Minister of War: Francisco de Paula Figueras
- Preceded by: Manuel Pavía y Lacy
- Succeeded by: Manuel Gutiérrez de la Concha

Personal details
- Born: Fernando Fernández de Córdova y Valcárcel; 2 September 1809 Buenos Aires, Viceroyalty of the Río de la Plata, Spain
- Died: 30 October 1883 (aged 74) Madrid, Spain

Don Fernando Fernández de Córdova y Valcárcel, 2nd Marquis of Mendigorría (2 September 1809, in Buenos Aires – 30 October 1883, in Madrid), was a Spanish military, politician, and prime minister of Spain for one day.

== Biography ==
Born into a military family as the son of José de Córdoba y Rojas, he and his brother Luis fought in the First Carlist War on the side of Isabelinos. He belonged to the Partido Moderado.

In 1848, he became Lieutenant General and as Captain General of Catalonia during the Second Carlist War, he put down the isolated rebel cells in that region by early 1849.

In May 1849 he was sent to Italy to help to protect Pope Pius IX against the Italian Revolution of 1848. He led a force of 4,000 Spanish soldiers, who were deployed in Gaeta and placed at the Pope's disposition. This marked the Spanish Army's first expeditionary venture into Italy since the War of the Austrian Succession a hundred years prior. Spanish columns secured the region and assisted the French in their operations at Itri.

He became minister of war and was even prime minister for one day (18 July 1854) in full political crisis, which ended when Baldomero Espartero became head of the "progressive Biennium" of 1854–1856.

Fernando had always supported Queen Isabella II, but backed the Revolution of 1868 against the Crown, and joined the Radical Democratic Party.

In 1872, under King Amadeo I, he became acting prime minister between 13 June and 16 June, before retiring completely from political life in 1873.

Political offices
| Preceded by Cristino Martos | Minister of State; Acting; 24 June – 5 October 1871 | Succeeded by The Marquess of San Rafael; Acting |
