= Duke of la Torre =

Dukedom of Spain

Dukedom of la Torre
- Creation date: 24 November 1862
- Created by: Isabella II
- Peerage: Peerage of Spain
- First holder: Francisco Serrano y Domínguez, 1st Duke of la Torre
- Present holder: Carlos Martínez de Campos y Carulla, 5th Duke of la Torre
- Heir apparent: Carla Martínez de Campos y de Montenegro

Duke of la Torre (Spanish: Duque de la Torre) is a hereditary title in the Peerage of Spain, accompanied by the dignity of Grandee and granted in 1862 by Isabella II to Francisco Serrano, Count consort of San Antonio, in acknowledgement of his loyalty during his time as Captain General of Cuba.

== Dukes of la Torre ==
1. Francisco Serrano y Domínguez, 1st Duke of la Torre
2. Francisco María Buenaventura Serrano y Domínguez, 2nd Duke of la Torre
3. Carlos Ignacio Martínez de Campos y Serrano, 3rd Duke of la Torre
4. Leopoldo Martínez de Campos y Muñoz, 4th Duke of la Torre
5. Carlos Martínez de Campos y Carulla, 5th Duke of la Torre

== See also ==
- List of dukes in the peerage of Spain
- List of current grandees of Spain

== Bibliography ==
- Houghton, A. E. (1911). "Serrano y Dominguez, Francisco" . In Chisholm, Hugh (ed.). Encyclopædia Britannica. Vol. 24 (11th ed.). Cambridge University Press. pp. 682–683.
