= Antonia Domínguez y Borrell =

Spanish noblewoman (1831–1917)

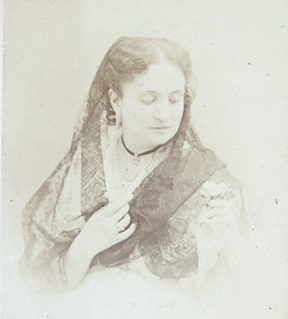
- Photographed by André Disdéri (c. 1860–80)
- Born: Antonia María Micaela Domínguez y Borrell; 13 June 1831; Cuba, Spanish Empire
- Died: 5 January 1917 (aged 85); Biarritz, France
- Other names: La mariscala, la generala, la regenta, la duquesa republicana, la gran señora del Gobierno Provisional
- Spouse(s): Francisco Serrano y Domínguez, Duke of La Torre (m. 1850; died 1885)

Antonia Domínguez y Borrell (1831–1917) also known as the Duchess of La Torre (Spanish: duquesa de la Torre), was a Spanish noblewoman who played an influential role in Spanish politics and society during the Sexenio Democrático. She held the nobiliary title of Countess of San Antonio.

== Biography ==
=== Early life ===
She was born in the Captaincy General of Cuba in 1831, reportedly in Havana. Her family owned a number of ingenios. She married her cousin Francisco Serrano y Domínguez, 20 years her senior, on 29 September 1850 in Madrid.

She became a Dame of the Order of Maria Luisa in 1856.

=== Sexenio democrático ===
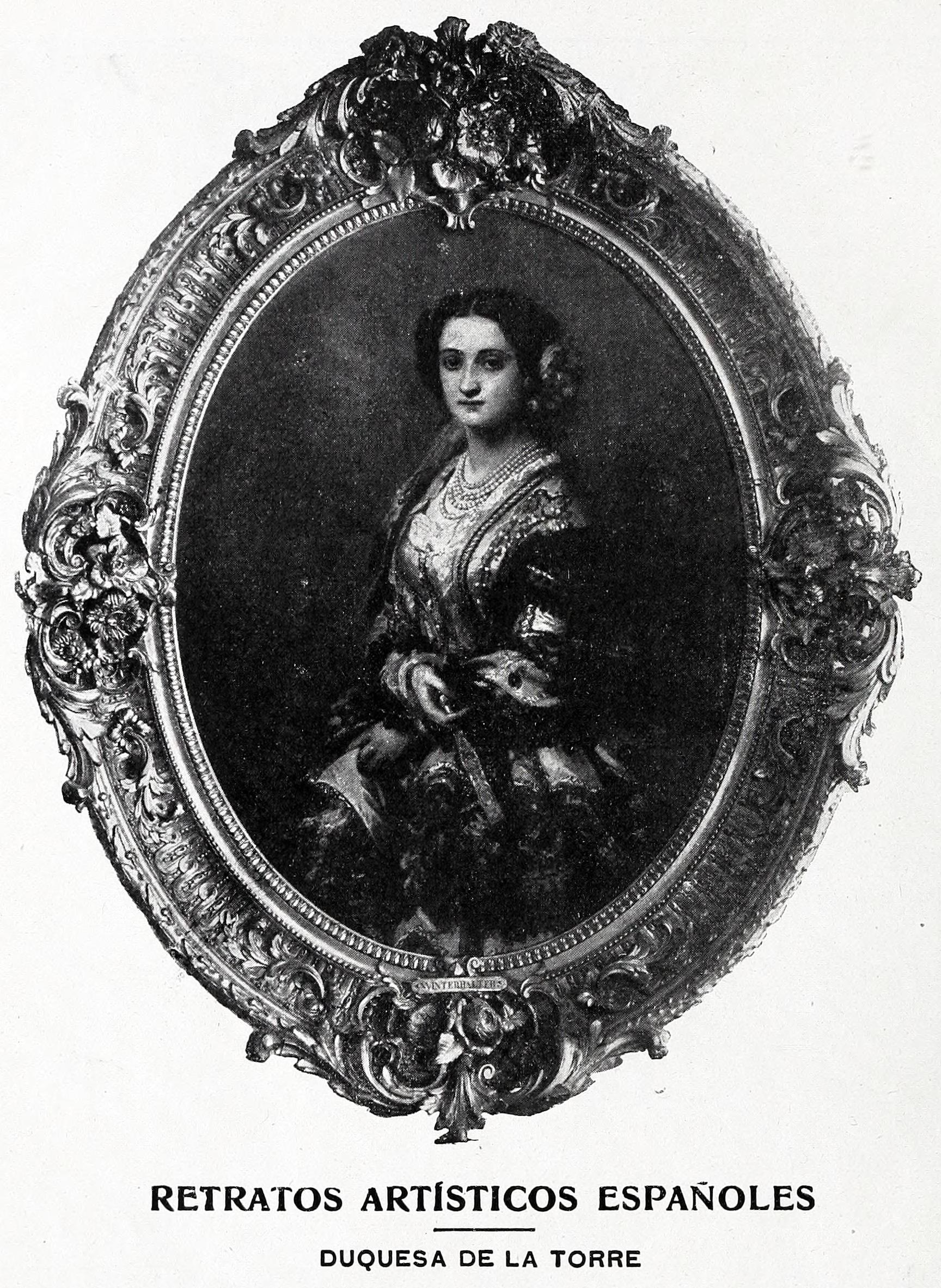
Engraving of a portrait by Winterhalter

Following the overthrow of Isabella II in the 1868 Glorious Revolution, many members of the aristocracy vied for the return of the Bourbons; however the Duchess of La Torre (whose husband soon became President of the Provisional Government and later Regent of the Realm) had no interest whatsoever in such prospect and confronted the likes of Sofia Trubetskaya, the Duchess of Sesto and Marchioness of Alcañices, founding a rival political salon in Madrid. Always involved in the affairs of her husband, both political and particular, she also displayed a mutual animadversion and rivalry towards Francisca Agüero, the widow duchess of Prim.

Following the election of Amadeo of Savoy to the Spanish throne in 1870, the new king offered Antonia Domínguez the Court post of Camarera mayor de la Reina but she rejected it.

After the coup of Pavía in January 1874, she became a prominent figure of the First Spanish Republic, which became presided by her husband as a sort of Spanish MacMahon. According to Charles Benoist; when Serrano left the capital to fight the Carlists in the north, the Republic was not left without a President as she was the real president, becoming even more of a president once her husband returned. During this period she continued with her anti-alfonsine activity, opposing the possibility of the restoration of the monarchy in the person of Alfonso, the son of Isabella II.

=== Later life ===
By 1883, the dukes of La Torre saw their reputation damaged after the international scandal caused by the divorce of their son Francisco from Mercedes Martínez de Campos, who had married the former in October 1880 after reportedly undergoing harassment by Antonia Domínguez.

Following the death of her husband in 1885 Antonia Domínguez retired from public life. She built a theatre in his Madrilenian address, the Teatro Ventura. By the late 1880s, she was however linked to alleged intrigues with former queen Isabella (who also lived in France), Romero Robledo and López Domínguez to avoid Sagasta getting to power. Having lived in Paris, she ultimately settled in Biarritz, where she died on 5 January 1917.

Spanish nobility
Preceded by Miguel Domínguez Guevara	Countess of San Antonio; 1858–1881	Succeeded by Francisco Serrano y Domínguez
