= Saturnino Calderón Collantes =

Spanish politician & noble (1799–1864)

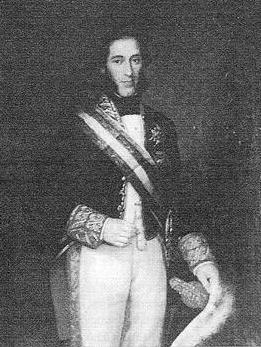
Saturnino Calderón de la Barca

Saturnino Calderón de la Barca y Collantes (1799– 7 October 1864) was a Spanish noble and politician who served as Minister of State from 1858 to 1863, during the reign of Queen Isabella II of Spain and in a cabinet headed by Leopoldo O'Donnell, 1st Duke of Tetuan.

He was a senator for life from 1847 until 1864.

== Biography ==
He was born at Reinosa, the eldest son of Manuel Santiago Calderón de la Barca y Rodríguez-Fontecha, Senator for Cantabria, and his wife Saturnina Collantes y Fonegra. His younger brother Fernando Calderón de la Barca, 1st Marquis of Reinosa was also a prominent politician who held important offices.

Among other honours, Calderón was appointed Knight Grand Cross of the Orders of Charles III, Isabella the Catholic, Pius IX, the Légion d'honneur, the Immaculate Conception of Vila Viçosa, the Ludwigsorden, the Dannebrog, the Polar Star, the Royal Guelphic Order and Saint Januarius, and Knight Grand Cordon of the Order of Leopold of Belgium.

He died at Paris in 1864.

== Sources ==
- Ruiz Gómez, Fernando, The Collantes Family. (in Spanish)
- Personal dossier of D. Saturnino Calderón de la Barca. Spanish Senate

Political offices
Preceded by The Count of Lucena	Minister of State; 2 July 1858 – 17 January 1863	Succeeded by The Duke of la Torre
