= Juan Bautista Topete =

Spanish Navy officer and politician (1821–1885)

Admiral The Most Excellent Juan Bautista Topete
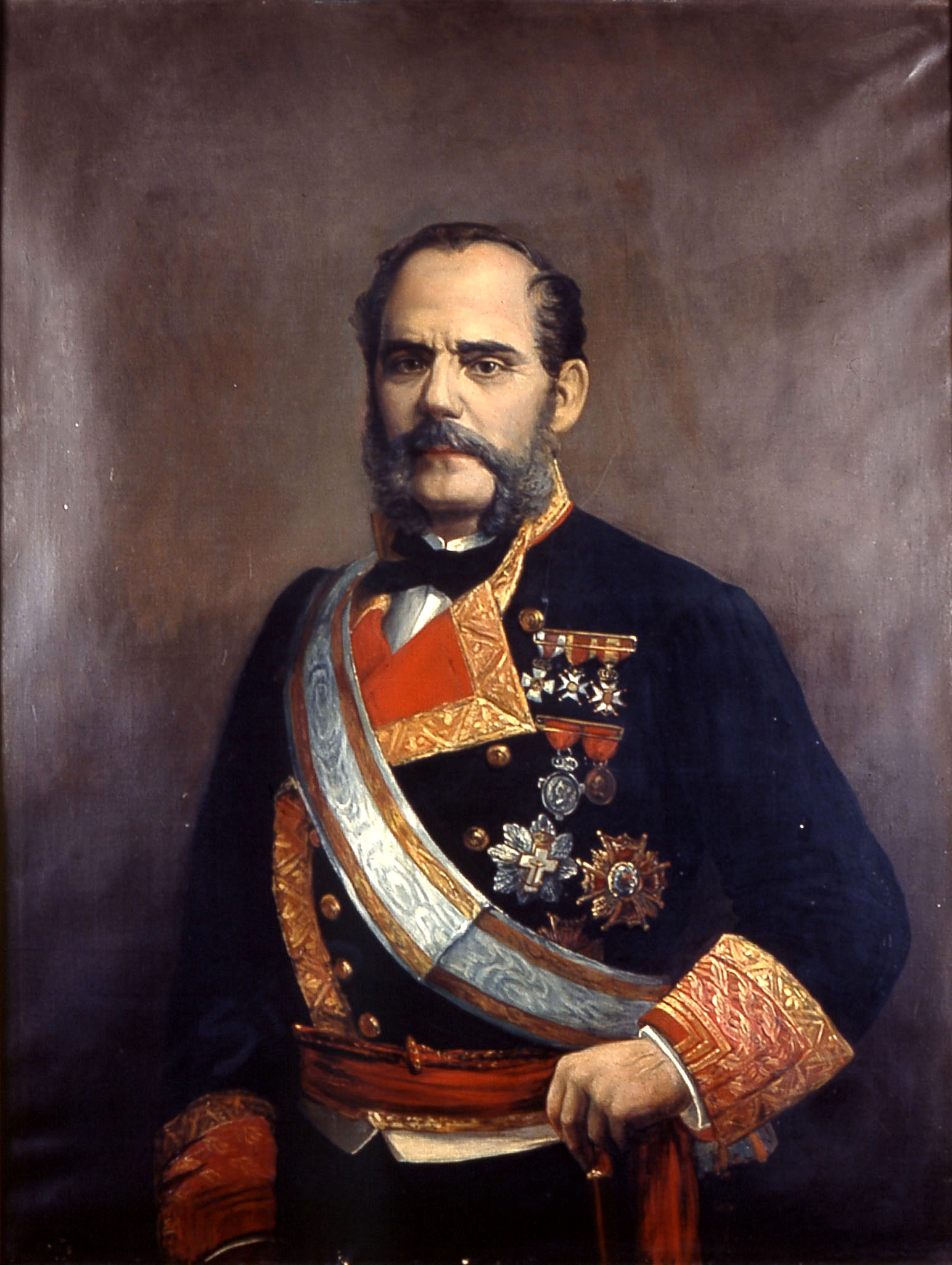
- Portrait by Rafael Monleón

Prime Minister of Spain
- Interim
- In office 27 December 1870 – 4 January 1871
- Monarch: Amadeo I
- Preceded by: Juan Prim
- Succeeded by: Francisco Serrano

Minister of the Navy of Spain
- In office 3 January 1874 – 13 May 1874
- President: Francisco Serrano
- Prime Minister: Francisco Serrano; Juan de Zavala
- Preceded by: José Oreyro y Villavicencio
- Succeeded by: Rafael Rodríguez Arias
- In office 26 May 1872 – 13 June 1872
- Monarch: Amadeo I
- Prime Minister: Francisco Serrano
- Preceded by: José Malcampo
- Succeeded by: José María Beránger
- In office 9 January 1870 – 20 March 1870
- Monarchs: Vacant; (Francisco Serrano as Regent)
- Prime Minister: Juan Prim
- Preceded by: Juan Prim
- Succeeded by: José María Beránger
- In office 8 October 1868 – 6 November 1869
- Monarchs: Vacant; (Francisco Serrano as Regent)
- Prime Minister: Francisco Serrano; Juan Prim
- Preceded by: Antonio de Estrada
- Succeeded by: Juan Prim

Minister of State of Spain
- In office 27 December 1870 – 4 January 1871
- Monarch: Amadeo I
- Prime Minister: Himself
- Preceded by: Práxedes Mateo Sagasta
- Succeeded by: Cristino Martos y Balbí

Minister of War of Spain
- Interim
- In office 27 December 1870 – 4 January 1871
- Monarch: Amadeo I
- Prime Minister: Himself
- Preceded by: Juan Prim
- Succeeded by: Francisco Serrano

Personal details
- Born: Juan Bautista Topete y Carballo; 24 May 1821 San Andrés Tuxtla, New Spain
- Died: 29 October 1885 (aged 64) Madrid, Spain

Juan Bautista Topete y Carballo (24 May 1821 – 29 October 1885) was a Spanish Navy officer and politician. He was born in San Andrés Tuxtla, Mexico. His father and grandfather were also Spanish admirals. He entered the navy at the age of seventeen, cut out a Carlist vessel in 1839, and became a midshipman at twenty-two, obtaining the cross of naval merit for saving the life of a sailor in 1841 and became a lieutenant in 1845. He served on the West Indian station for three years, and was engaged in repressing the slave trade before he was promoted frigate captain in 1857. He was promoted chief of staff to the fleet during the Moroccan War, 1859, after which he received the crosses of Saint Ferdinad and Saint Hermenegild.

Having been appointed chief of the Carrara arsenal at Cádiz, he was elected a deputy and joined the Union Liberal of O'Donnell and Serrano. He was sent out to the Pacific in command of the frigate Reina Blanca, and was present at the bombardment of Valparaíso and Callao, where he was badly wounded, and in other engagements of the war with Chile and Peru.

On his return to Spain, Topete was made port captain at Cádiz, which enabled him to take the lead of the conspiracy in the fleet against the Bourbon monarchy. He sent the steamer Buenaventura to the Canary Islands for Serrano and the other exiles; and when Prim and Sagasta arrived from Gibraltar, the whole fleet under the influence of Topete took such an attitude that the people, garrison and authorities of Cádiz followed suit.

Topete took part in all the posts of the revolutionary government, accepted the post of marine minister, was elected a member of the Cortes in 1869, and supported the pretensions of Antoine, Duke of Montpensier. He initially opposed the election of Amadeus, but latter sat on several cabinets seats of that king's reign. He was prosecuted by the federal republic of 1873 and again took charge of the marine under Serrano in 1874. After the Restoration, he was held aloof for many years, but finally accepted the presidency of a naval board in 1877. Later, he sat in the Senate as a life peer until his death in Madrid.

Political offices
Preceded by The Marquis of los Castillejos	Prime Minister of Spain; 27 December 1870 – 4 January 1871	Succeeded by The Duke of la Torre
Preceded by Práxedes Mateo Sagasta	Minister of State; 27 December 1870 – 4 January 1871	Succeeded by Cristino Martos
