= Manuel Silvela y Le Vielleuze =

Spanish politician, lawyer, writer and journalist

The Most Excellent Manuel Silvela
- Born: Manuel Silvela y Le Vielleuze; 9 March 1830; Paris, France
- Died: 25 May 1892 (aged 62); Madrid, Spain

Seat U of the Real Academia Española
- In office 25 March 1871 – 25 May 1892
- Preceded by: Mateo Seoane Sobral
- Succeeded by: Francisco García Ayuso

Manuel Silvela y Le Vielleuze KStJ (9 March 1830, in Paris, Kingdom of France – 25 May 1892, in Madrid, Kingdom of Spain) was a Spanish politician, lawyer, writer and journalist who held several importante governmental offices, such as Minister of State and Councillor of State.

Silvela was son of the prominent lawyer Francisco Agustín Silvela y Blanco and wife Luisa de le Vielleuze y Sotés, and brother of the also politician Francisco Silvela.

== Decorations and awards ==
He was awarded the Collar of the Order of Charles III and the Grand Cross of the Légion d'Honneur, Knight of the Order of Pius IX, the Order of the Red Eagle, Order of Saints Maurice and Lazarus, Knight of the Order of Leopold (Belgium), Order of Leopold (Austria), Grand Cross of the Order of the Immaculate Conception of Vila Viçosa, the Order of the Rose, Grand Cross of the Order of St. Olav, the Grand Cross of the Order of the Zähringer Lion, the Order of the Lion and the Sun, Order of Burma, Knight of Honour of the Sovereign Military Order of Malta and Order of St. Charles, among others.

== Works ==
- Sin Nombre (1868), Recopilación de artículos literarios.
- Reseña analítica de las obras póstumas del memorable dramaturgo, reformador de nuestro teatro (1868)
- Le Jury Criminel en Espagne (Montpellier, 1884)
- Obras completas de Moratín, con notas y comentarios (Madrid, 1890)
- El bautizo de un libro
- El perfecto novelista
- Un verano de Felipe V
- Recuerdos de Extremadura
- Revista cantábrica (1869)
- Salir de Madrid (1851)
- La Alcarria
- Mañanas de La Granja
- Revista del Escorial
- Variaciones fáciles
- Sobre el conocido tema "El amor y el matrimonio"
- Un viaje por regiones desconocidas
- De la influencia de las construcciones modernas en la literatura
- De Madrid a Sevilla y Cádiz
- Literatura infinitesimal
- El abogado de pobres
- Revista de La Granja
- Cuatro capítulos de una novela inédita
- Desde Madrid a Toledo (1854)
- El castillo de <<aunque os pese>>
- Una Dalia y un puntapié
- La Opera y el Gobierno (1865)
- Apuntes críticos acerca de las poesías de Baeza, y por incidencia de las condiciones literarias del siglo
- El diccionario y la gastronomía
- Miscelánea
- La prensa ilustrada
- Un ukase
- Revista de la exposición de Bellas Artes (1868)
- Juicio crítico de la Restauración en 1881
- Los dineros del sacristán
- Al amor de la lumbre
- Negro y blanco (1851)
- La via sacra
- Recuerdos de Spa
- Disertación acerca de la influencia ejercida en el idioma y en el teatro español por la escuela clásica que floreció desde los comienzos del S.XVIII
- Un talego del Estado o el estado de un talego
- Sobre el diccionario de la Real Academia Española
- Fin de una polémica
- Ultimas palabras sobre una polémica
- En las aguas de Spa (1887)
- ¡Viva Galicia!

== Sources ==
- Spanish Senate. Personal dossier of D. Manuel Silvela

Political offices
Preceded by Juan Álvarez de Lorenzana	Minister of State; 18 June 1869 – 1 November 1869	Succeeded by Cristino Martos
