= Mauricio Carlos de Onís y Mercklein =

Spanish politician and diplomat

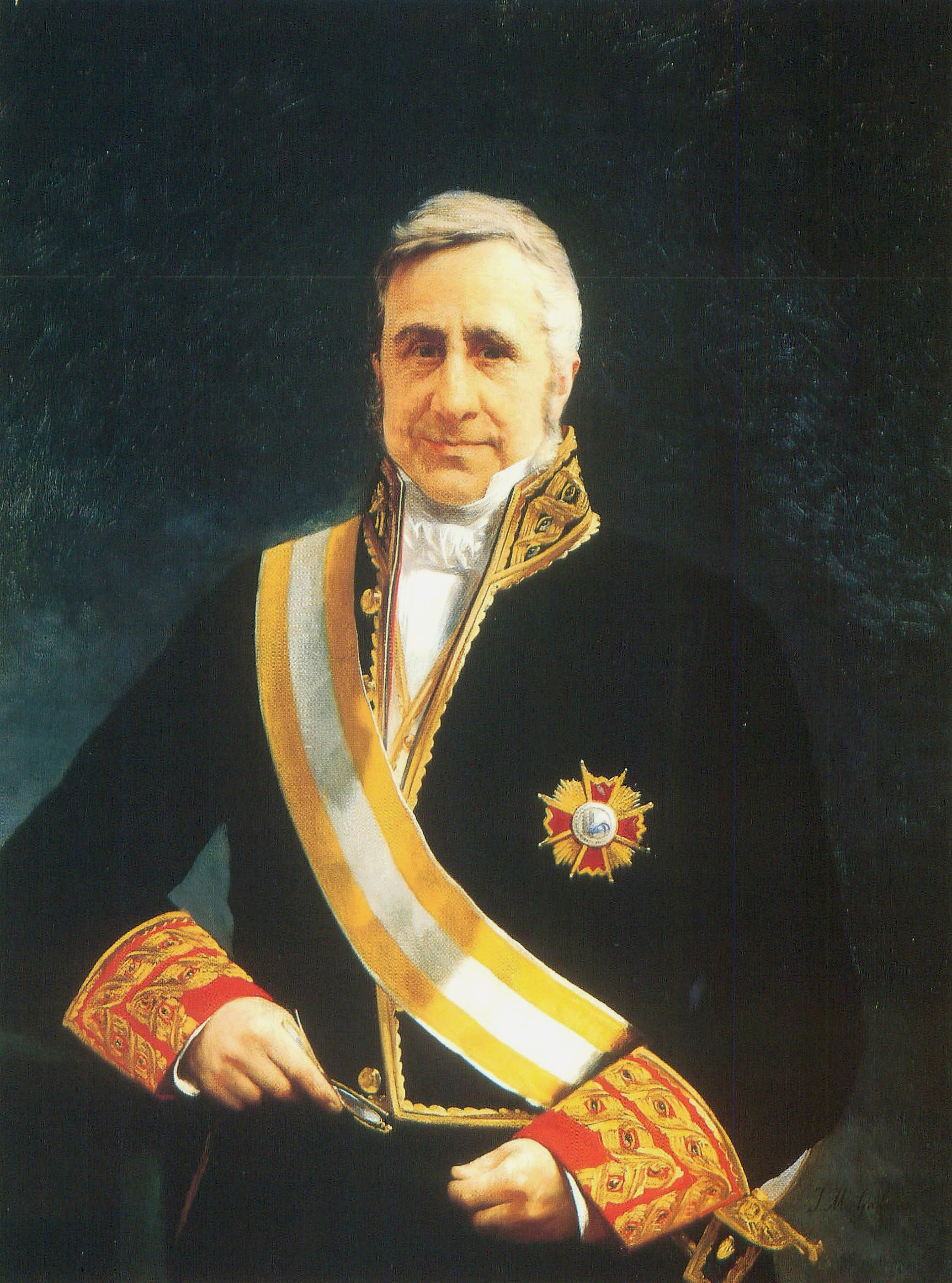
Mauricio Carlos de Onís

Mauricio Carlos de Onís y Mercklein (17 September 1790, in Dresden, Kingdom of Saxony – 24 November 1861, in Cantalapiedra, Spain) was a Spanish politician and diplomat who served as Minister of State in 1840 and as President of the Congress of Deputies.

Mauricio was son of Luis de Onís y González-Vara, an important diplomat who signed the Adams-Onís Treaty with the United States in 1819, and of Federika Christina von Mercklein. He married in Cantalapiedra, 11 December 1816, his first cousin Carolina de Onís, and had issue.

Political offices
Preceded by José del Castillo; Acting	Minister of State; 20 July 1840 – 29 August 1840	Succeeded by Juan Antoine
