= Fernando Calderón de la Barca, 1st Marquis of Reinosa =

Spanish noble & politician (1811–1890)

The Marquis of Reinosa

Don Fernando Calderón de la Barca y Collantes, 1st Marquis of Reinosa (21 February 1811, in Reinosa, Spain – 9 January 1890, in Madrid, Spain) was a Spanish noble and politician who served as Minister of State between 1875 and 1877.

Second son of Manuel Santiago Calderón de la Barca y Rodríguez-Fontecha, Senator for Cantabria, and his wife Saturnina Collantes y Fonegra. His eldest brother Saturnino Calderón de la Barca y Collantes, also a prominent politician who held important offices.

Political offices
Preceded by The Count of Casa Valencia	Minister of State; 29 November 1875–14 January 1877	Succeeded by Francisco Silvela
