= Francisco de Borja Queipo de Llano, 8th Count of Toreno =

Spanish noble and politician

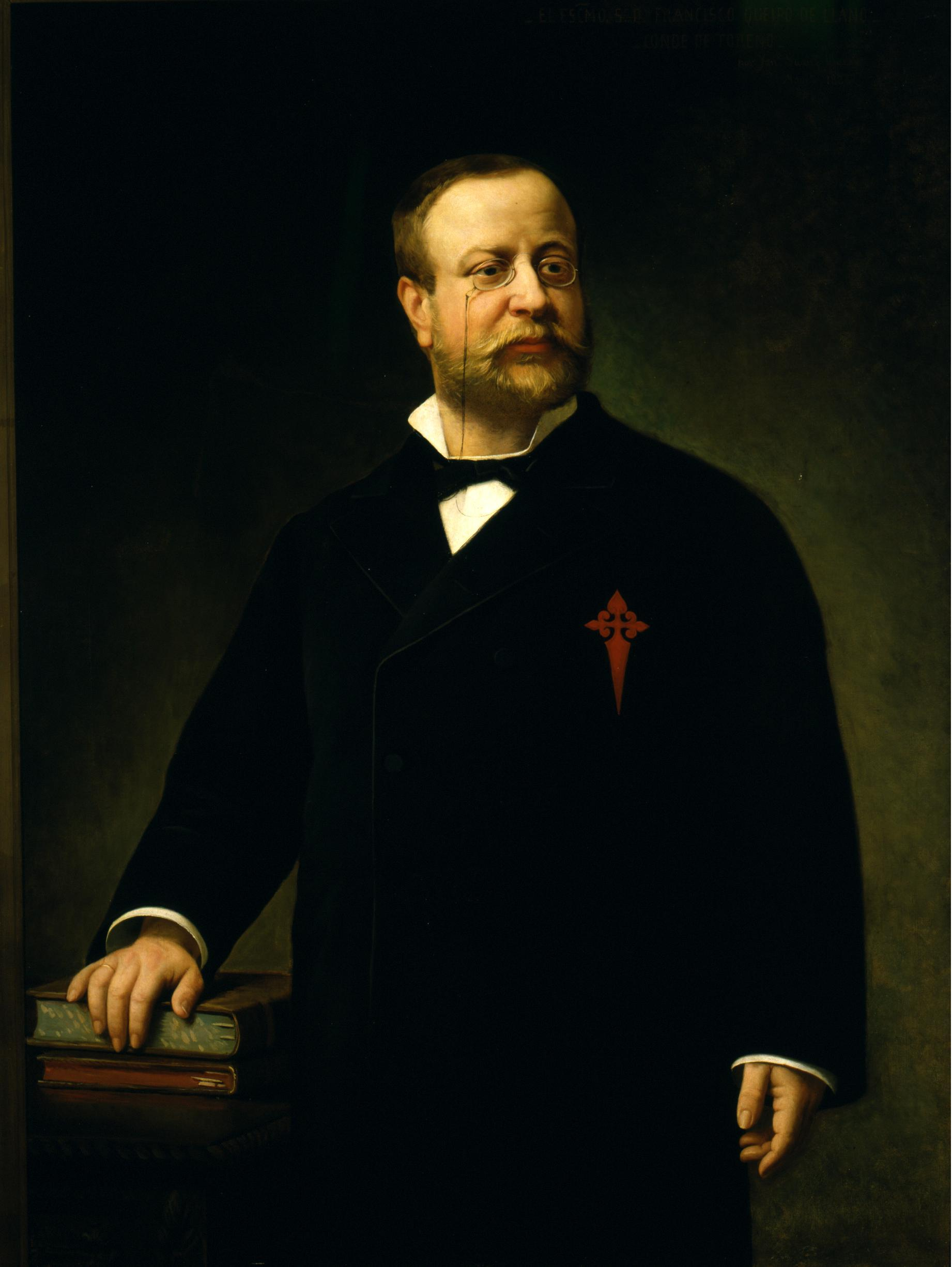
The Count of Toreno.

H.E. Don Francisco de Borja Queipo de Llano y Gayoso de los Cobos, Grandee of Spain, 8th Count of Toreno and 8th Viscount of Matarrosa (6 November 1840 – 31 January 1890) was a Spanish noble and politician. He served as Minister of State between 1875 and 1879, and was also appointed Mayor of Madrid. His father was President of Spain and his great-grandmother was the Princess of Anglona of the Borja family. He is named after his ancestor Francisco de Borja y Aragon, great-grandson of both Pope Alexander VI and King Ferdinand II of Aragon. His descendants are also the Count of Toreno, Marquess of Guadiaro, Count of Casares, Count of Belalcazar, Countess of San Martín de Quiroga, Viscount of Valoria, Duke of Monteagudo, Count of Mayorga, Count of San Martín de Quiroga, and Viscount of Matarrosa.

== Life ==
Born at Madrid, he was educated at the Madrid Institute and University, entered parliament in 1864 as a Moderado, and sat in all the Cortes of Queen Isabella's reign as a deputy for his ancestral province, Asturias. Loyal to the Bourbons all through the revolution, he nevertheless became a deputy in the Cortes of 1871–1873, and founded an Alphonsist paper, El Tiempo, in 1873.

When the Restoration took place, its first cabinet made Count de Toreno mayor of the capital and, in 1875, minister of public works, in which capacity he improved the public libraries, museums, academies and archives, and caused many important works to be published, including the Cartas de Indias.

In 1879 he became minister for foreign affairs, in 1880 president of the House of Deputies, in 1884 again governor of Madrid, and in 1885 again president of the House of Deputies. During the reign of Alphonso XII and the first years of the regency of Queen Christina, Count de Toreno was one of the most prominent Conservative leaders and was often consulted by the Crown. He died on 31 January 1890.

Political offices
| Preceded by Francisco Silvela | Minister of State; Acting; 7 March 1879 – 10 March 1879 | Succeeded by The Marquis of Molíns |
| Preceded by The Duke of Tetuan | Minister of State; 9 December 1879 – 20 January 1880 | Succeeded by Antonio Cánovas del Castillo; Acting |
