= Manuel Bertrán de Lis y Ribes =

Spanish politician (1806–1869)

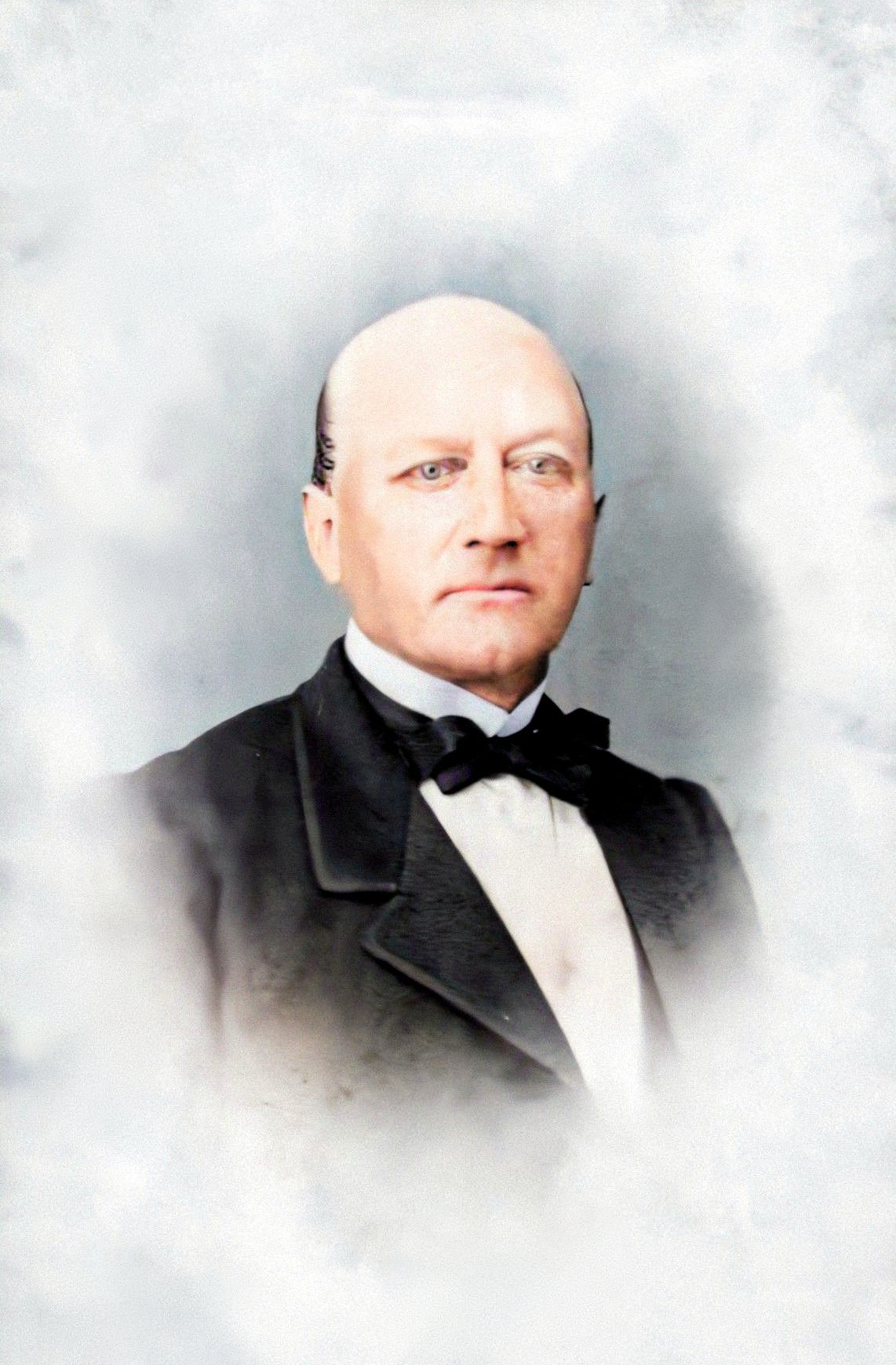
Manuel Bertrán de Lis

Manuel Bertrán de Lis y Ribes (28 February 1806, in Valencia, Spain – 29 July 1869, in Segovia, Spain) was a Spanish politician who served twice as Minister of State, between 1851 and 1852. Other minister positions he held included the Navy, Treasury, and of the State.

He was also a member of the Congress of Deputies from the 1840s to the 1860s representing Toledo, Valencia, and the Canary Islands.

Political offices
Preceded by The Marquis of Pidal	Minister of State; 14 January 1851 – 23 May 1851	Succeeded by The Marquis of Miraflores
Preceded by The Marquis of Miraflores	Minister of State; 7 August 1852 – 14 December 1852	Succeeded by The Count of Alcoy
