= José Malcampo, 3rd Marquis of San Rafael =

Spanish noble, admiral and politician

The Most Excellent The Marquis of San Rafael
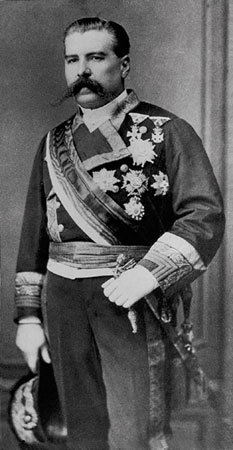

Prime Minister of Spain
- In office 5 October 1871 – 21 December 1871
- Monarch: Amadeo I
- Preceded by: Manuel Ruiz Zorrilla
- Succeeded by: Práxedes Mateo Sagasta

Personal details
- Born: José Malcampo y Monge; 13 January 1828 San Fernando, Province of Cádiz, Andalusia, Spain
- Died: 23 May 1880 (aged 52) Sanlúcar de Barrameda, Province of Cádiz, Andalusia, Spain

Don José Malcampo y Monge, 3rd Marquis of San Rafael (13 January 1828 – 23 May 1880) was a Spanish noble, admiral and politician who participated in the Revolution of 1868 as a seaman and served as Prime Minister of Spain in 1871, during the reign of King Amadeo I.

Malcampo was born in San Fernando, Cádiz. In the course of his career, he held other important military and political offices such as Minister of State in 1871, President of the Council of State and Captain and Governor General of the Philippines from 1874 to 1877, in the reign of King Alfonso XII. During his governorship, the city of Jolo was taken from the Sultanate of Sulu, and the Marquess was granted the titles of Count of Jolo and Viscount of Mindanao as victory titles. He founded the first Masonic Lodge in Cavite. It was called La Primer Luz Filipina. He died at Sanlúcar de Barrameda.

Political offices
Preceded by Manuel Ruiz Zorrilla	Prime Minister of Spain; 5 October 1871 – 21 December 1871	Succeeded by Práxedes Mateo Sagasta
Preceded by The Marquis of Mendigorría as Acting Minister of State	Minister of State (Acting); 5 October 1871 – 20 November 1871	Succeeded by Bonifacio de Blas
Government offices
Preceded by Manuel Blanco Valderrama as Acting Governor-General of the Philippines	Governor-General of the Philippines; 18 June 1874 – 28 February 1877	Succeeded by Domingo Moriones y Murillo
