= Nicolás María Rivero =

Spanish politician

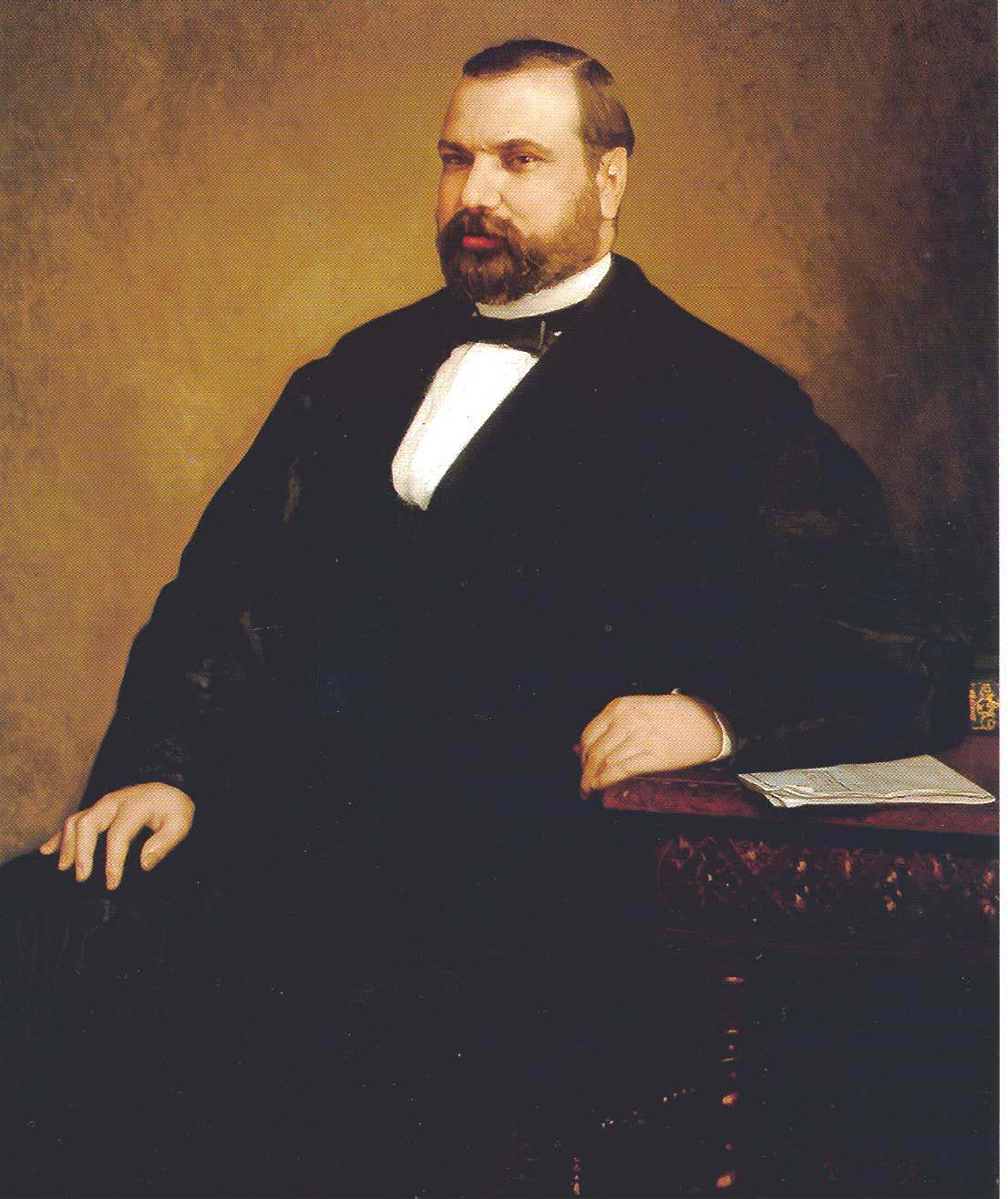

Personal details
- Born: December 6, 1814 Móron de la Frontera, Seville
- Died: December 5, 1878 (aged 64) Madrid

Blas Nicolás María Rivero (1814–1878) was a Spanish politician and leader of the Spanish Democratic Party. He was the Deputy Mayor of Madrid, and later the Interior Minister of Spain.
