= Francisco Serrano, 1st Duke of la Torre =

Spanish marshal and statesman

The Most Excellent Francisco Serrano 1st Duke of la Torre GE
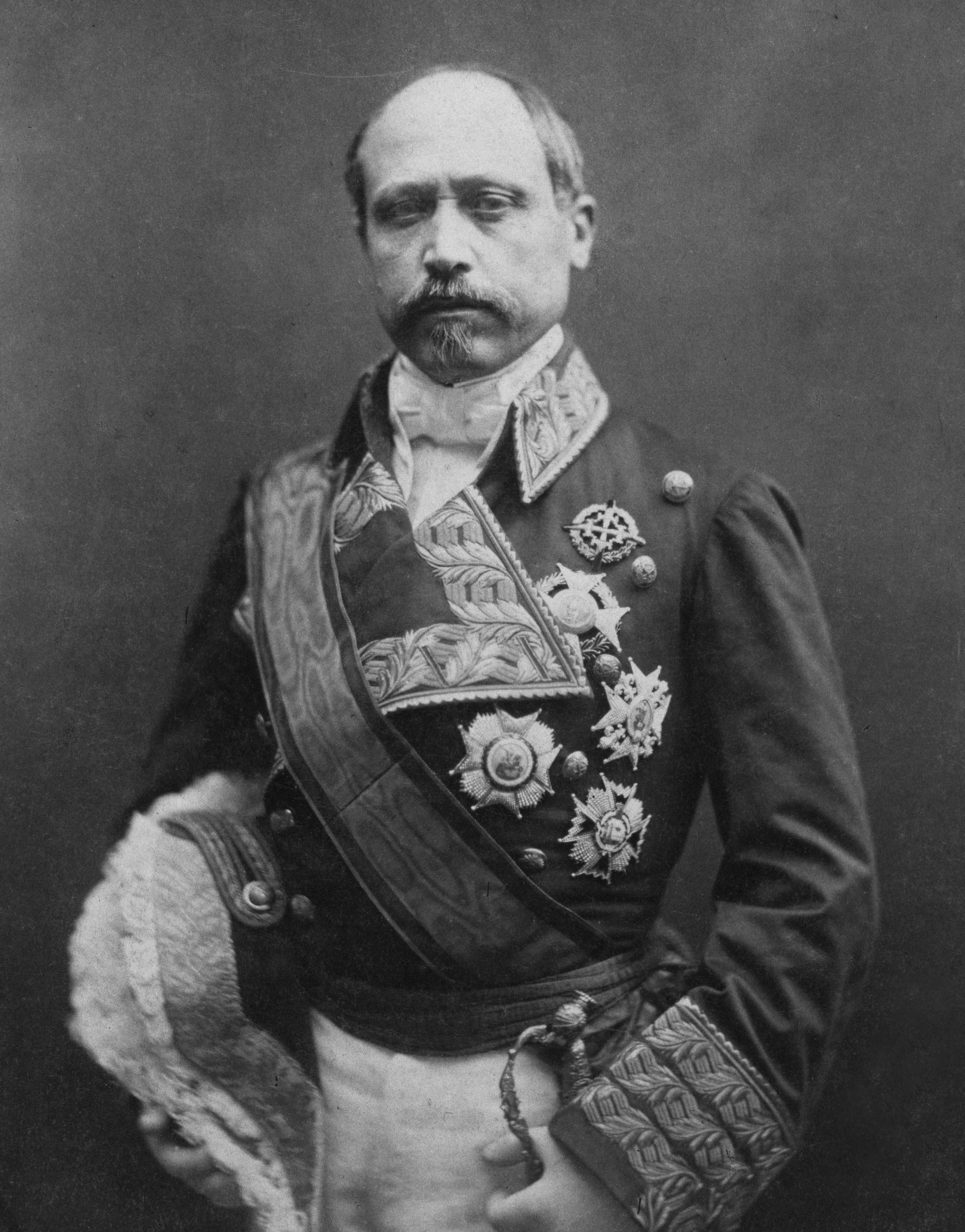
- Portrait by Nadar

Regent of Spain
- In office 18 June 1869 – 2 January 1871
- Preceded by: Isabella II of Spain (as Queen)
- Succeeded by: Amadeo I of Spain (as King)

President of the Executive Power of the Republic
- In office 3 January 1874 – 29 December 1874
- Prime Minister: Himself; Juan de Zavala; Práxedes Mateo Sagasta
- Preceded by: Emilio Castelar
- Succeeded by: Alfonso XII (as King)

Prime Minister of Spain
- In office 3 January 1874 – 26 February 1874
- President: Himself
- Preceded by: Emilio Castelar
- Succeeded by: Juan de Zavala
- In office 26 May 1872 – 13 June 1872
- Monarch: Amadeo I
- Preceded by: Práxedes Mateo Sagasta
- Succeeded by: Manuel Ruiz Zorrilla
- In office 4 January 1871 – 24 July 1871
- Monarch: Amadeo I
- Preceded by: Juan Bautista Topete (interim)
- Succeeded by: Manuel Ruiz Zorrilla
- In office 3 October 1868 – 18 June 1869
- Monarch: Amadeo I
- Preceded by: José Gutiérrez de la Concha
- Succeeded by: Juan Prim

President of the Senate of Spain
- In office 12 December 1865 – 30 December 1866
- Monarch: Isabella II
- Preceded by: Marquis of the Duero
- Succeeded by: Marquess of Miraflores
- In office 12 December 1883 – 31 March 1884
- Monarch: Alfonso XII
- Preceded by: José Gutiérrez de la Concha
- Succeeded by: Count of Puñonrrostro

Minister of State of Spain
- In office 17 January – 2 March 1863
- Monarch: Isabella II
- Prime Minister: Leopoldo O'Donnell
- Preceded by: Saturnino Calderón Collantes
- Succeeded by: Marquess of Miraflores

Minister of War of Spain
- In office 9 May – 19 May 1843
- Monarch: Isabella II
- Regent: Baldomero Espartero
- Prime Minister: Joaquín María López
- Preceded by: José Ramón Rodil
- Succeeded by: Isidoro Rubín de Celis
- In office 30 July – 1 December 1843
- Monarch: Isabella II
- Prime Minister: Joaquín María López; Salustiano Olózaga
- Preceded by: Agustín Nogueras
- Succeeded by: Manuel Mazarredo
- Interim
- In office 4 January – 24 July 1871
- Monarch: Amadeo I
- Prime Minister: Himself
- Preceded by: Juan Bautista Topete (interim)
- Succeeded by: Fernando Fernández de Córdova (interim)
- In office 26 May – 13 June 1872
- Monarch: Amadeo I
- Prime Minister: Himself
- Preceded by: Juan de Zavala
- Succeeded by: Fernando Fernández de Córdova

Governor of Cuba
- In office 24 November 1859 – 10 December 1862
- Monarch: Isabella II
- Prime Minister: Leopoldo O'Donnell
- Minister of Overseas: Leopoldo O'Donnell
- Preceded by: José Gutiérrez de la Concha
- Succeeded by: Domingo Dulce

Personal details
- Born: 17 December 1810 Isla de León, Spain
- Died: 25 November 1885 (aged 74) Madrid, Spain
- Spouse: Antonia Domínguez, 2nd Countess of San Antonio (1850–1885)

Francisco Serrano Domínguez, 1st Duke of la Torre, Grandee of Spain, Count of San Antonio (17 December 1810 – 25 November 1885) was a Spanish marshal and statesman. He was Prime Minister of Spain four times between 1868 and 1874, regent in 1869–71, and the last President of the short-lived First Spanish Republic in 1874.

== Early life and education ==
Serrano was born on 17 December 1810 in the Isla de León (current day San Fernando), in the Bay of Cádiz. He was son of Francisco Serrano y Cuenca and Isabel Domínguez de Guevara Vasconcelos. His father, born in Lopera, parish of Purísima Concepción, was a general officer and a Liberal. His mother was born in Marbella circa 1780.

Serrano began his studies at Vergara in the Basque provinces.

== Military career ==
Following his father into the military, he became a cadet in 1822 in the Sagunto regiment, cornet in 1833 in the lancers of Sagunto, and passed into the carabiniers in 1829. When the Carlist agitation began in 1833, he transferred into the cuirassiers. He formed part of the escort that accompanied Don Carlos, the first pretender and brother of Ferdinand VII, to the frontier of Portugal.

As aide-de-camp of Espoz y Mina, then under the orders of generals Córdova and Espartero, in the armies of Queen Isabella II, Serrano took such an active part in the First Carlist War from 1834 to 1839, that he rose from the rank of captain to that of brigadier-general. He was awarded the Cross of San Fernando and many medals. He was also granted the 155th Grand Cross of the Order of the Tower and Sword.

In 1839, he was elected as a member of Cortes for the first time for Málaga. In 1840 he was promoted to the rank of general of division and commander of the district of Valencia, which he relinquished to take his seat in congress.

== Political career ==
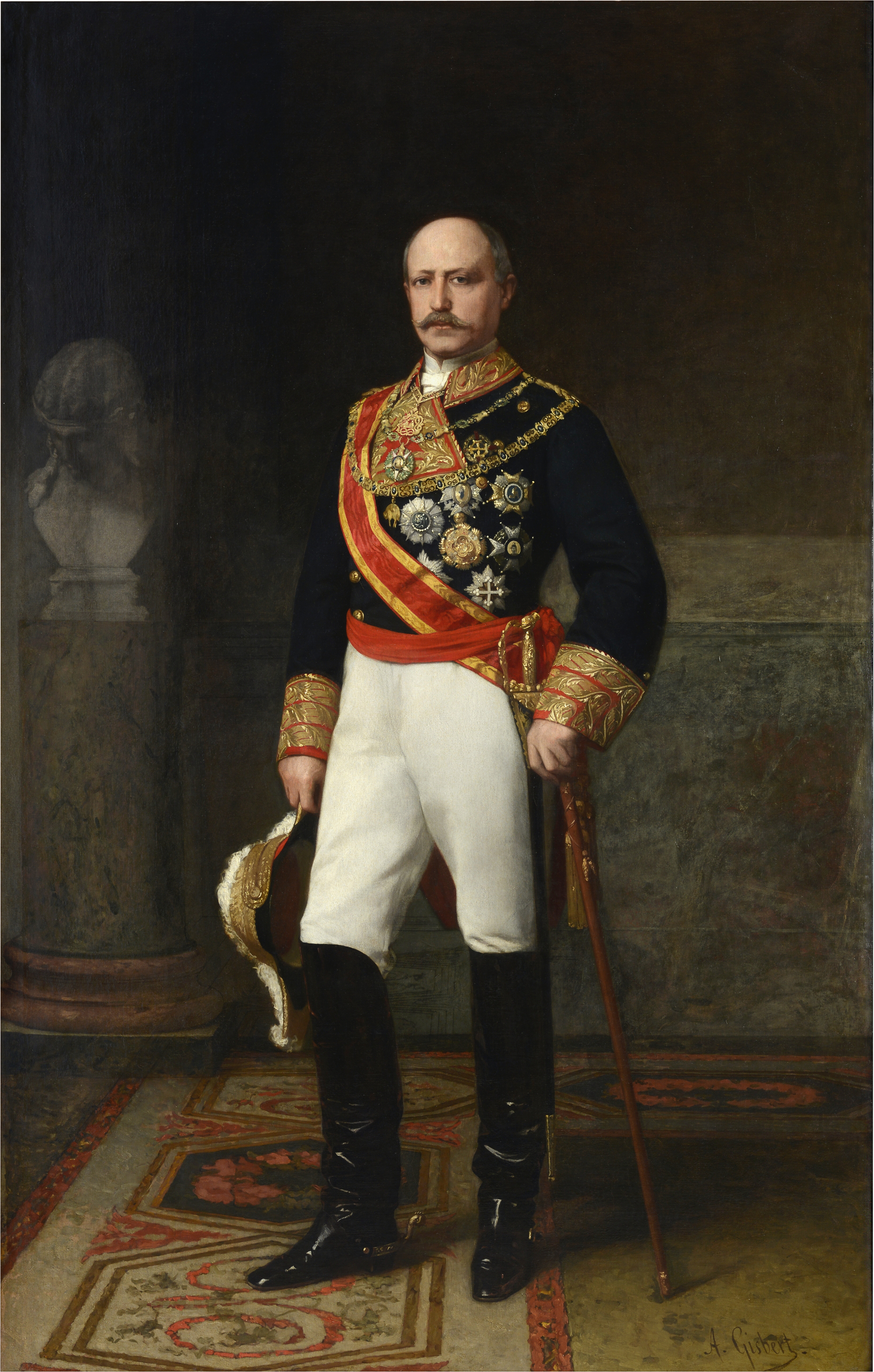
Portrait by Antonio Gisbert.

From that day Serrano became one of the chief military politicians of Spain. In 1841, he helped Espartero to overthrow the regency of Maria Christina of Bourbon-Sicily. In 1843, at Barcelona he made a pronunciamiento against Espartero. He was appointed as the minister of war in the cabinet of Joaquín María López y López, which convoked the Cortes that declared Queen Isabella of age at thirteen. He served in the same capacity in an Olozaga cabinet, sulked as long as the Moderates (Moderados) were in office.

In 1845, he was appointed as a senator, and in 1848 as captain-general of Granada. From 1846 to 1853, he was away from politics, living on his Andalusian estates or traveling abroad.

On 29 September 1850 in Madrid, Serrano married his first cousin, Antonia Domínguez y Borrell, Guevara y Lemus, 2nd Countess of San Antonio, (Note: Born in Havana, baptized on 19 March 1831. Died in Biarritz, 7 January 1917. Daughter of his maternal uncle Miguel Domínguez y Guevara-Vasconcellos, Pérez de Vargas y Alburquerque (1789–1858), 1st Count of San Antonio, and María Isabel Borrell y Lemus, Padrón y de la Cruz-Jiménez (1809–1877).) with whom he had five children.

Serrano assisted Marshal Leopoldo O'Donnell in the military movements of 1854 and 1856, and was his staunch follower for twelve years.

=== Captain-General of Cuba ===
O'Donnell appointed Serrano as marshal in 1856 and captain-general of Cuba from 1859 to 1862. Serrano governed that island with success, and helped carry out the war in Santo Domingo. He was the first viceroy to advocate political and financial reforms in the colony.

=== Return to the Peninsula ===
On his return to Peninsular Spain, O'Donnell made him Duke of la Torre (Duque de la Torre), Grandee of Spain of the first class, and the 139th Minister of Foreign Affairs, serving from 18 January to 2 March 1863. Serrano risked his life in helping O'Donnell quell the insurrection of 22 June 1866 at Madrid. He was awarded with the Order of the Golden Fleece.

After the death of O'Donnell, Serrano became the leader of the Liberal Union Party. As president of the senate, he assisted Ríos Rosas to draw up a petition to Queen Isabella against her Moderate ministers, for which both were exiled.

=== The Glorious Revolution ===
Serrano began to conspire with Antoine, Duke of Montpensier, Prim and Sagasta. On 7 July 1868, González Bravo had Serrano and other generals arrested and taken to the Canary Islands. There Serrano remained until Admiral Topete sent a steamer to bring him to Cadiz on 18 September that same year.

On landing he signed the manifesto of the revolution with Prim, Topete, Sagasta, Martos and others, and accepted the command of the revolutionary army. He routed the troops of Queen Isabella under the orders of the Marquess of Novaliches at the bridge of Alcolea. The queen fled to France, and Serrano, having entered Madrid, formed a Provisional Government.

=== 1868–1871 Provisional Government ===
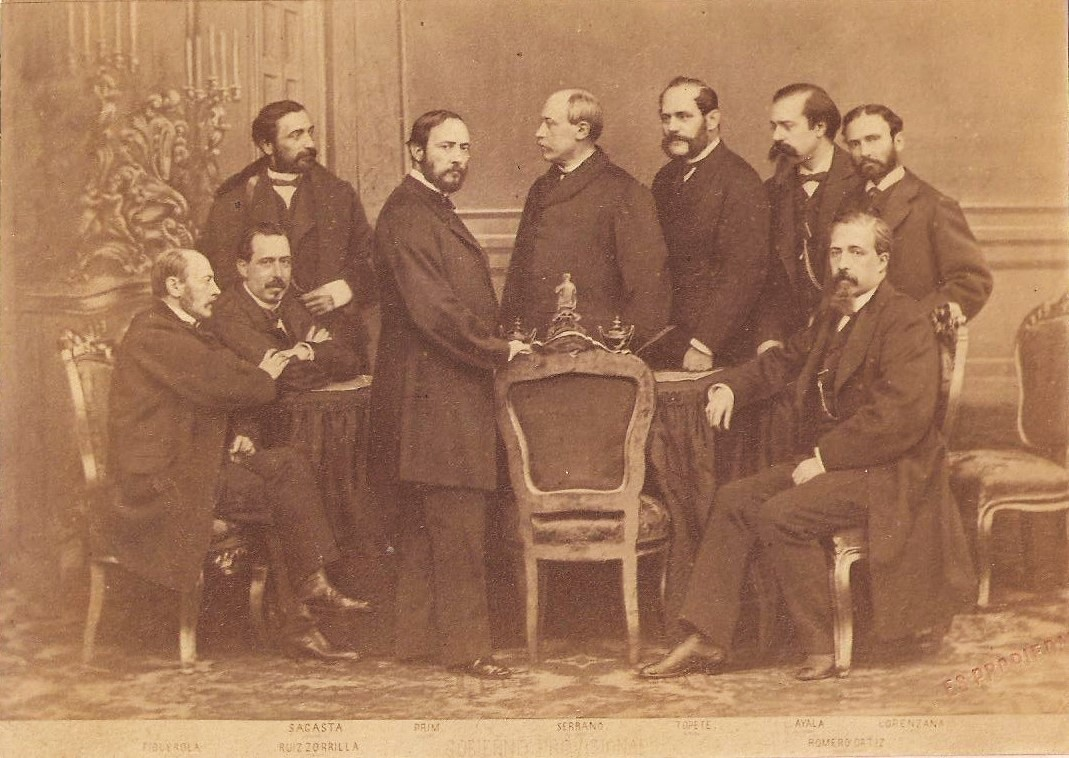
Serrano (center) among the members of the Provisional Government in 1869, by J. Laurent.

In February 1869, he convoked the Cortes Constituyentes; he was appointed successively as president of the executive, Prime Minister of Spain, and Regent from 3 October 1868 to 18 June 1869. Serrano ruled impartially, respecting the independence of the Cortes and cabinets. He acceded to their selection of Amadeus I of Savoy as king, although he would have preferred Montpensier.

As soon as Amadeus reached Madrid, after the death of Prim, Serrano consented to form a coalition cabinet, which lasted only a few months. Serrano resigned and took the command of the Italian king's army against the Carlists in northern Spain. He tried to form one more cabinet under King Amadeus as the 65th Prime Minister of Spain on 6 June 1872, but resigned on 12 June when that monarch declined to give his ministers dictatorial powers and sent for Ruiz Zorrilla. His mistakes led to Amadeus abdicating the throne on 11 February 1873.

=== Conspirations against the Republic ===
Serrano opposed the federal republic, and conspired with other generals and politicians to overthrow it on 23 April 1873. Having failed, he went into exile in France. On the eve of his coup d'état of 3 January 1874 that sought to thwart the Federal Republic, the leading instigator, the General Manuel Pavía, sent for Serrano to take the leadership.

The Duke of la Torre's coat of arms

=== Dictatorship of Serrano ===
Serrano again took the title of president of the executive; he tried to form a coalition cabinet, but Cristino Martos and Sagasta soon quarrelled. His next cabinet was presided over by Sagasta. The military and political unrest continued, and at the end of December 1874, the Bourbons were restored by another pronunciamiento.

During the eleven months he remained in office, Serrano devoted his attention chiefly to the reorganization of finance, the renewal of relations with American and European powers, and the suppression of revolt.

=== Later life ===
After Alfonso XII ascended the throne in 1875, Serrano spent some time in France. He returned to Madrid in 1876, attended palace receptions, took his seat as a marshal in the senate, and flirted politically with Sagasta and his party in 1881. He finally gave his support to the formation of a dynastic Left with a democratic program defended by his nephew, General José López Domínguez.

He died in Madrid on 25 November/26 November 1885, twenty-four hours after Alfonso XII.

== Bibliography ==
- Borrego, Andrés (1892). Historia de la vida militar y política de don Francisco Serrano y Domínguez. Madrid: Juan Iglesia Sánchez.

Political offices
Preceded by Saturnino Calderón de la Barca	Minister of State; 17 January 1863 – 2 March 1863	Succeeded by The Marquis of Miraflores
Preceded by Pascual Madoz	Prime Minister of Spain; 3 October 1868 – 18 June 1869	Succeeded by The Marquis of los Castillejos
Vacant Title last held by The Duke of la Victoria	Regent of Spain; 18 June 1869 – 2 January 1871	Vacant Title next held by Maria Christina of Austria
Preceded by Isabella II as Queen of Spain	Head of State of Spain as Regent; 18 June 1869 – 2 January 1871	Succeeded by Amadeo as King of Spain
Preceded by Juan Bautista Topete	Prime Minister of Spain; 4 January 1871 – 24 July 1871	Succeeded by Manuel Ruiz Zorrilla
Preceded by Juan Bautista Topete	Prime Minister of Spain; 4 June 1872 – 13 June 1872	Succeeded by The Marquis of Mendigorría
Preceded by Emilio Castelar	President of the Executive Power of Spain; 3 January 1874 – 30 December 1874	Office abolished Monarchy restored in 1874
Preceded by Emilio Castelar	Head of State of Spain as President of the Executive Power; 3 January 1874 – 30 December 1874	Succeeded by Alfonso XII as King of Spain
Preceded by Emilio Castelar	President of the Provisional Government of Spain; 4 January 1874 – 26 February 1874	Succeeded by The Marquis of Sierra Bullones
Government offices
Preceded by The Marquis of Havana	Captain General of Cuba; 24 November 1859 – 3 December 1862	Succeeded by The Marquis of Castell-Florite
Diplomatic posts
Preceded by Salustiano de Olózaga	Spanish Ambassador to France; 11 January 1856 – 2 June 1856	Succeeded by Salustiano de Olózaga
Spanish nobility
New creation	Duke of la Torre; 24 November 1862 – 26 November 1885	Succeeded by Francisco Serrano
