= Práxedes Mateo Sagasta =

Spanish politician (1825–1903)

The Most Excellent Práxedes Mateo Sagasta
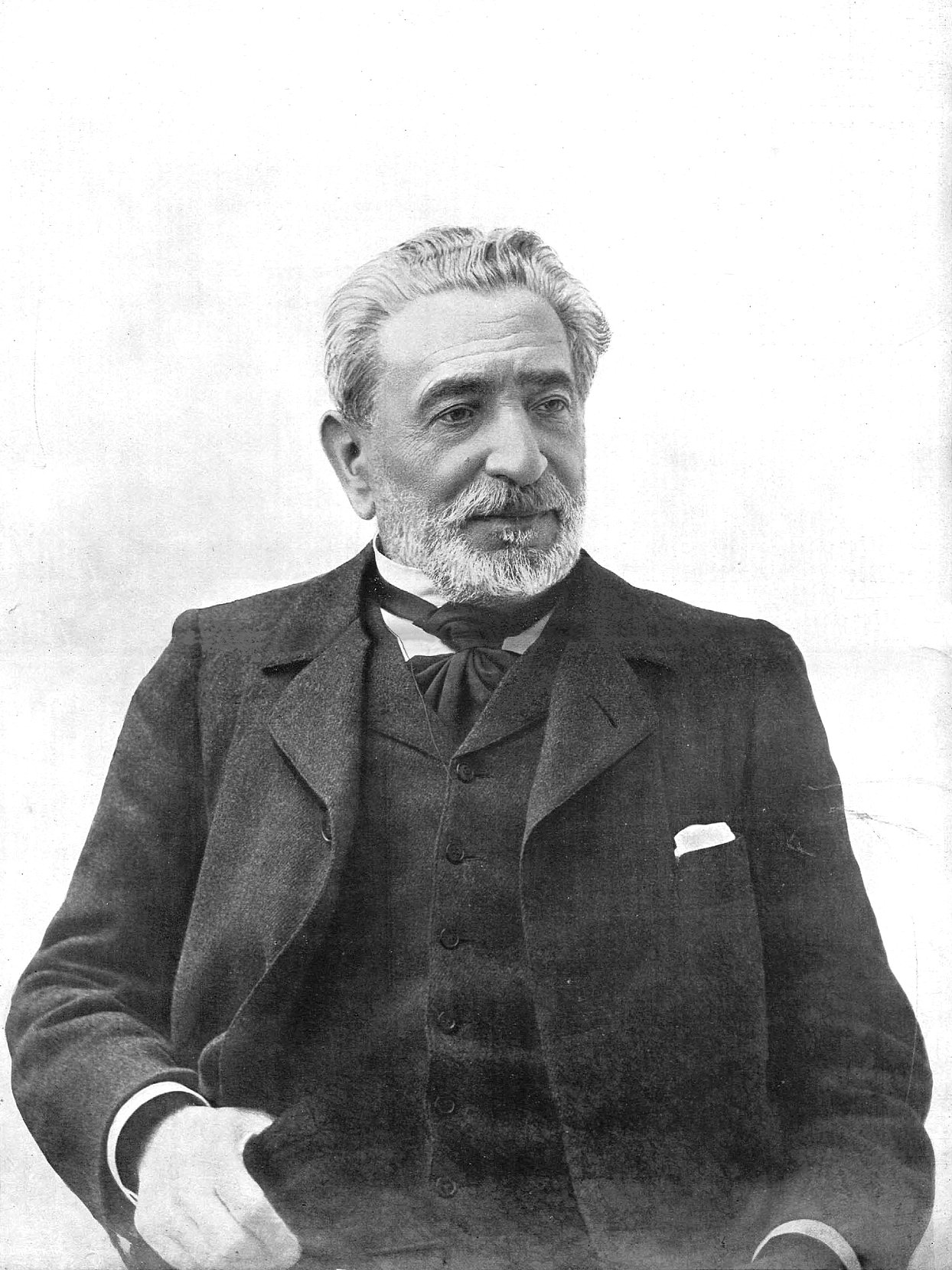
- Photograph by Christian Franzen

Prime Minister of Spain
- In office 7 March 1901 – 10 December 1902
- Monarch: Alfonso XIII
- Preceded by: Marcelo Azcárraga
- Succeeded by: Francisco Silvela
- In office 5 October 1897 – 7 March 1899
- Monarch: Alfonso XIII
- Preceded by: Marcelo Azcárraga
- Succeeded by: Francisco Silvela
- In office 13 December 1892 – 24 March 1895
- Monarch: Alfonso XIII
- Preceded by: Antonio Cánovas del Castillo
- Succeeded by: Antonio Cánovas del Castillo
- In office 28 November 1885 – 8 July 1890
- Monarch: Alfonso XIII (born 17 May 1886)
- Regent: Maria Christina of Austria
- Preceded by: Antonio Cánovas del Castillo
- Succeeded by: Antonio Cánovas del Castillo
- In office 10 February 1881 – 14 October 1883
- Monarch: Alfonso XII
- Preceded by: Antonio Cánovas del Castillo
- Succeeded by: José Posada Herrera
- In office 29 June 1874 – 31 December 1874
- President: Francisco Serrano
- Preceded by: Juan de Zavala
- Succeeded by: Antonio Cánovas del Castillo
- In office 21 December 1871 – 26 May 1872
- Monarch: Amadeo I
- Preceded by: The Marquess of San Rafael
- Succeeded by: Francisco Serrano

Minister of Governance of Spain
- In office 8 October 1868 – 9 January 1870
- Regent: Francisco Serrano
- Prime Minister: Francisco Serrano; Juan Prim
- Preceded by: Luis González Bravo
- Succeeded by: Nicolás María Rivero
- In office 25 December 1870 – 24 July 1871
- Monarch: Amadeo I
- Regent: Francisco Serrano
- Prime Minister: Juan Prim; Juan Bautista Topete; Francisco Serrano
- Preceded by: Nicolás María Rivero
- Succeeded by: Manuel Ruiz Zorrilla

Personal details
- Born: 21 July 1825 Torrecilla en Cameros, Logroño, Spain
- Died: 5 January 1903 (aged 77) Madrid, Spain
- Resting place: Pantheon of Illustrious Men
- Party: Progressive; Liberal Party

Práxedes Mariano Mateo Sagasta y Escolar (21 July 1825 – 5 January 1903) was a Spanish civil engineer and politician who served as Prime Minister on eight occasions between 1870 and 1902—always in charge of the Liberal Party—as part of the turno pacifico, alternating with the Conservative leader Antonio Cánovas. He was known as an excellent orator.

== Biography ==
Mateo Sagasta was born on 21 July 1825 at Torrecilla en Cameros, province of Logroño, Spain. As a member of the Progressive Party while a student at the Civil Engineering School of Madrid in 1848, Sagasta was the only one in the school who refused to sign a letter supporting Isabella II.

After his studies, he took an active role in government. Sagasta served in the Spanish Cortes between 1854–1857 and 1858–1863. In 1866 he went into exile in France after a failed coup. After the Spanish Revolution of 1868, he returned to Spain to take part in the newly created provisional government.

In 1880, Sagasta founded the Liberal Fusionist Party, which in 1881 formed a government lasting until 1883. During this administration, the government enacted a law guaranteeing freedom of the press without prior censorship and granted a general amnesty to Republicans. In 1885, the Liberal Fusionists merged with the Izquierda Dinástica ("Dynastic Left") to create the Liberal Party.

During Sagasta’s premiership from 1885 to 1890, his government implemented a series of major reforms, including the abolition of slavery in Cuba in 1886, the Law of Associations in 1887, the promulgation of a new Civil Code in 1889, and the introduction of universal male suffrage in 1890.

He served as Prime Minister of Spain during the Spanish–American War of 1898 when Spain lost its remaining colonies. Mateo Sagasta agreed to an autonomous constitution for both Cuba and Puerto Rico. Mateo Sagasta's political opponents saw his action as a betrayal of Spain and blamed him for the country's defeat in the war and the loss of its island territories in the Treaty of Paris of 1898. He continued to be active in politics for another four years.

Mateo Sagasta's ministry lost a vote in the Cortes on 2 December 1902, he handed in his resignation to the King on the following day, and formally resigned on 10 December 1902.

Mateo Sagasta died in Madrid at the age of 77 on 5 January 1903, just a month after his last resignation.

== See also ==
- Regency of Maria Christina of Austria
- Reign of Alfonso XIII

Political offices
Preceded by Luis González Bravo	Minister of Government; 1868-1870	Succeeded by Nicolás María Rivero
Preceded by Juan de Zavala y de la Puente	Prime Minister of Spain; 1874	Succeeded by Antonio Cánovas del Castillo
Preceded by Antonio Cánovas del Castillo	Prime Minister of Spain; 1881-1883	Succeeded by José Posada Herrera
Preceded by Antonio Cánovas del Castillo	Prime Minister of Spain; 1885-1890	Succeeded by Antonio Cánovas del Castillo
Preceded by Antonio Cánovas del Castillo	Prime Minister of Spain; 1892-1895	Succeeded by Antonio Cánovas del Castillo
Preceded by Marcelo Azcárraga	Prime Minister of Spain; 1897-1899	Succeeded by Francisco Silvela
Preceded by Marcelo Azcárraga	Prime Minister of Spain; 1901-1902	Succeeded by Francisco Silvela
Party political offices
Preceded by Party created	Leader of the Liberal Party; 1876–1902	Succeeded by Eugenio Montero Ríos
