= List of interior ministers of Spain =

This is a list of the Spanish ministers of the interior since the early eighteenth century, when the government department was first established. For most of history, the position was known as minister or secretary of the governance, although it is currently known as minister of the interior, a title also used in the past.

Names throughout history:

- Secretary of State and of the Office of the Governance of the Kingdom for the Peninsula and Adjacent Islands (1812–1814; 1820–1823) & Secretary of State and of the Office of the Governance of the Kingdom for Overseas (1812–1814; 1820–1823)
- Secretary of State and of the Office of the Interior (1823; 1834–1835)
- Secretary of State and of the Office of General Development of the Kingdom (1832–1834)
- Secretary of State and of the Office of the Governance (1835–19th century)
- Minister of the Governance (19th century–1977)
- Minister of the Interior (1977–1994)
- Minister of Justice and Interior (1994–1996)
- Minister of the Interior (1996–)

== Reign of Ferdinand VII (1808–1833) ==
=== Peninsular War (1808–1814) ===
Name	Term	Prime Minister	Name	Term	Prime Minister	Ref.
Reign of Joseph Bonaparte
Minister of the Interior			Minister of General Police			
The Count of Cabarrús (1752–1810) acting minister	20 August 1808 – 15 November 1808 (87 days)	Mariano Luis de Urquijo	Pablo Antonio Arribas (Note: Due to the absence of the officeholder, The Duke of Santa Fe served as acting minister from 27 August 1811 to 21 January 1812) (1771–1828)	20 August 1808 – 27 June 1813 (4 years, 311 days)	Mariano Luis de Urquijo	
Manuel Romero Echalecu (1739–1813)	15 November 1808 – 21 December 1809 (1 year, 36 days)	Mariano Luis de Urquijo	Pablo Antonio Arribas (1771–1828)	20 August 1808 – 27 June 1813 (4 years, 311 days)	Mariano Luis de Urquijo	
José Martínez de Hervás (Note: Due to the absence of the officeholder, the following persons served as acting ministers: The Count of Cabarrús (7 January 1810 – 13 May 1810), Francisco Angulo (7 August 1810 – 10 December 1810) and Manuel Romero (27 July 1811 – 27 August 1811).) (1760–1830)	21 December 1809 – 27 June 1813 (3 years, 188 days)	Mariano Luis de Urquijo	Pablo Antonio Arribas (1771–1828)	20 August 1808 – 27 June 1813 (4 years, 311 days)	Mariano Luis de Urquijo	
Supreme Central Junta — Regency in the name of Ferdinand VII; Abdication of Ferdinand VII declared null and void by the Council of Castile on August 11, 1808 and recognition of him as king on August 24 of the same year.
Secretary of the Governance of the Peninsula			Secretary of the Governance of Overseas			
José García de León y Pizarro (1770–1835)	23 June 1812 – 14 January 1813 (205 days)	The Marquess of Casa Irujo	Tomás González Calderón (Note: Due to the absence of the officeholder, the following persons served as acting ministers: Ciriaco González Carvajal (23 June 1812 – 23 October 1812) and Manuel de la Bodega Mollinedo (23 October 1812 – 5 August 1813).) (1740–1814)	23 June 1812 – 5 August 1813 (1 year, 43 days)	The Marquess of Casa Irujo	
José García de León y Pizarro (1770–1835)	23 June 1812 – 14 January 1813 (205 days)	The Marquess of Labrador	Tomás González Calderón (1740–1814)	23 June 1812 – 5 August 1813 (1 year, 43 days)	The Marquess of Labrador	
The Marquess of Labrador (1764–1850) acting minister	14 January 1813 – 30 March 1813 (75 days)	The Marquess of Labrador	Tomás González Calderón (1740–1814)	23 June 1812 – 5 August 1813 (1 year, 43 days)	The Marquess of Labrador	
Juan Álvarez Guerra (1770–1845)	30 March 1813 – 4 May 1814 (1 year, 35 days)	The Marquess of Labrador	Manuel de la Bodega Mollinedo (1753–1835) acting minister	5 August 1813 – 4 May 1814 (272 days)	The Marquess of Labrador	
Abolition of the Constitution of 1812

=== Trienio Liberal (1820–1823) & final years (1832–1833) ===
Name	Start	End	Duration	Government		Ref.
José García de la Torre (1774–1847) acting minister	10 March 1820	22 March 1820	12 days	Evaristo Pérez de Castro	Ferdinand VII (1808–1833)	
Jacobo María de Parga y Puga (1774–1850) acting minister	22 March 1820	3 April 1820	12 days	Evaristo Pérez de Castro	Ferdinand VII (1808–1833)	
Agustín Argüelles (Note: Due to the absence of the officeholder, Antonio Porcel Román served as acting minister (3 April 1820 – 13 June 1820).) (1776–1844)	3 April 1820	2 March 1821	333 days	Evaristo Pérez de Castro	Ferdinand VII (1808–1833)	
Joaquín Baeza acting minister	2 March 1821	4 March 1821	2 days	Evaristo Pérez de Castro	Ferdinand VII (1808–1833)	
Mateo Valdemoros (Note: He was barely able to hold the position due to an illness, being replaced in his duties by Ramón Feliú since March 5.) (1771–1821)	4 March 1821	4 May 1821	61 days	Eusebio Bardají y Azara	Ferdinand VII (1808–1833)	
Ramón Olaguer Feliú (1787–1862)	4 May 1821	8 January 1822	249 days	Eusebio Bardají y Azara	Ferdinand VII (1808–1833)	
Vicente Cano Manuel Ramírez de Arellano (1774–1838) acting minister	8 January 1822	11 January 1822	3 days	Ramón López-Pelegrín	Ferdinand VII (1808–1833)	
Francisco Javier Pinilla Pérez (1759–?) acting minister	11 January 1822	28 February 1822	48 days	Ramón López-Pelegrín	Ferdinand VII (1808–1833)	
Francisco Javier Pinilla Pérez (1759–?) acting minister	11 January 1822	28 February 1822	48 days	The Marquess of Santa Cruz	Ferdinand VII (1808–1833)	
The Count of Fontao (1788–1854)	28 February 1822	7 July 1822	129 days	Francisco Martínez de la Rosa	Ferdinand VII (1808–1833)	
Joaquín Fondevilla acting minister	7 July 1822	8 July 1822	1 day	Francisco Martínez de la Rosa	Ferdinand VII (1808–1833)	
Diego Clemencín y Viñas (1765–1834) acting minister	8 July 1822	10 July 1822	2 days	Francisco Martínez de la Rosa	Ferdinand VII (1808–1833)	
José María Calatrava (1781–1846) acting minister	10 July 1822	5 August 1822	26 days	Francisco Martínez de la Rosa	Ferdinand VII (1808–1833)	
José Fernández Gascó (1768–1826)	5 August 1822	24 April 1823	262 days	The Duke of San Miguel	Ferdinand VII (1808–1833)	
José María Calatrava (1781–1846)	24 April 1823	18 May 1823	24 days	José Manuel de Vadillo	Ferdinand VII (1808–1833)	
José María Calatrava (1781–1846)	24 April 1823	18 May 1823	24 days	José María Pando	Ferdinand VII (1808–1833)	
Manuel García Herreros (1767–1836)	18 May 1823	2 June 1823	15 days	José María Pando	Ferdinand VII (1808–1833)	
Salvador Manzanares (1788–1831)	2 June 1823	30 September 1823	120 days	The Marquess of La Constancia	Ferdinand VII (1808–1833)	
Salvador Manzanares (1788–1831)	2 June 1823	30 September 1823	120 days	Víctor Damián Sáez	Ferdinand VII (1808–1833)	
Office disestablished during this interval.
Victoriano de Encima (1766–1840) acting minister	5 November 1832	28 December 1832	53 days	Francisco Cea Bermúdez	Ferdinand VII (1808–1833)	
The Marquess of Heredia (1775–1843)	28 December 1832	21 October 1833	297 days	Francisco Cea Bermúdez	Ferdinand VII (1808–1833)	
The Marquess of Heredia (1775–1843)	28 December 1832	21 October 1833	297 days	Francisco Cea Bermúdez	Isabella II (1833–1868)	

== Reign of Isabella II (1833–1868) & Regency of Serrano (1868–1871) ==
Name	Start	End	Duration	Party	Government		Ref.
Javier de Burgos (1778–1848)	21 October 1833	17 April 1834	178 days	Moderate	Francisco Cea Bermúdez	Isabella II (1833–1868)	
Javier de Burgos (1778–1848)	21 October 1833	17 April 1834	178 days	Moderate	Francisco Martínez de la Rosa	Isabella II (1833–1868)	
The Count of Fontao (Note: Nicolás María Garelli served as acting minister until May 4, when The Count assumed the position.) (1788–1854)	17 April 1834	17 February 1835	306 days	Moderate	Francisco Martínez de la Rosa	Isabella II (1833–1868)	
Diego de Medrano y Treviño (1784–1853) acting minister	17 February 1835	13 June 1835	116 days	Moderate	Francisco Martínez de la Rosa	Isabella II (1833–1868)	
Juan Álvarez Guerra (1770–1845)	13 June 1835	28 August 1835	76 days	Moderate	The Count of Toreno	Isabella II (1833–1868)	
Manuel de la Riva (1785–1844)	28 August 1835	14 September 1835	17 days	Progressive	Miguel Ricardo de Álava	Isabella II (1833–1868)	
Martín de los Heros (Note: On 14 September 1835, Ramón Gil de la Cuadra was appointed Minister of the Interior, however he did not accept the position and Martín de los Heros acted in acting basis until September 27, when he was ratified in the position.) (1784–1859)	15 September 1835	15 May 1836	243 days	Progressive	Juan Álvarez Mendizábal	Isabella II (1833–1868)	
The Duke of Rivas (1791–1865)	15 May 1836	14 August 1836	91 days	Moderate	Francisco Javier de Istúriz	Isabella II (1833–1868)	
Ramón Gil de la Cuadra (1775–1860)	14 August 1836	11 September 1836	28 days	Progressive	José María Calatrava	Isabella II (1833–1868)	
Joaquín María López y López (Note: Due to a minor illness, between January 23 and February 1, 1837, Agustín Armendáriz y Murillo served as acting minister.) (1798–1855)	11 September 1836	27 March 1837	197 days	Progressive	José María Calatrava	Isabella II (1833–1868)	
Pío Pita Pizarro (1792–1845)	27 March 1837	9 July 1837	104 days	Progressive	José María Calatrava	Isabella II (1833–1868)	
Pedro Antonio Acuña y Cuadros (1792–1845)	9 July 1837	18 August 1837	40 days	Progressive	José María Calatrava	Isabella II (1833–1868)	
José Manuel Vadillo (Note: He did not accept the position.) (1773–1858)	18 August 1837	23 August 1837	5 days	Progressive	The Prince of Vergara	Isabella II (1833–1868)	
Diego González Alonso (1779–1841)	23 August 1837	1 October 1837	39 days	Progressive	The Prince of Vergara	Isabella II (1833–1868)	
Diego González Alonso (1779–1841)	23 August 1837	1 October 1837	39 days	Progressive	Eusebio Bardají y Azara	Isabella II (1833–1868)	
Rafael Pérez (1798–1854)	1 October 1837	26 November 1837	56 days	Progressive	Eusebio Bardají y Azara	Isabella II (1833–1868)	
Francisco Javier Ulloa (1777–1855)	26 November 1837	16 December 1837	20 days	Progressive	Eusebio Bardají y Azara	Isabella II (1833–1868)	
The Marquess of Someruelos (1797–1859)	16 December 1837	6 September 1838	264 days	Moderate	The Marquess of Heredia	Isabella II (1833–1868)	
The Marquess of Vallgornera (1786–1864)	6 September 1838	6 December 1838	91 days	Moderate	The Duke of Frías	Isabella II (1833–1868)	
Francisco Agustín Silvela y Blanco (1803–1857)	6 December 1838	9 December 1838	3 days	Moderate	The Duke of Frías	Isabella II (1833–1868)	
Antonio Hompanera de Cos (c. 1810–1855)	9 December 1838	10 May 1839	152 days	Moderate	Evaristo Pérez de Castro	Isabella II (1833–1868)	
Lorenzo Arrazola (1795–1873) acting minister	10 May 1839	18 May 1839	8 days	Moderate	Evaristo Pérez de Castro	Isabella II (1833–1868)	
Juan Martín Carramolino (1805–1881)	18 May 1839	21 October 1839	156 days	Moderate	Evaristo Pérez de Castro	Isabella II (1833–1868)	
Lorenzo Arrazola (1795–1873) acting minister	21 October 1839	16 November 1839	26 days	Moderate	Evaristo Pérez de Castro	Isabella II (1833–1868)	
Saturnino Calderón Collantes (1799–1864)	16 November 1839	8 April 1840	144 days	Moderate	Evaristo Pérez de Castro	Isabella II (1833–1868)	
The Marquess of Armendáriz (1786–1875)	8 April 1840	20 July 1840	103 days	Moderate	Evaristo Pérez de Castro	Isabella II (1833–1868)	
Vicente Sancho y Cobertores (1784–1860)	20 July 1840	12 August 1840	23 days	Progressive	The Marquess of Valdeterrazo	Isabella II (1833–1868)	
Francisco Cabello Rubio (1802–1851)	12 August 1840	19 August 1840	7 days	Progressive	Valentín Ferraz y Barrau	Isabella II (1833–1868)	
José María Secades del Rivero (1785–1868) acting minister	19 August 1840	29 August 1840	10 days	Progressive	Valentín Ferraz y Barrau	Isabella II (1833–1868)	
Fermín de Arteta y Sesma (1796–1880)	29 August 1840	11 September 1840	13 days	Progressive	Modesto Cortázar y Leal de Ibarra	Isabella II (1833–1868)	
Francisco Cabello Rubio (1802–1851)	11 September 1840	16 September 1840	5 days	Progressive	Vicente Sancho y Cobertores	Isabella II (1833–1868)	
Manuel Cortina (1802–1879)	3 October 1840	21 May 1841	230 days	Progressive	The Prince of Vergara	Isabella II (1833–1868)	
Manuel Cortina (1802–1879)	3 October 1840	21 May 1841	230 days	Progressive	Joaquín María Ferrer y Cafranga	Isabella II (1833–1868)	
Facundo Infante (Note: José Alonso Ruiz de Conejares served as acting minister until 25 November 1841, when Infante assumed the office.) (1786–1873)	21 May 1841	17 June 1842	1 year, 27 days	Progressive	The Marquess of Valdeterrazo	Isabella II (1833–1868)	
Mariano Torres Solanot (1791–1858)	17 June 1842	9 May 1843	326 days	Progressive	The Marquess of Rodil	Isabella II (1833–1868)	
Fermín Caballero (1800–1876)	9 May 1843	19 May 1843	10 days	Progressive	Joaquín María López y López	Isabella II (1833–1868)	
Pedro Gómez de la Serna (1806–1871)	19 May 1843	24 July 1843	66 days	Progressive	Álvaro Gómez Becerra	Isabella II (1833–1868)	
Fermín Caballero (1800–1876)	24 July 1843	24 November 1843	123 days	Progressive	Joaquín María López y López	Isabella II (1833–1868)	
Fermín Caballero (1800–1876)	24 July 1843	24 November 1843	123 days	Progressive	Salustiano de Olózaga y Almandoz	Isabella II (1833–1868)	
Jacinto Félix Domenech (1802–1863)	24 November 1843	1 December 1843	130 days	Progressive	Salustiano de Olózaga y Almandoz	Isabella II (1833–1868)	
The Marquess of Peñaflorida (1800–1853)	5 December 1843	3 May 1844	150 days	Moderate	Luis González Bravo	Isabella II (1833–1868)	
The Marquess of Pidal (1799–1865)	3 May 1844	12 February 1846	1 year, 285 days	Moderate	The Duke of Valencia	Isabella II (1833–1868)	
The Marquess of Miraflores (1790–1872) acting minister	12 February 1846	13 February 1846	1 day	Moderate	The Marquess of Miraflores	Isabella II (1833–1868)	
Francisco Javier de Istúriz (1785–1871)	13 February 1846	16 March 1846	31 days	Moderate	The Marquess of Miraflores	Isabella II (1833–1868)	
Javier de Burgos (1778–1848)	16 March 1846	5 April 1846	20 days	Moderate	The Duke of Valencia	Isabella II (1833–1868)	
Juan Felipe Martínez Almagro (1799–1859) acting minister	5 April 1846	12 April 1846	7 days	Moderate	Francisco Javier de Istúriz	Isabella II (1833–1868)	
The Marquess of Pidal (1799–1865)	12 April 1846	28 January 1847	291 days	Moderate	Francisco Javier de Istúriz	Isabella II (1833–1868)	
Manuel Seijas Lozano (1800–1868)	28 January 1847	28 March 1847	59 days	Moderate	The Marquess of Casa Irujo	Isabella II (1833–1868)	
Antonio de Benavides y Fernández de Navarrete (1807–1884)	28 March 1847	31 August 1847	156 days	Moderate	Joaquín Francisco Pacheco	Isabella II (1833–1868)	
Patricio de la Escosura (1807–1878)	31 August 1847	4 October 1847	34 days	Moderate	Florencio García Goyena	Isabella II (1833–1868)	
The Count of San Luis (Note: The Marquess of Molins served as acting minister from August 31 to September 25, 1848.) (1820–1871)	4 October 1847	19 October 1849	2 years, 15 days	Moderate	The Duke of Valencia	Isabella II (1833–1868)	
Trinidad Balboa (1789–1853)	19 October 1849	20 October 1849	1 day	Moderate	The Count of Clonard	Isabella II (1833–1868)	
The Count of San Luis (Note: Manuel Seijas Lozano served as acting minister from September 19 to October 8, 1850.) (1820–1871)	20 October 1849	14 January 1851	1 year, 86 days	Moderate	The Duke of Valencia	Isabella II (1833–1868)	
Fermín de Arteta y Sesma (1796–1880)	14 January 1851	5 April 1851	81 days	Moderate	Juan Bravo Murillo	Isabella II (1833–1868)	
Manuel Bertrán de Lis y Ribes (1806–1869)	5 April 1851	7 August 1852	1 year, 124 days	Moderate	Juan Bravo Murillo	Isabella II (1833–1868)	
Melchor Ordóñez (1811–1860)	7 August 1852	15 November 1852	100 days	Moderate	Juan Bravo Murillo	Isabella II (1833–1868)	
Cristóbal Bordiú y Góngora (1798–1872)	15 November 1852	14 December 1852	29 days	Moderate	Juan Bravo Murillo	Isabella II (1833–1868)	
Alejandro Llorente y Lannas (1814–1901)	14 December 1852	10 January 1853	27 days	Moderate	The Count of Alcoy	Isabella II (1833–1868)	
Antonio de Benavides y Fernández de Navarrete (1807–1884)	10 January 1853	14 April 1853	94 days	Moderate	The Count of Alcoy	Isabella II (1833–1868)	
Pedro de Egaña (1803–1885)	14 April 1853	19 September 1853	158 days	Moderate	Francisco de Lersundi y Hormaechea	Isabella II (1833–1868)	
The Count of San Luis (1820–1871)	19 September 1853	17 July 1854	301 days	Moderate	The Count of San Luis	Isabella II (1833–1868)	
Antonio de los Ríos y Rosas (1812–1873)	18 July 1854	30 July 1854	12 days	Moderate	The Duke of Rivas	Isabella II (1833–1868)	
Antonio de los Ríos y Rosas (1812–1873)	18 July 1854	30 July 1854	12 days	Moderate	The Prince of Vergara	Isabella II (1833–1868)	
Francisco Santa Cruz Pacheco (1797–1883)	30 July 1854	6 June 1855	311 days	Progressive	The Prince of Vergara	Isabella II (1833–1868)	
Julián de Huelves (1804–1865)	6 June 1855	15 January 1856	223 days	Progressive	The Prince of Vergara	Isabella II (1833–1868)	
Patricio de la Escosura (Note: Francisco de Luján Miguel-Romero, minister of development, served as acting minister from June 25 to July 9, 1856.) (1807–1878)	15 January 1856	14 July 1856	181 days	Progressive	The Prince of Vergara	Isabella II (1833–1868)	
Antonio de los Ríos y Rosas (1812–1873)	14 July 1856	12 October 1856	90 days	Liberal Unionist	The Duke of Tetuán	Isabella II (1833–1868)	
Cándido Nocedal (1821–1885)	12 October 1856	15 October 1857	1 year, 3 days	Moderate	The Duke of Valencia	Isabella II (1833–1868)	
The Marquess of Nervión (1804–1866) acting minister	15 October 1857	25 October 1857	10 days	Moderate	The Marquess of Nervión	Isabella II (1833–1868)	
Manuel Bermúdez de Castro y Díez (1811–1870)	25 October 1857	14 January 1858	81 days	Moderate	The Marquess of Nervión	Isabella II (1833–1868)	
Ventura Díaz Astillero de los Ríos (1808–1864)	14 January 1858	5 May 1858	111 days	Moderate	Francisco Javier de Istúriz	Isabella II (1833–1868)	
José Fernández de la Hoz (1812–1887) acting minister	5 May 1858	14 May 1858	9 days	Moderate	Francisco Javier de Istúriz	Isabella II (1833–1868)	
José Posada Herrera (Note: During his absences, Saturnino Calderón Collantes (6 July 1860 – 1 August 1860 and 21 August 1861 – 26 September 1861) and The Marquess of Vega de Armijo (10 July 1862 – 13 August 1862), served as interim ministers.) (1814–1885)	14 May 1858	17 January 1863	4 years, 248 days	Moderate	Francisco Javier de Istúriz	Isabella II (1833–1868)	
José Posada Herrera (1814–1885)	14 May 1858	17 January 1863	4 years, 248 days	Moderate	The Duke of Tetuán	Isabella II (1833–1868)	
José Posada Herrera (1814–1885)	14 May 1858	17 January 1863	4 years, 248 days	Liberal Unionist	The Duke of Tetuán	Isabella II (1833–1868)	
The Marquess of Vega de Armijo (1808–1864)	17 January 1863	2 March 1863	44 days	Liberal Unionist	The Duke of Tetuán	Isabella II (1833–1868)	
Florencio Rodríguez Vaamonde (Note: During his absence, The Marquess of Miraflores, prime minister and minister of state, served as acting minister of the interior from June 13 to July 2, 1863.) (1807–1886)	2 March 1863	17 January 1864	321 days	Moderate	The Marquess of Miraflores	Isabella II (1833–1868)	
Antonio de Benavides y Fernández de Navarrete (1807–1884)	17 January 1864	1 March 1864	44 days	Moderate	Lorenzo Arrazola	Isabella II (1833–1868)	
Antonio Cánovas del Castillo (Note: During his absence, Alejandro Mon y Menéndez served as acting minister from August 13 to September 2, 1864.) (1828–1897)	1 March 1864	16 September 1864	199 days	Moderate	Alejandro Mon y Menéndez	Isabella II (1833–1868)	
Luis González Bravo (1811–1871)	16 September 1864	21 June 1865	278 days	Moderate	The Duke of Valencia	Isabella II (1833–1868)	
José Posada Herrera (1814–1885)	21 June 1865	10 July 1866	1 year, 19 days	Liberal Unionist	The Duke of Tetuán	Isabella II (1833–1868)	
Luis González Bravo (1811–1871)	10 July 1866	20 September 1868	2 years, 72 days	Moderate	The Duke of Valencia	Isabella II (1833–1868)	
Luis González Bravo (1811–1871)	10 July 1866	20 September 1868	2 years, 72 days	Moderate	Luis González Bravo	Isabella II (1833–1868)	
José Nacario Bravo (1817–?) acting minister	20 September 1868	8 October 1868	18 days	Independent	The Marquess of Havana	Isabella II (1833–1868)	
José Nacario Bravo (1817–?) acting minister	20 September 1868	8 October 1868	18 days	Independent	The Duke of the Tower	The Duke of the Tower (regent) (1868–1871)	
Práxedes Mateo Sagasta (Note: During his absence, Manuel Ruiz Zorrilla served as acting minister from April 17 to May 13, 1869.) (1825–1903)	8 October 1868	9 January 1870	1 year, 93 days	Liberal Unionist	The Duke of the Tower	The Duke of the Tower (regent) (1868–1871)	
Práxedes Mateo Sagasta (1825–1903)	8 October 1868	9 January 1870	1 year, 93 days	Progressive	The Marquess of Castillejos	The Duke of the Tower (regent) (1868–1871)	
Nicolás María Rivero (1814–1878)	9 January 1870	25 December 1870	350 days	Progressive	The Marquess of Castillejos	The Duke of the Tower (regent) (1868–1871)	
Práxedes Mateo Sagasta (1825–1903)	25 December 1870	4 January 1871	10 days	Progressive	Juan Bautista Topete	The Duke of the Tower (regent) (1868–1871)	

== Reign of Amadeo I (1871–1873) and First Republic (1874–1875) ==
Name	Term		Duration	Party	Government		Ref.
Práxedes Mateo Sagasta (1825–1903)	4 January 1871	24 July 1871	201 days	Progressive	The Duke of the Tower	Amadeo I (1871–1873)	
Manuel Ruiz Zorrilla (1833–1895)	24 July 1871	5 October 1871	73 days	Radical-Democrat	Manuel Ruiz Zorrilla	Amadeo I (1871–1873)	
Francisco de Paula Candau (1823–1883)	5 October 1871	21 December 1871	77 days	Constitutionalist	The Marquess of San Rafael	Amadeo I (1871–1873)	
Práxedes Mateo Sagasta (1825–1903)	21 December 1871	26 May 1872	157 days	Constitutionalist	The Marquess of San Rafael	Amadeo I (1871–1873)	
Práxedes Mateo Sagasta (1825–1903)	21 December 1871	26 May 1872	157 days	Constitutionalist	Práxedes Mateo Sagasta	Amadeo I (1871–1873)	
Francisco de Paula Candau (1823–1883)	26 May 1872	13 June 1872	18 days	Constitutionalist	The Duke of the Tower	Amadeo I (1871–1873)	
Manuel Ruiz Zorrilla (Note: Cristino Martos y Balbí served as acting minister until June 16, 1872.) (1833–1895)	13 June 1872	12 February 1873	244 days	Radical-Democrat	Manuel Ruiz Zorrilla	Amadeo I (1871–1873)	
Francesc Pi i Margall (1824–1901)	12 February 1873	18 July 1873	156 days	Federal Republican	Estanislao Figueras	List of presidents of the First Republic	
Francesc Pi i Margall (1824–1901)	12 February 1873	18 July 1873	156 days	Federal Republican	Francisco Pi y Margall	List of presidents of the First Republic	
Eleuterio Maisonnave y Cutayar (Note: José Carvajal Hué served in interim basis from September 25 to September 30, 1873.) (1840–1890)	19 July 1873	3 January 1874	168 days	Federal Republican	Nicolás Salmerón	List of presidents of the First Republic	
Eleuterio Maisonnave y Cutayar (1840–1890)	19 July 1873	3 January 1874	168 days	Federal Republican	Emilio Castelar	List of presidents of the First Republic	
Eugenio García Ruiz (1818–1883)	3 January 1874	13 May 1874	130 days	Constitutionalist	The Duke of the Tower	List of presidents of the First Republic	
Práxedes Mateo Sagasta (1825–1903)	13 May 1874	31 December 1874	232 days	Constitutionalist	The Marquess of Sierra Bullones	List of presidents of the First Republic	
Práxedes Mateo Sagasta (1825–1903)	13 May 1874	31 December 1874	232 days	Constitutionalist	Práxedes Mateo Sagasta	List of presidents of the First Republic	

== First Bourbon Restoration (1875–1931) ==
Name	Term		Duration	Party	Government		Ref.
Francisco Romero Robledo (Note: The Count of Toreno served twice in interim basis: from 16 August to 8 September 1876 and from 8 September to 11 October 1878.) (1838–1906)	31 December 1874	7 March 1879	4 years, 66 days	Conservative	Antonio Cánovas del Castillo	Alfonso XII (1874–1885)	
Francisco Romero Robledo (1838–1906)	31 December 1874	7 March 1879	4 years, 66 days	Conservative	Joaquín Jovellar y Soler	Alfonso XII (1874–1885)	
Francisco Romero Robledo (1838–1906)	31 December 1874	7 March 1879	4 years, 66 days	Conservative	Antonio Cánovas del Castillo	Alfonso XII (1874–1885)	
Francisco Silvela (Note: The Count of Toreno served as acting minister from September 1 to September 16, 1879.) (1843–1905)	7 March 1879	9 December 1879	277 days	Conservative	Arsenio Martínez Campos	Alfonso XII (1874–1885)	
Francisco Romero Robledo (Note: Antonio Cánovas del Castillo (19 March 1880 – 7 April 1880) and Fermín Lasala y Collado (25 October 1880 – 28 November 1880) served as acting ministers.) (1838–1906)	9 December 1879	8 February 1881	1 year, 61 days	Conservative	Antonio Cánovas del Castillo	Alfonso XII (1874–1885)	
Venancio González y Fernández (Note: Antonio Cánovas del Castillo (19 March 1880 – 7 April 1880) and Fermín Lasala y Collado (25 October 1880 – 28 November 1880) served as acting ministers.) (1831–1897)	8 February 1881	9 January 1883	1 year, 335 days	Liberal	Práxedes Mateo Sagasta	Alfonso XII (1874–1885)	
Pío Gullón (1835–1917)	9 January 1883	13 October 1883	277 days	Liberal	Práxedes Mateo Sagasta	Alfonso XII (1874–1885)	
Segismundo Moret (1833–1913)	13 October 1883	18 January 1884	97 days	Dynastic Left	José Posada Herrera	Alfonso XII (1874–1885)	
Francisco Romero Robledo (1838–1906)	18 January 1884	13 July 1885	1 year, 176 days	Conservative	Antonio Cánovas del Castillo	Alfonso XII (1874–1885)	
The Marquess of Pozo Rubio (1848–1905)	13 July 1885	27 November 1885	137 days	Conservative	Antonio Cánovas del Castillo	Alfonso XII (1874–1885)	
Venancio González y Fernández (Note: Segismundo Moret was acting minister from August 9 to August 30, 1886.) (1831–1897)	27 November 1885	10 October 1886	317 days	Liberal	Práxedes Mateo Sagasta	Alfonso XIII (1886–1931)	
The Marquess of Muni (1842–1918)	10 October 1886	12 November 1887	1 year, 33 days	Liberal	Práxedes Mateo Sagasta	Alfonso XIII (1886–1931)	
José Luis Albareda y Sezde (1828–1897)	12 November 1887	14 June 1888	215 days	Liberal	Práxedes Mateo Sagasta	Alfonso XIII (1886–1931)	
Segismundo Moret (1833–1913)	14 June 1888	11 December 1888	180 days	Liberal	Práxedes Mateo Sagasta	Alfonso XIII (1886–1931)	
Trinitario Ruiz Capdepón (1836–1911)	11 December 1888	5 July 1890	1 year, 206 days	Liberal	Práxedes Mateo Sagasta	Alfonso XIII (1886–1931)	
Francisco Silvela (1843–1905)	5 July 1890	23 November 1891	1 year, 141 days	Conservative	Antonio Cánovas del Castillo	Alfonso XIII (1886–1931)	
The Marquess of Pazo de la Merced (1823–1898)	23 November 1891	25 June 1892	215 days	Conservative	Antonio Cánovas del Castillo	Alfonso XIII (1886–1931)	
The Marquess of Pozo Rubio (1848–1905)	25 June 1892	30 November 1892	158 days	Conservative	Antonio Cánovas del Castillo	Alfonso XIII (1886–1931)	
Manuel Danvila (1830–1906)	30 November 1892	11 December 1892	11 days	Conservative	Antonio Cánovas del Castillo	Alfonso XIII (1886–1931)	
Venancio González y Fernández (Note: Trinitario Ruiz Capdepón was acting minister from July 27 to August 21, 1893.) (1831–1897)	11 December 1892	14 October 1893	307 days	Liberal	Práxedes Mateo Sagasta	Alfonso XIII (1886–1931)	
Joaquín López Puigcerver (1841–1906)	14 October 1893	12 March 1894	149 days	Liberal	Práxedes Mateo Sagasta	Alfonso XIII (1886–1931)	
Alberto Aguilera (Note: Demetrio Alonso Castrillo was acting minister from September 23 to October 4, 1894.) (1842–1913)	12 March 1894	4 November 1894	237 days	Liberal	Práxedes Mateo Sagasta	Alfonso XIII (1886–1931)	
Trinitario Ruiz Capdepón (1836–1911)	4 November 1894	23 March 1895	139 days	Liberal	Práxedes Mateo Sagasta	Alfonso XIII (1886–1931)	
Fernando Cos-Gayón (1825–1898)	23 March 1895	4 October 1897	2 years, 195 days	Conservative	Antonio Cánovas del Castillo	Alfonso XIII (1886–1931)	
Fernando Cos-Gayón (1825–1898)	23 March 1895	4 October 1897	2 years, 195 days	Conservative	Marcelo Azcárraga (Note: Acting prime minister after the assassination of Antonio Cánovas del Castillo.)	Alfonso XIII (1886–1931)	
Trinitario Ruiz Capdepón (1836–1911)	4 October 1897	4 March 1899	1 year, 151 days	Liberal	Práxedes Mateo Sagasta	Alfonso XIII (1886–1931)	
Eduardo Dato (1856–1921)	4 March 1899	23 October 1900	1 year, 233 days	Conservative	Francisco Silvela	Alfonso XIII (1886–1931)	
Francisco Javier Ugarte Pagés (1852–1919)	23 October 1900	6 March 1901	134 days	Conservative	Marcelo Azcárraga	Alfonso XIII (1886–1931)	
Segismundo Moret (1833–1913)	6 March 1901	15 July 1901	131 days	Liberal	Práxedes Mateo Sagasta	Alfonso XIII (1886–1931)	
Miguel Villanueva y Gómez (1852–1931) acting minister	15 July 1901	23 July 1901	8 days	Liberal	Práxedes Mateo Sagasta	Alfonso XIII (1886–1931)	
Alfonso González Lozano (Note: Miguel Villanueva y Gómez was acting minister from January 9 to January 17, 1902.) (1856–1912)	23 July 1901	19 March 1902	239 days	Liberal	Práxedes Mateo Sagasta	Alfonso XIII (1886–1931)	
Segismundo Moret (1833–1913)	19 March 1902	6 December 1902	262 days	Liberal	Práxedes Mateo Sagasta	Alfonso XIII (1886–1931)	
Antonio Maura (1853–1925)	6 December 1902	20 July 1903	226 days	Conservative	Francisco Silvela	Alfonso XIII (1886–1931)	
Antonio García Alix (1852–1911)	20 July 1903	5 December 1903	138 days	Conservative	The Marquess of Pozo Rubio	Alfonso XIII (1886–1931)	
José Sánchez-Guerra y Martínez (Note: Manuel Allendesalazar was acting minister from July 12 to August 7, 1904.) (1859–1935)	5 December 1903	5 December 1904	1 year, 0 days	Conservative	Antonio Maura	Alfonso XIII (1886–1931)	
Manuel Allendesalazar (1856–1923)	5 December 1904	16 December 1904	11 days	Conservative	Antonio Maura	Alfonso XIII (1886–1931)	
The Marquess of Vadillo (1856–1923)	16 December 1904	27 January 1905	42 days	Conservative	Marcelo Azcárraga	Alfonso XIII (1886–1931)	
Augusto González Besada (1865–1919)	27 January 1905	23 June 1905	147 days	Conservative	The Marquess of Pozo Rubio	Alfonso XIII (1886–1931)	
The Marquess of Alhucemas (1859–1938)	23 June 1905	1 December 1905	161 days	Liberal	Eugenio Montero Ríos	Alfonso XIII (1886–1931)	
The Count of Romanones (Note: Segismundo Moret served as acting minister from March 23 to April 7, 1906.) (1863–1950)	1 December 1905	10 June 1906	191 days	Liberal	Segismundo Moret	Alfonso XIII (1886–1931)	
Benigno Quiroga y López Ballesteros (1850–1908)	10 June 1906	6 July 1906	26 days	Liberal	Segismundo Moret	Alfonso XIII (1886–1931)	
Bernabé Dávila y Bertololi (c. 1837–1914)	6 July 1906	30 November 1906	147 days	Liberal	José López Domínguez	Alfonso XIII (1886–1931)	
Benigno Quiroga y López Ballesteros (1850–1908)	30 November 1906	4 December 1906	4 days	Liberal	Segismundo Moret	Alfonso XIII (1886–1931)	
The Count of Romanones (1863–1950)	4 December 1906	25 January 1907	52 days	Liberal	The Marquess of Vega de Armijo	Alfonso XIII (1886–1931)	
Juan de la Cierva y Peñafiel (1864–1938)	25 January 1907	21 October 1909	2 years, 269 days	Conservative	Antonio Maura	Alfonso XIII (1886–1931)	
Segismundo Moret (1833–1913)	21 October 1909	9 February 1910	111 days	Liberal	Segismundo Moret	Alfonso XIII (1886–1931)	
The Count of Sagasta (Note: Juan Fernández Latorre was acting minister from June 20 to July 16, 1910.) (1859–1929)	9 February 1910	2 January 1911	327 days	Liberal	José Canalejas y Méndez	Alfonso XIII (1886–1931)	
Eduardo Cobián (Note: Alfredo de Zavala y Camps was acting minister from February 21 to March 7, 1911.) (1859–1929)	2 January 1911	3 April 1911	91 days	Liberal	José Canalejas y Méndez	Alfonso XIII (1886–1931)	
Trinitario Ruiz Capdepón (1836–1911)	3 April 1911	29 June 1911	87 days	Liberal	José Canalejas y Méndez	Alfonso XIII (1886–1931)	
Antonio Barroso y Castillo (1854–1916)	29 June 1911	31 December 1912	1 year, 185 days	Liberal	José Canalejas y Méndez	Alfonso XIII (1886–1931)	
Antonio Barroso y Castillo (1854–1916)	29 June 1911	31 December 1912	1 year, 185 days	Liberal	The Marquess of Alhucemas (Note: He acted as acting prime minister after the assassination of José Canalejas on 12 November 1912)	Alfonso XIII (1886–1931)	
Antonio Barroso y Castillo (1854–1916)	29 June 1911	31 December 1912	1 year, 185 days	Liberal	The Count of Romanones	Alfonso XIII (1886–1931)	
Santiago Alba y Bonifaz (1872–1949)	31 December 1912	27 October 1913	300 days	Liberal	The Count of Romanones	Alfonso XIII (1886–1931)	
José Sánchez-Guerra y Martínez (1859–1935)	27 October 1913	9 December 1915	2 years, 43 days	Conservative	Eduardo Dato	Alfonso XIII (1886–1931)	
Santiago Alba y Bonifaz (1872–1949)	9 December 1915	30 April 1916	143 days	Liberal	The Count of Romanones	Alfonso XIII (1886–1931)	
Joaquín Ruiz Jiménez (1854–1934)	30 April 1916	19 April 1917	352 days	Liberal	The Count of Romanones	Alfonso XIII (1886–1931)	
Julio Burell (1859–1919)	19 April 1917	11 June 1917	53 days	Liberal	The Marquess of Alhucemas	Alfonso XIII (1886–1931)	
José Sánchez-Guerra y Martínez (1859–1935)	11 June 1917	3 November 1917	145 days	Conservative	Eduardo Dato	Alfonso XIII (1886–1931)	
The Viscount of Matamala (1849–1923)	3 November 1917	22 March 1918	139 days	Liberal	The Marquess of Alhucemas	Alfonso XIII (1886–1931)	
The Marquess of Alhucemas (Note: José Rosado y Gil was acting minister from August 12 to August 31, 1918.) (1859–1938)	22 March 1918	9 November 1918	232 days	Conservative	Antonio Maura	Alfonso XIII (1886–1931)	
Luis Silvela Casado (1865–1928)	9 November 1918	5 December 1918	26 days	Liberal	The Marquess of Alhucemas	Alfonso XIII (1886–1931)	
The Count of Gimeno (1852–1936)	5 December 1918	15 April 1919	131 days	Liberal	The Count of Romanones	Alfonso XIII (1886–1931)	
Antonio Goicoechea (1876–1953)	15 April 1919	20 July 1919	96 days	Conservative	Antonio Maura	Alfonso XIII (1886–1931)	
Manuel de Burgos y Mazo (1862–1946)	20 July 1919	12 December 1919	145 days	Conservative	Joaquín Sánchez de Toca	Alfonso XIII (1886–1931)	
Joaquín Fernández Prida (1863–1942)	12 December 1919	5 May 1920	145 days	Conservative	Manuel Allendesalazar	Alfonso XIII (1886–1931)	
Francisco Bergamín y García (Note: Juan José Ruano de la Sota served as acting minister from August 14 to September 1, 1920.) (1855–1937)	5 May 1920	1 September 1920	119 days	Conservative	Eduardo Dato	Alfonso XIII (1886–1931)	
Francisco Bergamín y García (1855–1937)	5 May 1920	1 September 1920	119 days	Conservative	The Count of Bugallal (Note: He acted acting prime minister after the assassination of Eduardo Dato from March 8 to March 13, 1921)	Alfonso XIII (1886–1931)	
The Count of Bugallal (1861–1932)	1 September 1920	14 August 1921	347 days	Conservative	The Count of Bugallal	Alfonso XIII (1886–1931)	
The Count of Bugallal (1861–1932)	1 September 1920	14 August 1921	347 days	Conservative	Manuel Allendesalazar	Alfonso XIII (1886–1931)	
The Count of Coello de Portugal (1868–1953)	14 August 1921	8 March 1922	206 days	Conservative	Antonio Maura	Alfonso XIII (1886–1931)	
Vicente Piniés Bayona (1875–1943)	8 March 1922	7 December 1922	274 days	Conservative	José Sánchez-Guerra y Martínez	Alfonso XIII (1886–1931)	
The Duke of Almodóvar del Valle (1872–1931)	7 December 1922	15 September 1923	282 days	Liberal	The Marquess of Alhucemas	Alfonso XIII (1886–1931)	
Millán Millán de Priego (1872–1936) acting minister	17 September 1923	22 September 1923	5 days	Independent	The Marquess of Estella	Alfonso XIII (1886–1931)	
Severiano Martínez Anido (Note: From September 1923 to December 1925, he served as Under-Secretary of the Governance in charge of the ministerial department.) (1862–1938)	22 September 1923	30 January 1930	6 years, 130 days	Military	The Marquess of Estella	Alfonso XIII (1886–1931)	
Severiano Martínez Anido (1862–1938)	22 September 1923	30 January 1930	6 years, 130 days	Patriotic Union	The Marquess of Estella	Alfonso XIII (1886–1931)	
Enrique Marzo Balaguer (Note: Joaquín de Montes y Jovellar served as acting minister twice: from June 18 to June 21, 1930 and from September 20 to September 28, 1930.) (1875–1947)	30 January 1930	25 November 1930	299 days	Military	The Count of Xauen	Alfonso XIII (1886–1931)	
Leopoldo Matos y Massieu (1878–1936)	25 November 1930	18 February 1931	85 days	Conservative	The Count of Xauen	Alfonso XIII (1886–1931)	
The Marquess of Hoyos (1874–1959)	18 February 1931	14 April 1931	55 days	Monarchist	Juan Bautista Aznar-Cabañas	Alfonso XIII (1886–1931)	

== Second Republic (1931–1939) & Dictatorship (1939–1975) ==
Name	Term		Duration	Party	Government		Ref.
Miguel Maura (1887–1971)	14 April 1931	14 October 1931	246 days	Liberal Republican Right	Niceto Alcalá-Zamora	Niceto Alcalá-Zamora (1931–1936)	
Santiago Casares Quiroga (1884–1950)	14 October 1931	12 September 1933	1 year, 333 days	Galician Autonomism	Manuel Azaña	Niceto Alcalá-Zamora (1931–1936)	
Santiago Casares Quiroga (1884–1950)	14 October 1931	12 September 1933	1 year, 333 days	Republican Left	Manuel Azaña	Niceto Alcalá-Zamora (1931–1936)	
Diego Martínez Barrio (1883–1962)	12 September 1933	8 October 1933	26 days	Radical Republican	Alejandro Lerroux	Niceto Alcalá-Zamora (1931–1936)	
Manuel Rico Avello (1886–1936)	8 October 1933	23 January 1934	107 days	Independent	Diego Martínez Barrio	Niceto Alcalá-Zamora (1931–1936)	
Manuel Rico Avello (1886–1936)	8 October 1933	23 January 1934	107 days	Independent	Alejandro Lerroux	Niceto Alcalá-Zamora (1931–1936)	
Diego Martínez Barrio (1883–1962)	23 January 1934	3 March 1934	39 days	Radical Republican	Alejandro Lerroux	Niceto Alcalá-Zamora (1931–1936)	
Rafael Salazar Alonso (1895–1936)	3 March 1934	4 October 1934	215 days	Radical Republican	Alejandro Lerroux	Niceto Alcalá-Zamora (1931–1936)	
Rafael Salazar Alonso (1895–1936)	3 March 1934	4 October 1934	215 days	Radical Republican	Ricardo Samper	Niceto Alcalá-Zamora (1931–1936)	
Eloy Vaquero Cantillo (1888–1960)	4 October 1934	3 April 1935	181 days	Radical Republican	Alejandro Lerroux	Niceto Alcalá-Zamora (1931–1936)	
Manuel Portela Valladares (1867–1952)	3 April 1935	25 September 1935	175 days	Independent	Alejandro Lerroux	Niceto Alcalá-Zamora (1931–1936)	
Joaquín de Pablo-Blanco Torres (1896–1947)	25 September 1935	14 December 1935	80 days	Radical Republican	Joaquín Chapaprieta	Niceto Alcalá-Zamora (1931–1936)	
Manuel Portela Valladares (1867–1952)	14 December 1935	19 February 1936	67 days	Independent	Manuel Portela Valladares	Niceto Alcalá-Zamora (1931–1936)	
Manuel Portela Valladares (1867–1952)	14 December 1935	19 February 1936	67 days	Democratic Centre	Manuel Portela Valladares	Niceto Alcalá-Zamora (1931–1936)	
Amós Salvador Carreras (Note: Santiago Casares Quiroga was acting minister from April 17 to May 2, 1936.) (1879–1963)	19 February 1936	2 May 1936	73 days	Republican Left	Manuel Azaña	Niceto Alcalá-Zamora (1931–1936)	
Santiago Casares Quiroga (1884–1950) acting minister	2 May 1936	13 May 1936	11 days	Republican Left	Manuel Azaña	Niceto Alcalá-Zamora (1931–1936)	
Santiago Casares Quiroga (1884–1950) acting minister	2 May 1936	13 May 1936	11 days	Republican Left	Augusto Barcia Trelles (Note: Acting prime minister from 10 to 13 May 1936)	Manuel Azaña (1936–1939)	
Juan Moles (Note: Santiago Casares Quiroga was acting minister from May 13 to May 15, 1936.) (1871–1945)	13 May 1936	19 July 1936	67 days	Republican Left	Santiago Casares Quiroga	Manuel Azaña (1936–1939)	
Augusto Barcia Trelles (1881–1961)	19 July 1936	19 July 1936	0 days	Republican Left	Diego Martínez Barrio	Manuel Azaña (1936–1939)	
Start of the Spanish Civil War						Manuel Azaña (1936–1939)	
Republican side						Manuel Azaña (1936–1939)	
Sebastián Pozas Perea (1876–1946)	19 July 1936	4 September 1936	47 days	Military	José Giral	Manuel Azaña (1936–1939)	
Ángel Galarza (1892–1966)	4 September 1936	17 May 1937	255 days	Socialist	Francisco Largo Caballero	Manuel Azaña (1936–1939)	
Julián Zugazagoitia (Note: Prime Minister Juan Negrín served as acting interior minister from May 17 to May 24, 1937.) (1899–1940)	17 May 1937	5 April 1938	323 days	Socialist	Juan Negrín	Manuel Azaña (1936–1939)	
Paulino Gómez (1889–1977)	5 April 1938	5 March 1939	334 days	Socialist	Juan Negrín	Manuel Azaña (1936–1939)	
Wenceslao Carrillo (1889–1963)	5 March 1939	31 March 1939	26 days	Socialist	National Defence Council	José Miaja (1939)	
Rebel side
Francisco Fermoso Blanco (Note: Serving under the title of "Governor-General".) (1870–1955)	4 October 1936	4 November 1936	31 days	Military	Junta Técnica del Estado	Francisco Franco (1939–1975)	
Luis Valdés Cavanilles (1874–1950)	4 November 1936	31 January 1938	1 year, 88 days	Military	Junta Técnica del Estado	Francisco Franco (1939–1975)	
Severiano Martínez Anido (Note: In 1938, Franco divided the Governance affairs between two ministries: Public Order and Interior. When Severiano Martínez, Minister of Public Order, died in December 1938, Serrano Suñer, Minister of the Interior, took on all responsibilities and his department was renamed as "Ministry of the Governance".) (1862–1938)	31 January 1938	24 December 1938†	327 days	Military	Franco I	Francisco Franco (1939–1975)	
Juan Oller Piñol acting minister	24 December 1938	31 December 1938	7 days	Independent	Franco I	Francisco Franco (1939–1975)	
Ramón Serrano Suñer (1901–2003)	31 January 1938	1 April 1939	1 year, 60 days	National Movement	Franco I	Francisco Franco (1939–1975)	
End of the Spanish Civil War						Francisco Franco (1939–1975)	
Ramón Serrano Suñer (Note: Due to absence, The Marquess of Davila, Minister of National Defence, served as acting minister from June 1 to June 14, 1939. Also, from September 12 to October 16, 1940, Esteban de Bilbao Eguía, Minister of Justice, also served in such capacity.) (1901–2003)	1 April 1939	18 October 1940	1 year, 200 days	National Movement	Franco I	Francisco Franco (1939–1975)	
Ramón Serrano Suñer (1901–2003)	1 April 1939	18 October 1940	1 year, 200 days	National Movement	Franco II	Francisco Franco (1939–1975)	
Juan Oller Piñol (1902–2001) acting minister	18 October 1940	5 May 1941	199 days	National Movement	Franco II	Francisco Franco (1939–1975)	
Valentín Galarza (1882–1951)	5 May 1941	3 September 1942	1 year, 121 days	National Movement	Franco II	Francisco Franco (1939–1975)	
Blas Pérez González (1898–1978)	3 September 1942	25 February 1957	14 years, 175 days	National Movement	Franco II	Francisco Franco (1939–1975)	
Blas Pérez González (1898–1978)	3 September 1942	25 February 1957	14 years, 175 days	National Movement	Franco III	Francisco Franco (1939–1975)	
Blas Pérez González (1898–1978)	3 September 1942	25 February 1957	14 years, 175 days	National Movement	Franco IV	Francisco Franco (1939–1975)	
Camilo Alonso Vega (1889–1971)	25 February 1957	29 October 1969	12 years, 246 days	National Movement	Franco V	Francisco Franco (1939–1975)	
Camilo Alonso Vega (1889–1971)	25 February 1957	29 October 1969	12 years, 246 days	National Movement	Franco VI	Francisco Franco (1939–1975)	
Camilo Alonso Vega (1889–1971)	25 February 1957	29 October 1969	12 years, 246 days	National Movement	Franco VII	Francisco Franco (1939–1975)	
Tomás Garicano (1910–1988)	29 October 1969	11 June 1973	3 years, 225 days	National Movement	Franco VIII	Francisco Franco (1939–1975)	
The Marquess of Arias Navarro (1908–1989)	11 June 1973	3 January 1974	206 days	National Movement	Luis Carrero Blanco	Francisco Franco (1939–1975)	
The Marquess of Arias Navarro (1908–1989)	11 June 1973	3 January 1974	206 days	National Movement	The Duke of Fernández-Miranda (acting)	Francisco Franco (1939–1975)	
The Marquess of Arias Navarro (1908–1989)	11 June 1973	3 January 1974	206 days	National Movement	The Marquess of Arias Navarro	Francisco Franco (1939–1975)	
José García Hernández (1915–2000)	3 January 1974	11 December 1975	1 year, 342 days	National Movement	The Marquess of Arias Navarro	Francisco Franco (1939–1975)	
José García Hernández (1915–2000)	3 January 1974	11 December 1975	1 year, 342 days	National Movement	The Marquess of Arias Navarro	Juan Carlos I (1975–2014)	

== Second Bourbon Restoration (1975–) ==
Name	Term		Duration	Party	Government		Ref.
Manuel Fraga (1922–2012)	11 December 1975	7 July 1976	209 days	Movimiento Nacional	The Marquess of Arias Navarro	Juan Carlos I (1975–2014)	
Rodolfo Martín Villa (1934–)	7 July 1976	5 April 1979	2 years, 272 days	Centrist	The Duke of Suárez	Juan Carlos I (1975–2014)	
Antonio Ibáñez Freire (1913–2003)	5 April 1979	2 May 1980	1 year, 27 days	Military	The Duke of Suárez	Juan Carlos I (1975–2014)	
Juan José Rosón (1932–1986)	2 May 1980	2 December 1988	2 years, 214 days	Centrist	The Marquess of Ría de Ribadeo	Juan Carlos I (1975–2014)	
José Barrionuevo (1942–)	2 December 1982	11 July 1988	5 years, 222 days	Socialist	Felipe González	Juan Carlos I (1975–2014)	
José Luis Corcuera (1944–)	11 July 1988	24 November 1993	5 years, 136 days	Socialist	Felipe González	Juan Carlos I (1975–2014)	
Antoni Asunción (1951–2016)	24 November 1993	5 May 1994	162 days	Socialist	Felipe González	Juan Carlos I (1975–2014)	
Juan Alberto Belloch (1950–)	5 May 1994	5 May 1996	2 years, 0 days	Socialist	Felipe González	Juan Carlos I (1975–2014)	
Jaime Mayor Oreja (1951–)	5 May 1996	27 February 2001	4 years, 298 days	Popular	José María Aznar	Juan Carlos I (1975–2014)	
Mariano Rajoy (1955–)	27 February 2001	9 July 2002	1 year, 132 days	Popular	José María Aznar	Juan Carlos I (1975–2014)	
Ángel Acebes (1958–)	9 July 2002	18 April 2004	1 year, 283 days	Popular	José María Aznar	Juan Carlos I (1975–2014)	
José Antonio Alonso Suárez (1960–2017)	18 April 2004	11 April 2006	1 year, 358 days	Socialist	José Luis Rodríguez Zapatero	Juan Carlos I (1975–2014)	
Alfredo Pérez Rubalcaba (1951–2019)	11 April 2006	11 July 2011	1 year, 62 days	Socialist	José Luis Rodríguez Zapatero	Juan Carlos I (1975–2014)	
Antonio Camacho Vizcaíno (1964–)	11 July 2011	22 December 2011	164 days	Socialist	José Luis Rodríguez Zapatero	Juan Carlos I (1975–2014)	
Jorge Fernández Díaz (1950–)	22 December 2011	4 November 2016	4 years, 318 days	Popular	Mariano Rajoy	Juan Carlos I (1975–2014)	
Jorge Fernández Díaz (1950–)	22 December 2011	4 November 2016	4 years, 318 days	Popular	Mariano Rajoy	Felipe VI (2014-present)	
Juan Ignacio Zoido (1957–)	4 November 2016	7 June 2018	1 year, 215 days	Popular	Mariano Rajoy	Felipe VI (2014-present)	
Fernando Grande-Marlaska (1962–)	7 June 2018	Incumbent	8 years, 159 days	Independent	Pedro Sánchez	Felipe VI (2014-present)	
