= List of prime ministers of Spain by length of tenure =

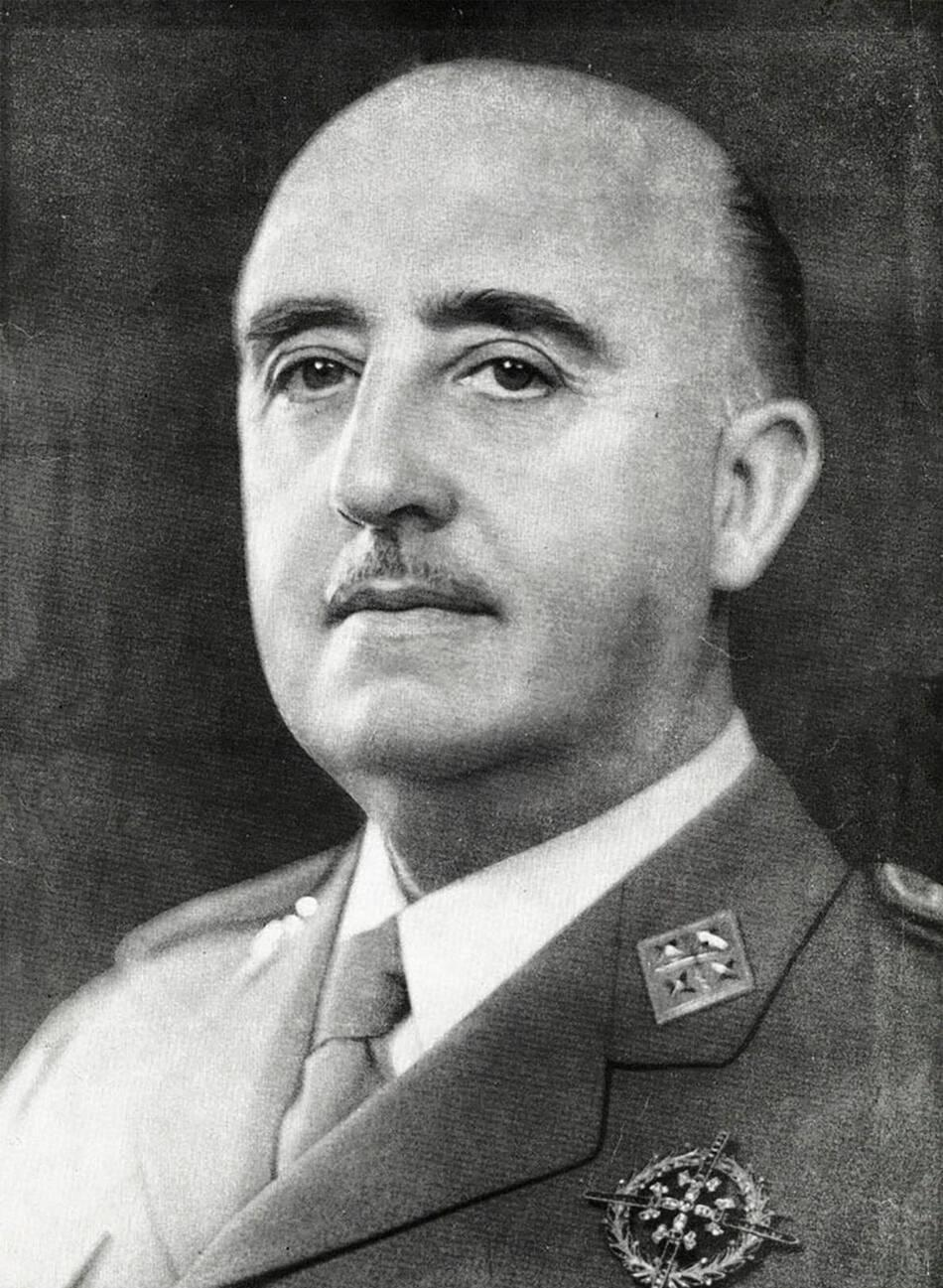
35 years and 129 days:
Francisco Franco (1938–1973)

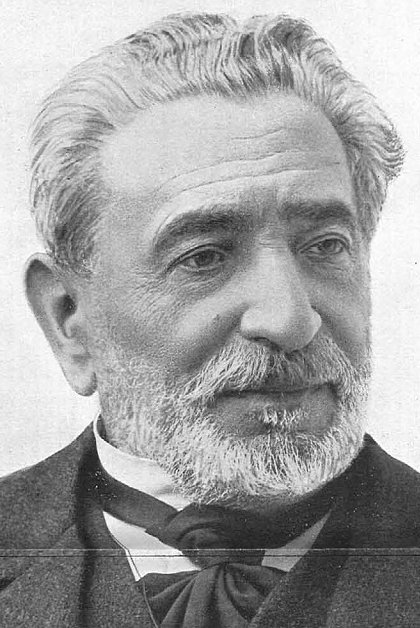
13 years and 175 days:
Práxedes Mateo Sagasta
(1871–1872, 1874, 1881-1883, 1885-1890, 1892-1895, 1897-1899 and 1901–1902)

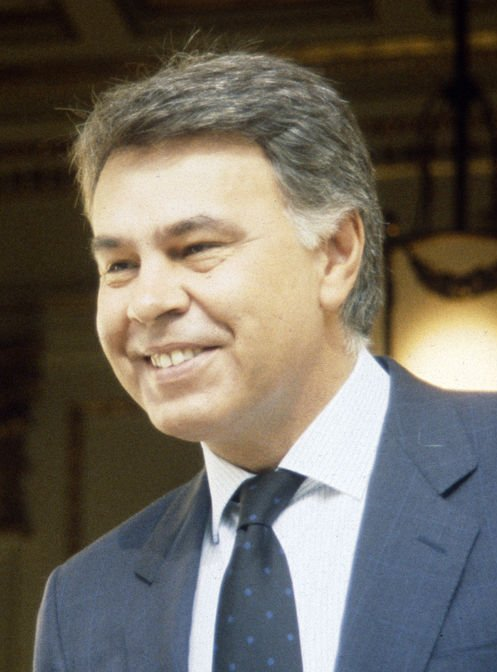
13 years and 155 days:
Felipe González (1982–1996)

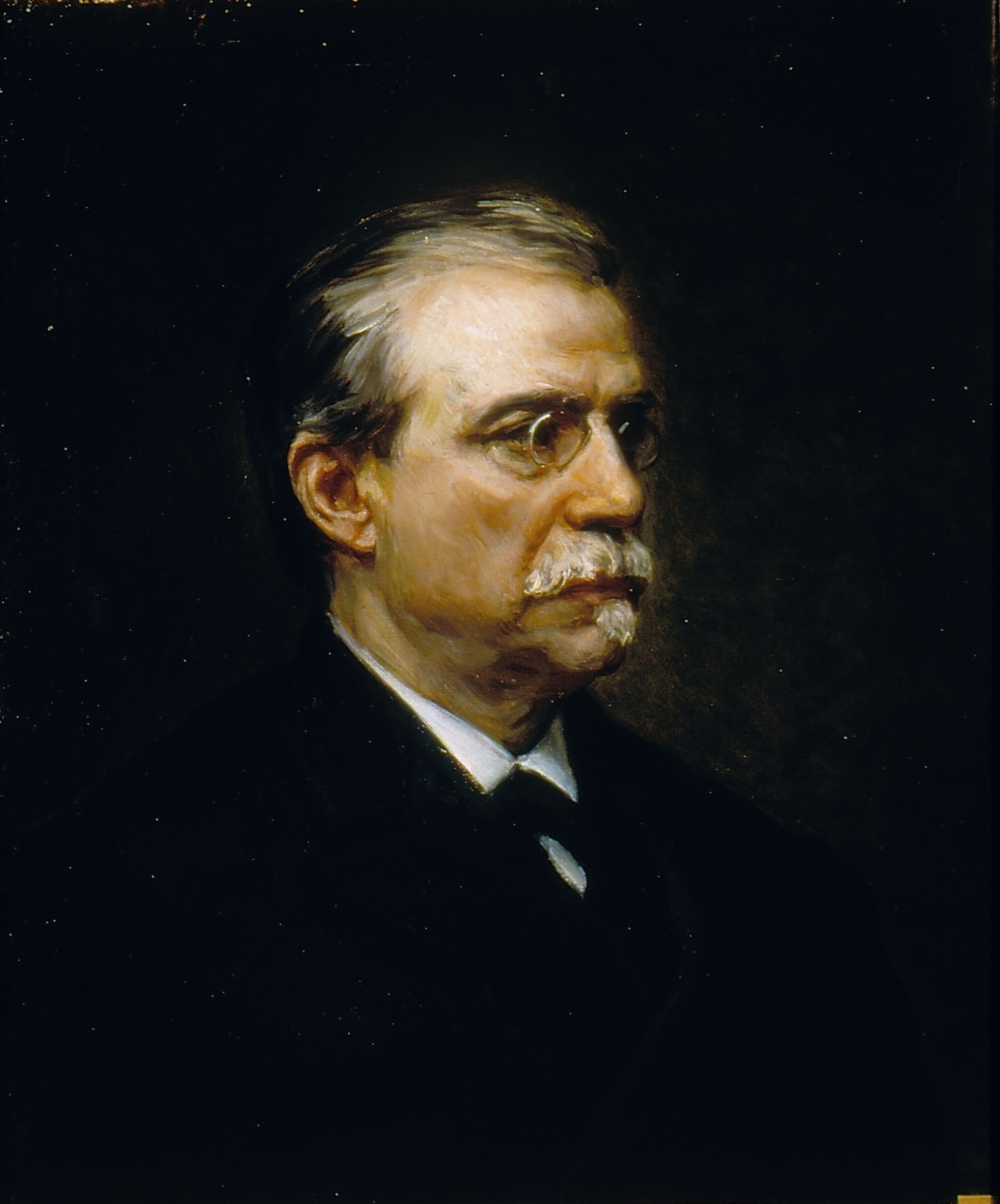
11 years and 290 days:
Antonio Cánovas del Castillo (1874-1881, 1884-1885, 1890-1892 and 1895-1897)

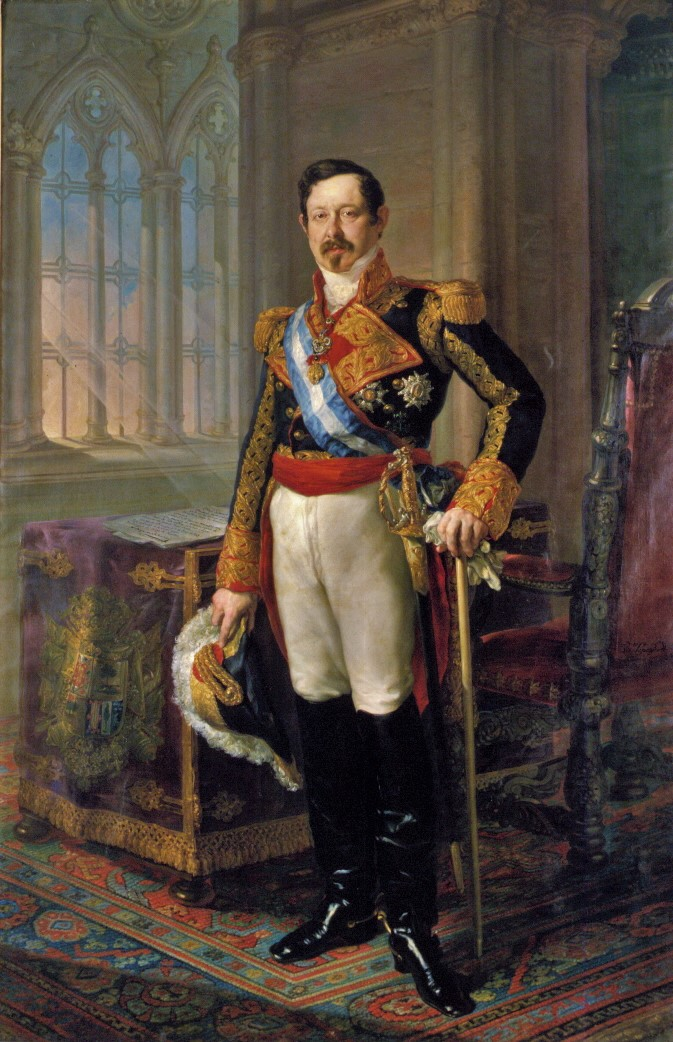
8 years and 240 days:
Ramón María Narváez (1844-1846, 1847-1851, 1856-1857, 1864-1865 and 1866-1868)

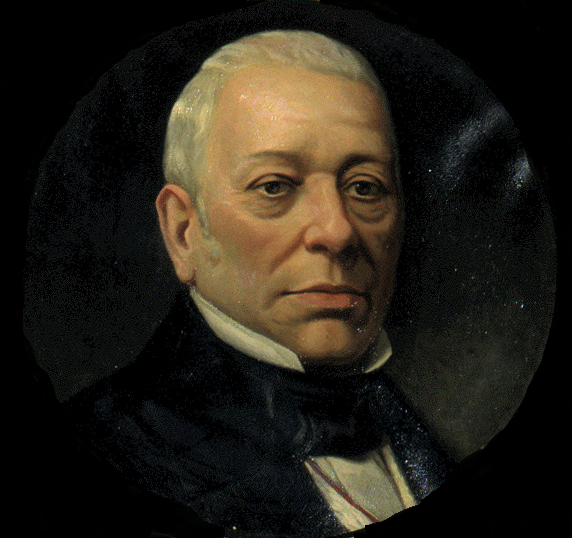
5 days:
Vicente Sancho y Cobertores (1840)

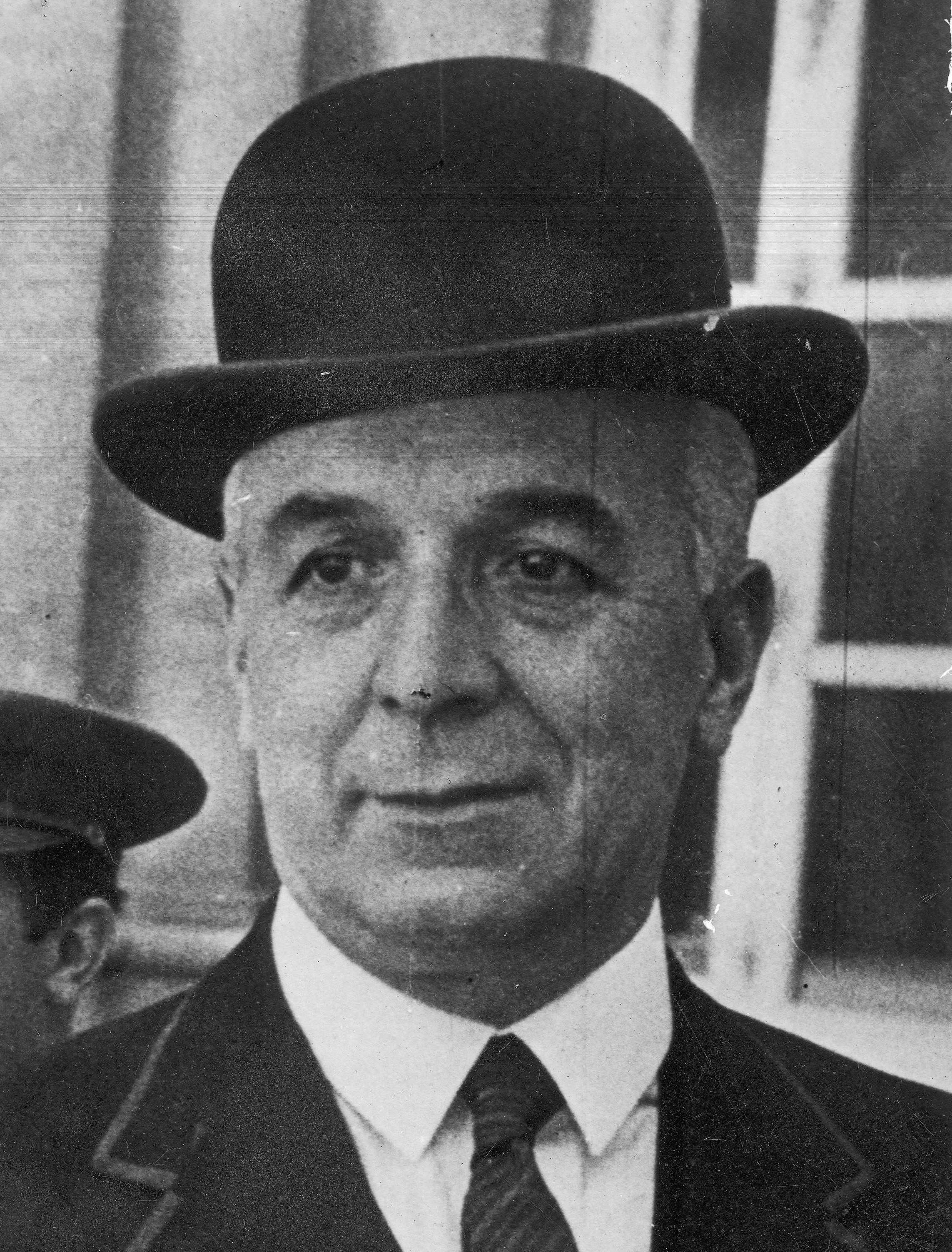
3 days:
Augusto Barcía Trelles (1936)

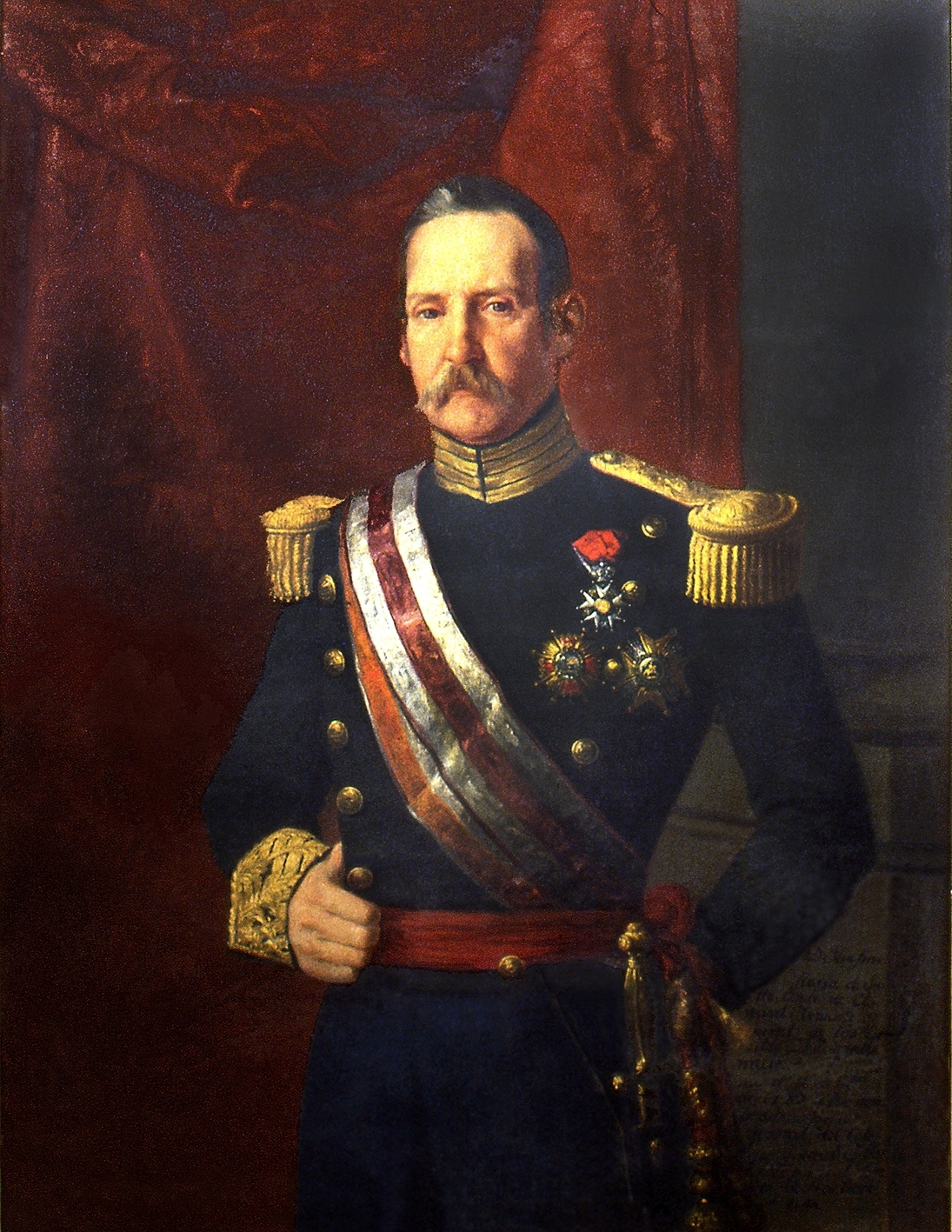
1 day:
The Count of Clonard (1849)

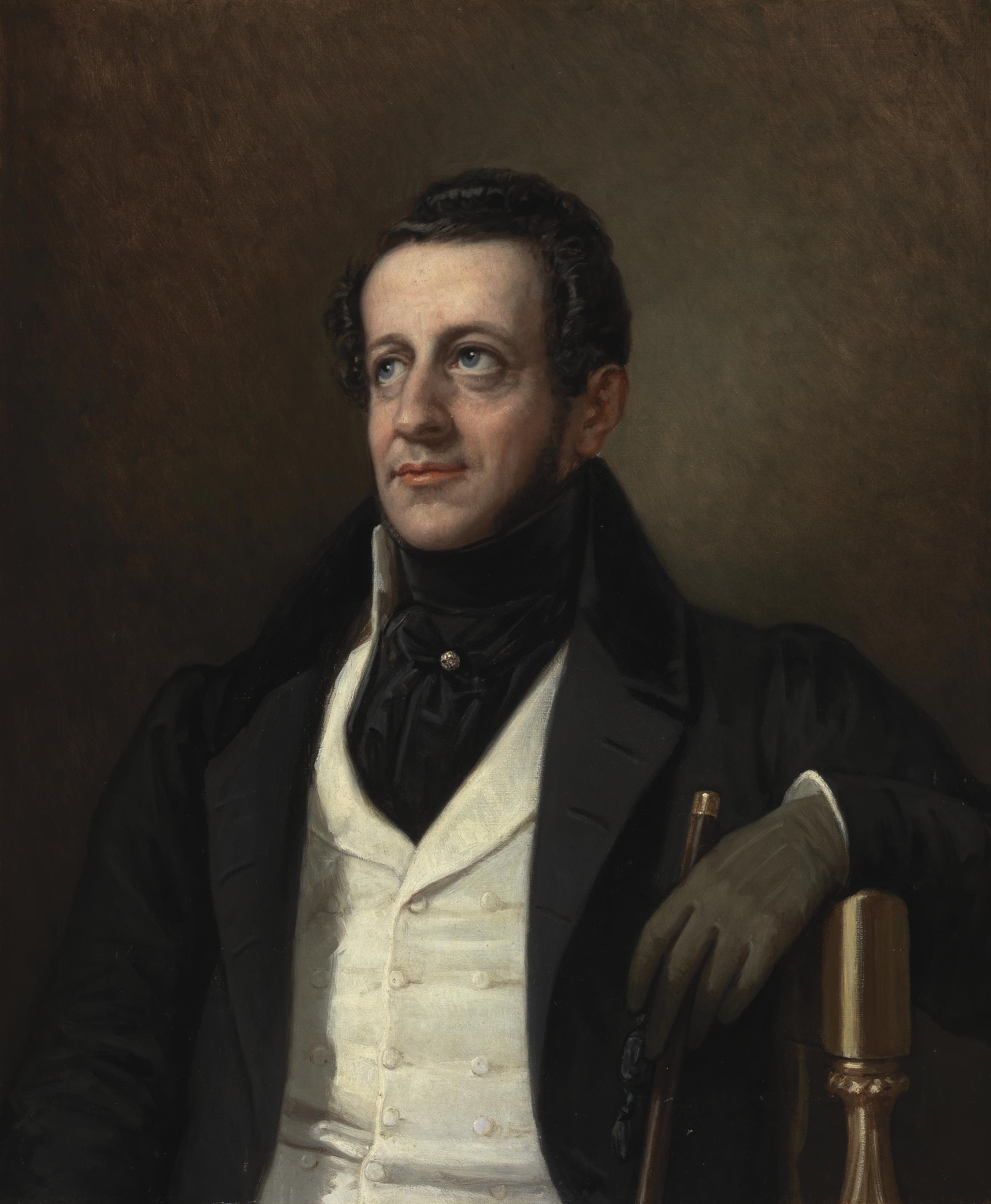
1 day:
The Duke of Rivas (1854)

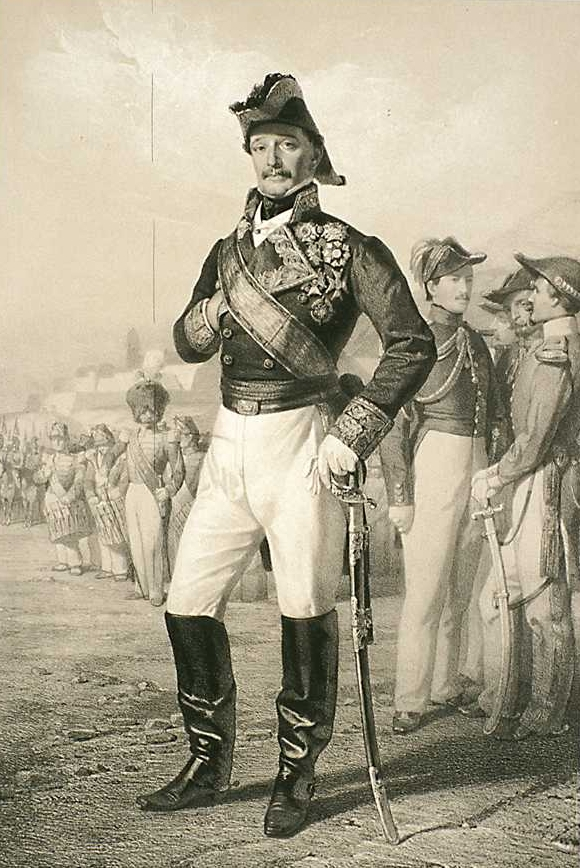
1 day:
The Marquess of Mendigorría (1854)

This is a list of prime ministers of Spain by time in office. The basis of the list is the inclusive number of days from being sworn in until leaving office.

Of the 102 prime ministers, only four served more than 10 years while sixty-six have served less than a year.

Francisco Franco, who also served as the Head of State until his death, is the only person to have served in the post of prime minister for more than two decades, ruling for a total of 35 years that were preceded by the coup of 1936 and the Spanish Civil War.

== Ordered by tenure ==
Rank	Prime Minister	Length served	Terms	Party	Start
1	Francisco Franco	35 years, 129 days	1	National Movement	1939
2	Práxedes Mateo Sagasta	13 years, 175 days	7	Liberal / Constitutional	1871
3	Felipe González	13 years, 155 days	4	PSOE	1982
4	Antonio Cánovas del Castillo	11 years, 290 days	6	Conservative	1874
5	Ramón María Narváez	8 years, 240 days	7	Moderate	1844
6	Pedro Sánchez	8 years, 141 days (incumbent)	3	PSOE	2018
7	José María Aznar	7 years, 348 days	2	PP	1996
8	José Luis Rodríguez Zapatero	7 years, 248 days	2	PSOE	2004
9	Mariano Rajoy	6 years, 162 days	2	PP	2011
10	Miguel Primo de Rivera	6 years, 137 days	1	Patriotic Union	1923
11	Leopoldo O'Donnell	5 years, 180 days	4	Liberal Union	1856
12	Manuel González Salmón	5 years, 152 days	1	Nonpartisan	1826
13	Antonio Maura	5 years, 84 days	5	Conservative / Maurist	1903
14	Adolfo Suárez	4 years, 236 days	2	UCD / National Movement	1976
15	Eduardo Dato	3 years, 130 days	3	Conservative	1913
16	Baldomero Espartero	2 years, 293 days	3	Progressive	1837
17	José Canalejas	2 years, 277 days	1	Liberal	1910
18	The Count of Romanones	2 years, 243 days	3	Liberal	1912
19	Francisco Cea Bermúdez	2 years, 211 days	2	Nonpartisan	1824
20	Carlos Arias Navarro	2 years, 185 days	1	National Movement	1973
21	Francisco Silvela	2 years, 94 days	2	Conservative	1899
22	Manuel Azaña	2 years, 49 days	2	Republican Action / IR	1931
23	Juan Bravo Murillo	1 year, 335 days	1	Moderate	1851
24	Juan Negrín	1 year, 318 days	1	PSOE	1937
25	Leopoldo Calvo-Sotelo	1 year, 279 days	1	UCD	1981
26	Evaristo Pérez de Castro	1 year, 224 days	1	Moderate	1838
27	Francisco Javier de Istúriz	1 year, 191 days	3	Moderate	1836
28	Francisco Serrano	1 year, 166 days	4	Liberal Union / Constitutional	1868
29	Juan Prim	1 year, 165 days	2	Progressive	1869
30	Alejandro Lerroux	1 year, 150 days	3	PRR	1933
31	Francisco Martínez de la Rosa	1 year, 143 days	1	Moderate	1834
32	Manuel García Prieto	1 year, 135 days	4	Liberal Democratic	1917
33	The Count of Heredia-Spínola	1 year, 98 days	2	Nonpartisan	1823
34	The Marquess of Valdeterrazo	1 year, 51 days	2	Progressive	1840
35	Dámaso Berenguer	1 year, 19 days	1	Military	1930
36	José María Calatrava	1 year, 4 days	1	Progressive	1836
37	The Marquess of Miraflores	353 days	2	Moderate	1846
38	Segismundo Moret	332 days	3	Liberal	1905
39	The Marquess of Rodil	326 days	1	Progressive	1842
40	Manuel Ruiz Zorrilla	317 days	2	Radical	1871
41	The Count of San Luis	301 days	1	Moderate	1853
42	Luis González Bravo	299 days	2	Moderate	1843
42	Manuel Allendesalazar	299 days	2	Conservative	1919
42	The Duke of the Infantado	299 days	1	Nonpartisan	1825
45	Raimundo Fernández-Villaverde	285 days	2	Conservative	1903
46	Arsenio Martínez Campos	277 days	1	Conservative	1879
47	José Sánchez Guerra	274 days	1	Conservative	1922
48	Francisco Largo Caballero	255 days	1	PSOE	1936
48	The Count of la Alcudia	255 days	1	Nonpartisan	1832
50	Juan Álvarez Mendizábal	233 days	1	Progressive	1835
51	Marcelo Azcárraga Palmero	220 days	3	Conservative	1897
52	Alejandro Mon	199 days	1	Moderate	1864
53	Luis Carrero Blanco	195 days	1	National Movement	1973
54	Niceto Alcalá-Zamora	183 days	1	DLR	1931
55	Saturnino Calderón Collantes	175 days	1	Liberal Union	1859
56	Eugenio Montero Ríos	161 days	1	Liberal	1905
57	Ricardo Samper	159 days	1	PRR	1934
58	Francisco de Lersundi	158 days	1	Moderate	1853
59	Joaquín Francisco Pacheco	156 days	1	Moderate	1847
60	José López Domínguez	147 days	1	Liberal	1906
61	Joaquín Sánchez de Toca	145 days	1	Conservative	1919
62	Joaquín María López	130 days	2	Progressive	1843
63	Juan de Zavala	123 days	1	Constitutional	1874
64	The Count of Alcoy	121 days	1	Moderate	1852
65	Estanislao Figueras	119 days	1	PRDF	1873
66	Emilio Castelar	118 days	1	PRDF	1873
67	The Count of Toreno	99 days	1	Moderate	1835
68	José Posada Herrera	97 days	1	Dynastic Left	1883
69	The Duke of Frías	94 days	1	Moderate	1838
70	The Marquess of Nervión	91 days	1	Moderate	1857
71	Joaquín Jovellar y Soler	81 days	1	Conservative	1875
72	Joaquín Chapaprieta	80 days	1	Nonpartisan	1935
73	José Malcampo	77 days	1	Constitutional	1871
74	Diego Martínez Barrio	70 days	2	PRR / UR	1933
75	Manuel Portela Valladares	67 days	1	Democratic Centre	1935
76	Santiago Casares Quiroga	66 days	1	IR	1936
77	Álvaro Gómez Becerra	65 days	1	Progressive	1843
78	Eusebio Bardají	59 days	1	Moderate	1837
78	The Duke of Sotomayor	59 days	1	Moderate	1847
80	Juan Bautista Aznar-Cabañas	55 days	1	Military	1931
81	The Marquess of Vega de Armijo	52 days	1	Liberal	1906
82	Nicolás Salmerón	51 days	1	PRDF	1873
83	José Giral	47 days	1	IR	1936
84	Lorenzo Arrazola	44 days	1	Moderate	1864
85	Francisco Pi y Margall	37 days	1	PRDF	1873
86	The Marquess of Irujo	23 days	1	Nonpartisan	1823
87	Florencio García Goyena	22 days	1	Moderate	1847
88	Valentín Ferraz	16 days	1	Progressive	1840
89	Modesto Cortázar	13 days	1	Progressive	1840
89	Víctor Damián Sáez	13 days	1	Nonpartisan	1823
91	Miguel Ricardo de Álava	11 days	1	Progressive	1835
91	The Marquess of Havana	11 days	1	Moderate	1868
91	Torcuato Fernández-Miranda	11 days	1	National Movement	1973
94	Joaquín María Ferrer	10 days	1	Progressive	1841
95	Salustiano de Olózaga	9 days	1	Progressive	1843
96	Juan Bautista Topete	8 days	1	Liberal Union	1870
97	Vicente Sancho	5 days	1	Progressive	1840
98	Augusto Barcía Trelles	3 days	1	IR	1936
99	Fernando de Santiago	2 days	1	National Movement	1976
100	The Count of Clonard	1 day	1	Moderate	1849
100	The Duke of Rivas	1 day	1	Moderate	1854
100	The Marquess of Mendigorría	1 day	1	Moderate	1854

== See also ==
- List of prime ministers of Spain
- Prime Minister of Spain
- List of Spanish monarchs
- List of heads of state of Spain
- President of the Republic (Spain)
- List of Spanish regents
