= Felipe Rivero y Lemoine =

19th century politician, minister, military leader and colonial governor of Santo Domingo

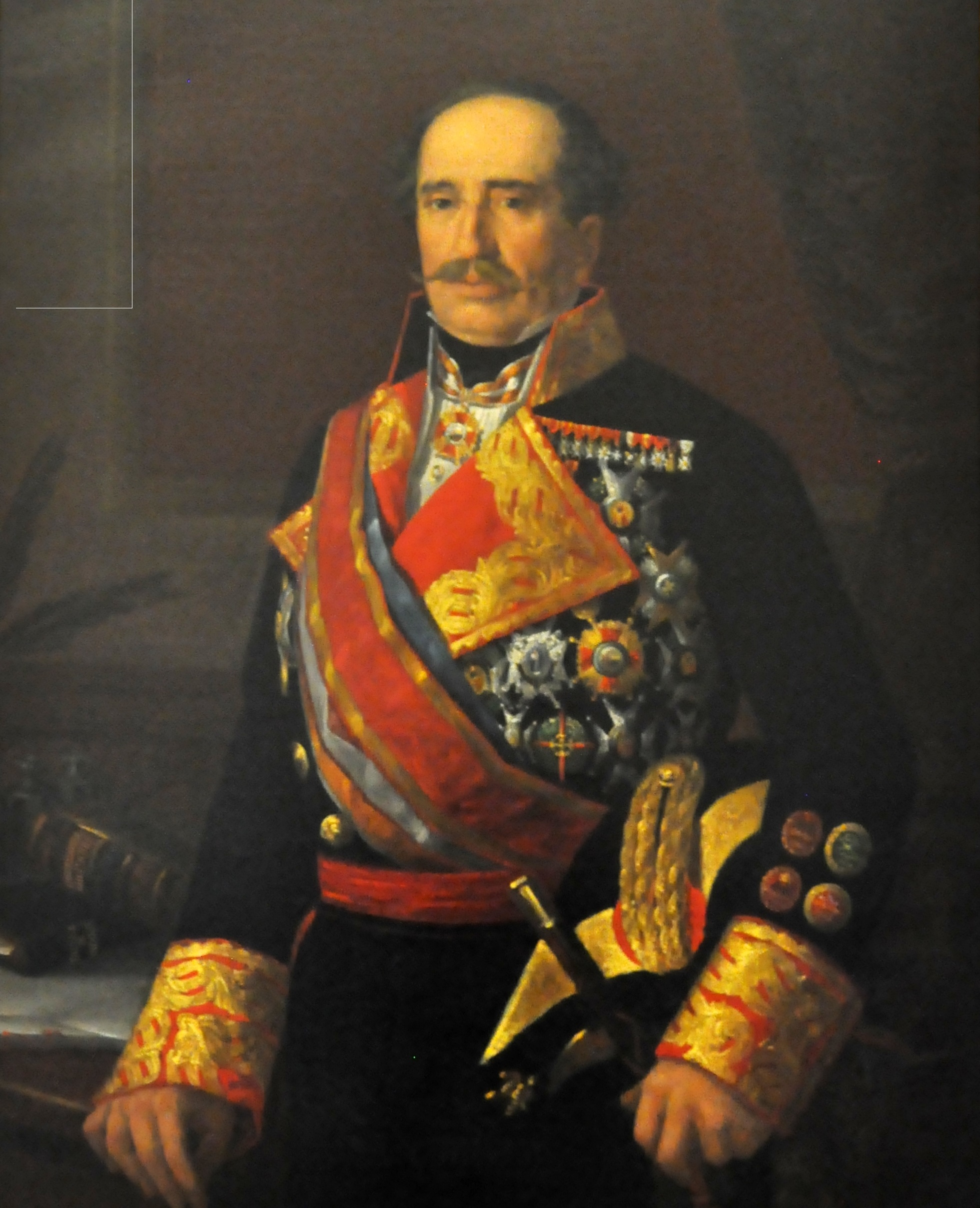

Minister of War of Spain
- In office 30 March – 21 June 1865
- Monarch: Isabella II
- Prime Minister: Ramón María Narváez
- Preceded by: Fernando Fernández de Córdoba
- Succeeded by: Leopoldo O'Donnell

Viceroy of Navarre
- In office 7 January – 15 December 1840
- Monarch: Isabella II
- Regent: Maria Christina of the Two Sicilies; Baldomero Espartero
- Prime Minister: Evaristo Pérez de Castro; Antonio González; Valentín Ferraz; Modesto Cortázar (as interim); Vicente Sancho; Baldomero Espartero
- Preceded by: Diego de León, 1st Count of Belascoáin
- Succeeded by: function abolished

Governor of the Captaincy General of Santo Domingo
- In office 20 July 1862 – 24 September 1863
- Monarch: Isabella II
- Prime Minister: Leopoldo O'Donnell; Manuel de Pando y Fernández de Pinedo
- Minister of Overseas: Leopoldo O'Donnell; José Gutiérrez de la Concha; Manuel Moreno; Francisco Permanyer Tuyets
- Preceded by: Pedro Santana
- Succeeded by: Carlos de Vargas

Personal details
- Born: 30 April 1797 La Plata, Upper Peru, Viceroyalty of the Río de la Plata
- Died: 9 August 1873 (aged 76) Madrid, Spanish Empire

José Felipe Rivero y Lemoine (30 April 1797 – 8 September 1873) was a Spanish politician, governor, minister and military leader who participated in the Battle of Ayacucho and held important public positions in Spain. He was the last Viceroy of Navarra and the first Spanish governor of the Captaincy General of Santo Domingo since 1801.

== Biography ==
He was born in the city of La Plata into a family belonging to the Upper-Peruvian nobility. He was the son of the doctor of laws Juan Francisco Rivera Vieyra, a native of Buenos Aires, and Bárbara Lemoine de Villavicencio, a native of Chuquisaca and daughter of the maestre de campo Juan Bautista de Lemoine. His father served as subdelegate governor and was also a lieutenant colonel of the militias. In 1810, due to the separatist insurrections, his family emigrated to the province of Puno. He entered, together with his siblings, the Ejército Real del Perú, and in 1812 he was admitted as a cadet in the battalion Ligero del Centro, an infantry corps in which he would carry out his entire military career in Peru and in which in 1824 he would reach the rank of commander and chief of the same in replacement of the Colonel Baldomero Espartero whom the viceroy had sent on commission to Spain. At the command of this body he fought with distinction in the Battle of Ayacucho.

After the royalist defeat and the loss of Peru, he headed to the Iberian Peninsula in the company of his former chief Espartero. He remained in the peninsula until 1828 when he returned to active service. In 1831 he was promoted to colonel and during the First Carlist War he was promoted to lieutenant general.

=== First Carlist War ===
In November 1836 he signed orders as Secretario de Estado y del Despacho de la Guerra (Secretary of State and of the War Office).

In 1838 he had been appointed General Commander of the Royal Infantry Guard, and then successively Captain General of the eighth District, of Aragon, of Old Castile and Andalusia, being also elected senator. In 1862 he was appointed Governor and Captain General of the Province of Santo Domingo, which had recently been reannexed by Spain the previous year. He was in office until the following year. Upon his return to the peninsula, he served as President of the Supreme Court of War and Navy, and President of the Supreme Council of War, a position that he would hold until his death on 8 September 1873. He was decorated with the great crosses of Isabel la Católica, Carlos III, San Fernando and San Hermenegildo.

His brother José Claudio, also a former royalist officer but who chose to remain in the new Republic of Bolivia, married the only daughter of the absolutist General Pedro Antonio Olañeta, with whom he had numerous children.
