= Francisco Armero, 1st Marquess of Nervión =

Spanish Captain general of the Navy and politician

The Most Excellent The Marquis of Nervión
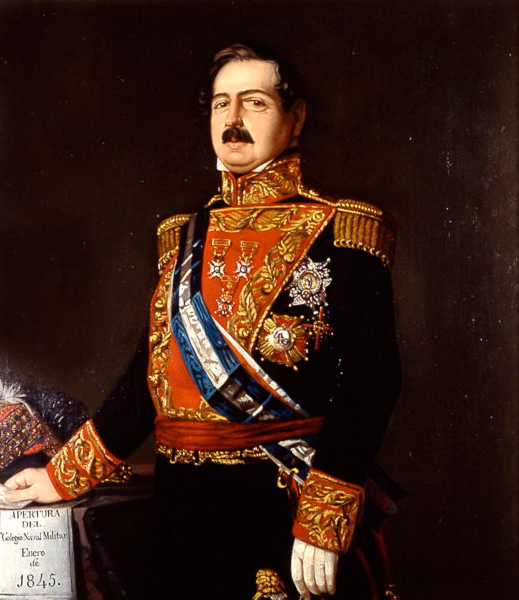

Prime Minister of Spain
- In office 15 October 1857 – 14 January 1858
- Monarch: Isabella II
- Preceded by: Ramon Maria Narvaez
- Succeeded by: Francisco Javier Isturiz

Minister of Governance of Spain
- Interim
- In office 15 October – 25 October 1857
- Monarch: Isabella II
- Prime Minister: Himself
- Preceded by: Cándido Nocedal
- Succeeded by: Manuel Bermúdez de Castro y Díez

Minister of War of Spain
- Interim
- In office 5 April – 12 April 1846
- Monarch: Isabella II
- Prime Minister: Francisco Javier de Istúriz
- Preceded by: Ramón María Narváez
- Succeeded by: José Laureano Sanz
- In office 15 October 1857 – 14 January 1858
- Monarch: Isabella II
- Prime Minister: Himself
- Preceded by: Francisco de Paula Figueras
- Succeeded by: Fermín de Ezpeleta

Minister of the Navy, Commerce and Overseas Governance of Spain
- In office 18 July – 11 September 1840
- Monarch: Isabella II
- Prime Minister: Evaristo Pérez de Castro; Antonio González; Valentín Ferraz; Modesto Cortázar (as interim)
- Preceded by: Juan de Dios Sotelo Machín
- Succeeded by: Dionosio Capaz Rendón
- In office 3 May 1844 – 12 February 1846
- Monarch: Isabella II
- Prime Minister: Ramón María Narváez
- Preceded by: José Filiberto Portillo
- Succeeded by: Juan Bautista Topete y Viaña
- In office 5 April 1846 – 28 April 1847
- Monarch: Isabella II
- Prime Minister: Francisco Javier de Istúriz
- Preceded by: Jorge Pérez Lasso de la Vega
- Succeeded by: José Baldasano (as minister of the Navy and Overseas Governance)

Minister of the Navy of Spain
- In office 2 June 1851 – 3 May 1852
- Monarch: Isabella II
- Prime Minister: Juan Bravo Murillo
- Preceded by: José María Bustillo Barreda
- Succeeded by: Casimiro Vigodet Guernica
- In office 16 September 1864 – 21 June 1865
- Monarch: Isabella II
- Prime Minister: Ramón María Narváez
- Preceded by: José Pareja Septién
- Succeeded by: Juan Zavala de la Puente

Personal details
- Born: Francisco Armero y Fernández de Peñaranda

Francisco Armero y Fernández de Peñaranda (3 May 1804, in Fuentes de Andalucía – 1 July 1866, in Seville), Marquis of Nervión and Grandee of Spain was a Spanish Captain general of the Navy and politician.

== Life ==
He entered the Navy aged 16 and fought in the Battle of Trocadero (1823), Peruvian War of Independence (1824) and First Carlist War (1834–1840).

In 1840, he became for the first time Minister of the Navy, Commerce and Colonies under Prime Ministers Antonio González González, Valentín Ferraz y Barrau and Modesto Cortázar until 11 September 1840. Four years later, he became again Minister of the Navy, Commerce and Colonies in the Ramón María Narváez cabinet between 3 May 1844 and 12 February 1846, and again between 5 April 1846 and 28 January 1847 in the Francesco Xavier de Isturiz cabinet. He also held the post of Minister of War for a few days in April 1846.
He became for a fourth time Minister of the Navy between 2 June 1851 and 3 May 1852 under Juan Bravo Murillo.

Finally, he became Prime Minister himself on 15 October 1857. His cabinet held out until 14 January 1858, in which he also held the posts of Minister of the Interior and Minister of War.

On 22 February 1862 he received the title of Marqués de Nervión, and on 13 February 13, 1856 Captain general of the Navy. But before that, he had served a fifth term as Minister of the Navy between 16 September 1864 and 21 Juny 1865 under Ramón María Narváez.

== Sources ==
- Biography (Spanish)
- "Don Francisco Armero", in: El Museo Universal, S. 251–252 (PDF; 792 kB)
- Cabinets under Isabella II. (1833–1843 - Les Regències)
- Cabinets under Isabella II. (1843–1856 - Década Moderada)
- Cabinets under Isabella II. (1856–1868 - La Unión Liberal)
