= Joaquín Francisco Pacheco =

Spanish politician and writer (1808–1865)

The Most Excellent Joaquín Francisco Pacheco
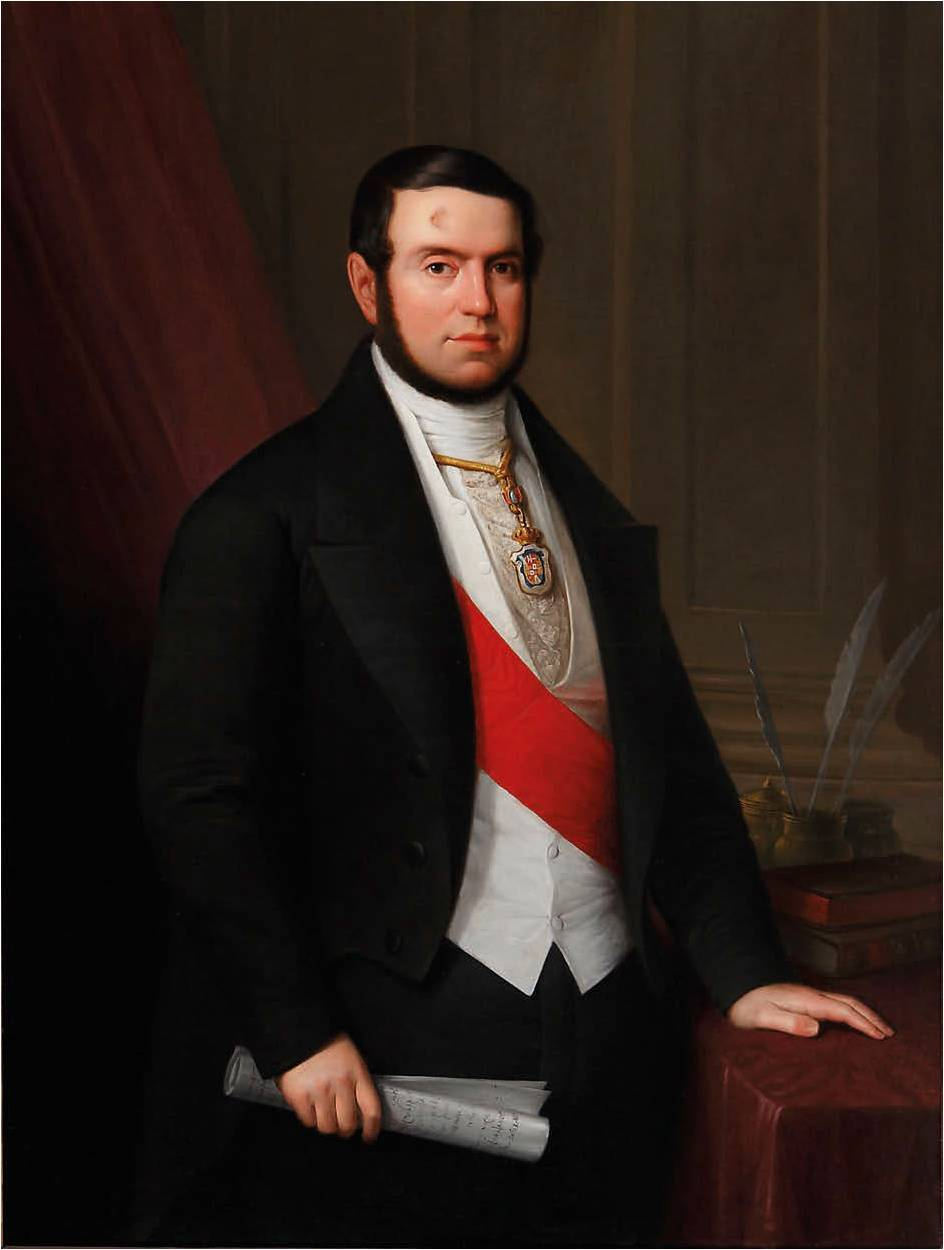
- Portrait by Antonio María Esquivel

Prime Minister of Spain
- In office 28 March 1847 – 12 September 1847
- Monarch: Isabella II
- Preceded by: Carlos Martínez de Irujo
- Succeeded by: Florencio García Goyena

Prosecutor of the Supreme Court
- In office 29 July 1843 – 2 July 1844
- Preceded by: Eugenio Manuel Cuervo & Pío Laborda
- Succeeded by: Pedro Jiménez Navarro
- In office 14 January 1845 – 28 March 1847
- Preceded by: Pedro Jiménez Navarro
- Succeeded by: Lorenzo Arrazola y García

Seat b of the Real Academia Española
- In office 1847 – 8 October 1865
- Preceded by: Seat established
- Succeeded by: José Selgas

Personal details
- Born: Joaquín Francisco Pacheco y Gutiérrez-Calderón; 22 February 1808 Écija, Spain
- Died: 8 October 1865 (aged 57) Madrid, Spain
- Party: Moderate Party
- Education: University of Seville; Asunción College

Don Joaquín Francisco Pacheco y Gutiérrez-Calderón (22 February 1808 – 8 October 1865) also known as El Pontífice (The Pontiff), was a Spanish politician and writer who served as Prime Minister of Spain in 1847 and held other important offices such as Minister of State. He was also Prosecutor General of Spain.

== Biography ==
=== Early life ===
On 22 February 1808, Pacheco was born in Écija as son to a notary of the city council. He studied humanities at Asunción College in Córdoba and in 1823 went to the University of Seville, where he studied jurisprudence, obtaining his bachelor’s degree in law in 1829. There developed a lifelong friendship with fellow student, Juan Donoso Cortés. They both frequented the political and literary circles.

=== Journalism ===
In 1832, he moved to Madrid working as a lawyer. It was at this time he had literary and journalistic inclinations, founding the newspaper La Abeja in 1834. He used the platform as a way to express views of moderantismo. He also collaborated with other newspapers such as El Artista and El Español.

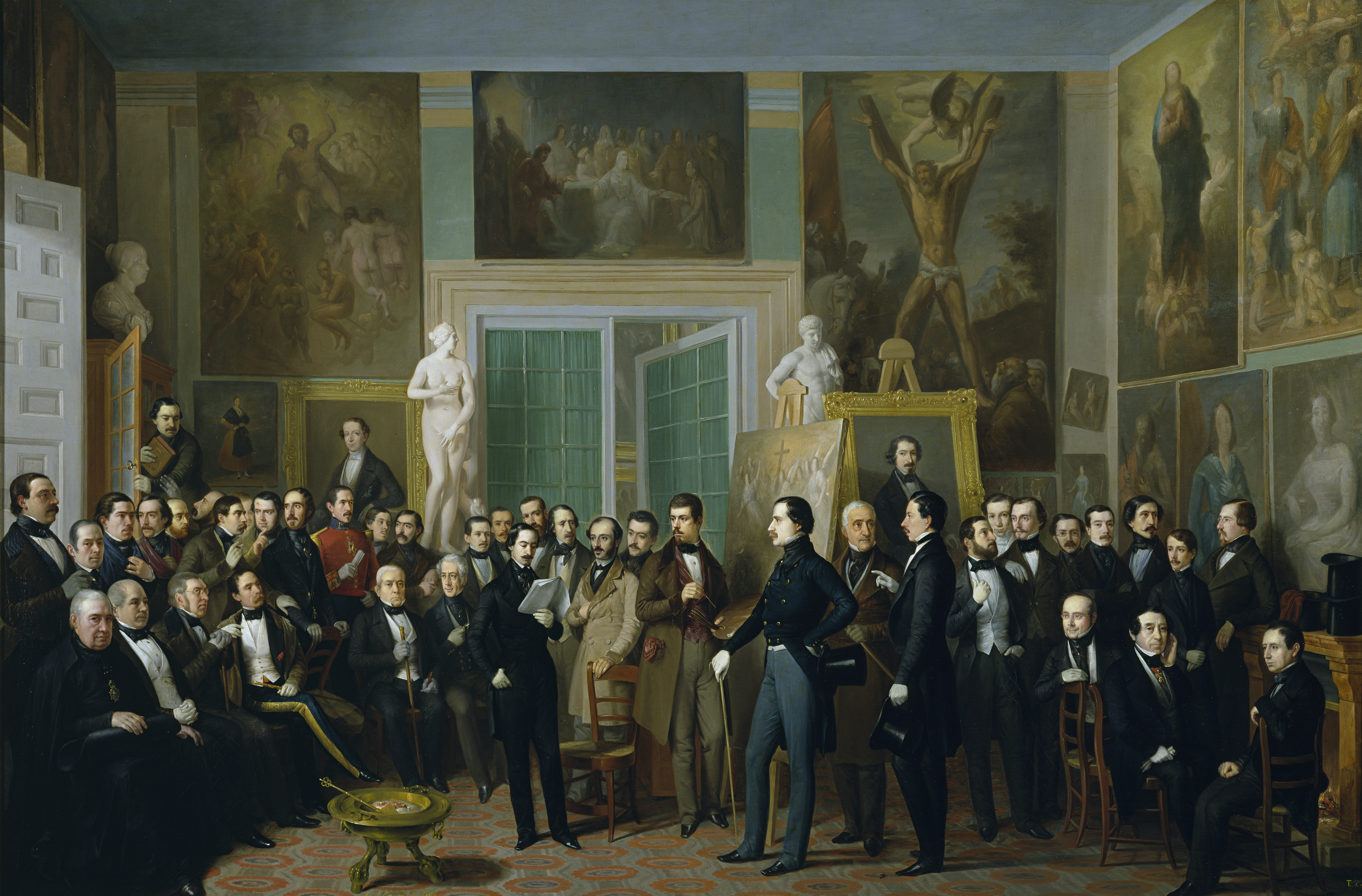
Pacheco portrayed in Los Poetas contemporáneos by Antonio María Esquivel, 1846

In the world of law, with Juan Bravo Murillo, he founded El Boletín de Jurisprudencia y Legislación. In 1844, he held the chair of Constitutional Political Law at the Ateneo de Madrid, previously holding those of Legislation (1836–1838) and Criminal Law (1839–1840).

=== Political career ===
Pacheco was a liberal, being a member of the Moderate Party since 1834, and in 1840 declaring before parliament,

There are, gentlemen, needs that come with the times: nothing in the world is permanent. Time is progressive, more so than men: human things are continually running, pulled forward by social progress, and cannot be restrained.

From 1837 to 1858, he held a seat in the Congress of Deputies, representing the Province of Córdoba. In 1858, he was elected senator.

On 28 March 1847, he was appointed prime minister, a position he held for 5 months. His management was limited to retaining office as the Cortes Generales held an opposing majority and he received the animosity of the king consort, Francisco de Asis as well as the royal clique. He returned to the Spanish Government as Minister of State, with Baldomero Espartero in 1854, and Alejandro Mon in 1864.

He served as ambassador to Mexico from 1860 until his expulsion in January 1861. Upon his arrival in Veracruz City, he traveled to Mexico City, at the time occupied by Miguel Miramón, to present his status. He recognized Miramón, lending him prestige. Public opinion was negative towards Pacheco and when the capital returned to federal forces in 1861, he received an order of expulsion, certified by Benito Juárez, from the Secretary of State and Foreign Relations on 12 January.

His excellency the constitutional president ad interim cannot regard you but as one of the enemies of his government for the services you have rendered in favor of the rebel usurpers who have occupied this city for the past three years. For this he orders that you depart from this and the republic without further delay than may be strictly necessary to prepare and make your journey. As all other friendly nations, his excellency the president respects Spain, but your sojourn in the republic cannot longer continue. The consideration which moves his excellency to this resolution is therefore entirely personal.

— Romero Ocampo

He was also ambassador to London (1856), Rome (1854 and 1864), as well as France, prosecutor of the Supreme Court (1843 and 1847), a member of the Royal Spanish Academy, Royal Academy of History, Royal Academy of Moral and Political Sciences, and the Royal Academy of Fine Arts. He was elected president of the Royal Academy of Jurisprudence and Legislation, as well as the Royal Academy of Fine Arts in 1865, being unable to serve in the latter case.

On 8 October 1865, Pacheco died as a part of the 1863–1875 cholera pandemic.

== Works ==
=== Poems ===
- Catón (1828)
- A la señora doña... (1831)
- Oda a la amnistía (1833), a neoclassical poem
- Una noche (1833)
- Meditación (1834)

=== Travel Book ===
- Italia (1857)

=== Theater ===
- Alfredo (1835), a romantic drama
- Los Infantes de Lara (1836), a historical drama
- Bernardo del Carpio (1848), a drama

=== History ===
- “Historia de las Cortes de 1837” (1839), in Madrid Magazine

Political offices
Preceded by The Duke of Sotomayor	Prime Minister of Spain; 28 March 1847 – 12 September 1847	Succeeded by Florencio García Goyena
Preceded by The Duke of Sotomayor	Minister of State; 28 March 1847 – 31 August 1847	Succeeded by Antonio Caballero
Preceded by Luis Mayans	Minister of State; 30 July 1854 – 29 November 1854	Succeeded by Claudio Antón de Luzuriaga
Preceded by Lorenzo Arrazola	Minister of State; 1 March 1864 – 16 September 1864	Succeeded by Alejandro Llorente
