= Francisco Cea Bermúdez =

Spanish politician and diplomat

The Most Excellent Francisco Cea Bermúdez
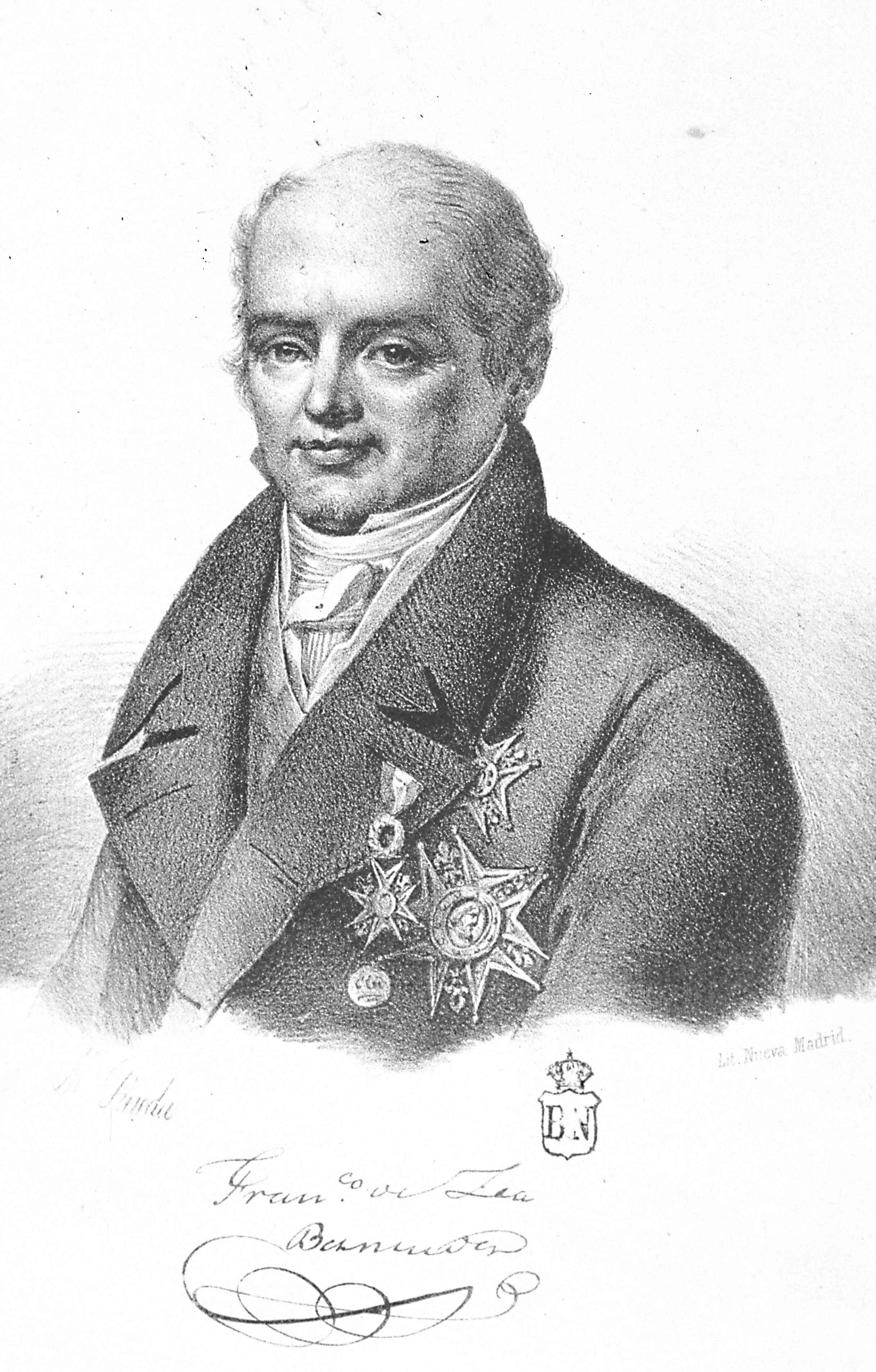

Prime Minister of Spain
- In office 29 November 1832 – 15 January 1834
- Monarchs: Ferdinand VII; Isabella II
- Succeeded by: Francisco de Paula Martínez de la Rosa

Personal details
- Born: Francisco de Paula de Cea Bermúdez y Buzo; 28 October 1779 Málaga, Spain
- Died: 6 July 1850 (aged 70) Paris, France

Francisco de Paula de Cea Bermúdez y Buzo (28 October 1779, in Málaga – 6 July 1850, in Paris) was a Spanish politician and diplomat who served twice as Prime Minister of Spain during the final decade of Ferdinand VII's reign. The First Carlist War broke out during his second premiership.

== Biography ==
A successful businessman, he was sent in 1810 by the Cortes of Cadiz to Russia, to forge an alliance against Napoleon. After the War, he was Ambassador in Constantinople (1820–1823) and London (1824). In that year he became Prime Minister for the first time, but was dominated by Francisco Calomarde, the real leader of the Cabinet. When the cabinet fell in October 1825, he became again Ambassador in Dresden (1825–1827) and London (1827–1832).

On 1 October 1832, he was recalled to become Prime Minister again, in the turbulent years when Ferdinand VII of Spain died, and the Pragmatic Sanction of 1830 came into effect, leading to the First Carlist War. He was also the architect of the 1833 territorial division of Spain.

He was deposed in January 1834 and emigrated to Paris, where he died in 1850.

However, their "third way" proved impracticable. After the Manifesto of Santarem, in which the prince Carlos María Isidro proclaimed himself king of Spain, the royalists opted to take up arms. When the First Carlist War began, Cea's offers failed to attract the liberals, who insisted on constitutional modifications. Finally, the latter, in their more moderate version, obtained the support of some courtiers (among them Miraflores), of captains general (Llauder, Quesada, Fernández de Córdova) and of the French and British embassies: Cea was replaced by the moderate liberal Francisco Martínez de la Rosa (January 15, 1834).
