= Joaquín María Ferrer y Cafranga =

Spanish politician

The Most Excellent Joaquín María Ferrer
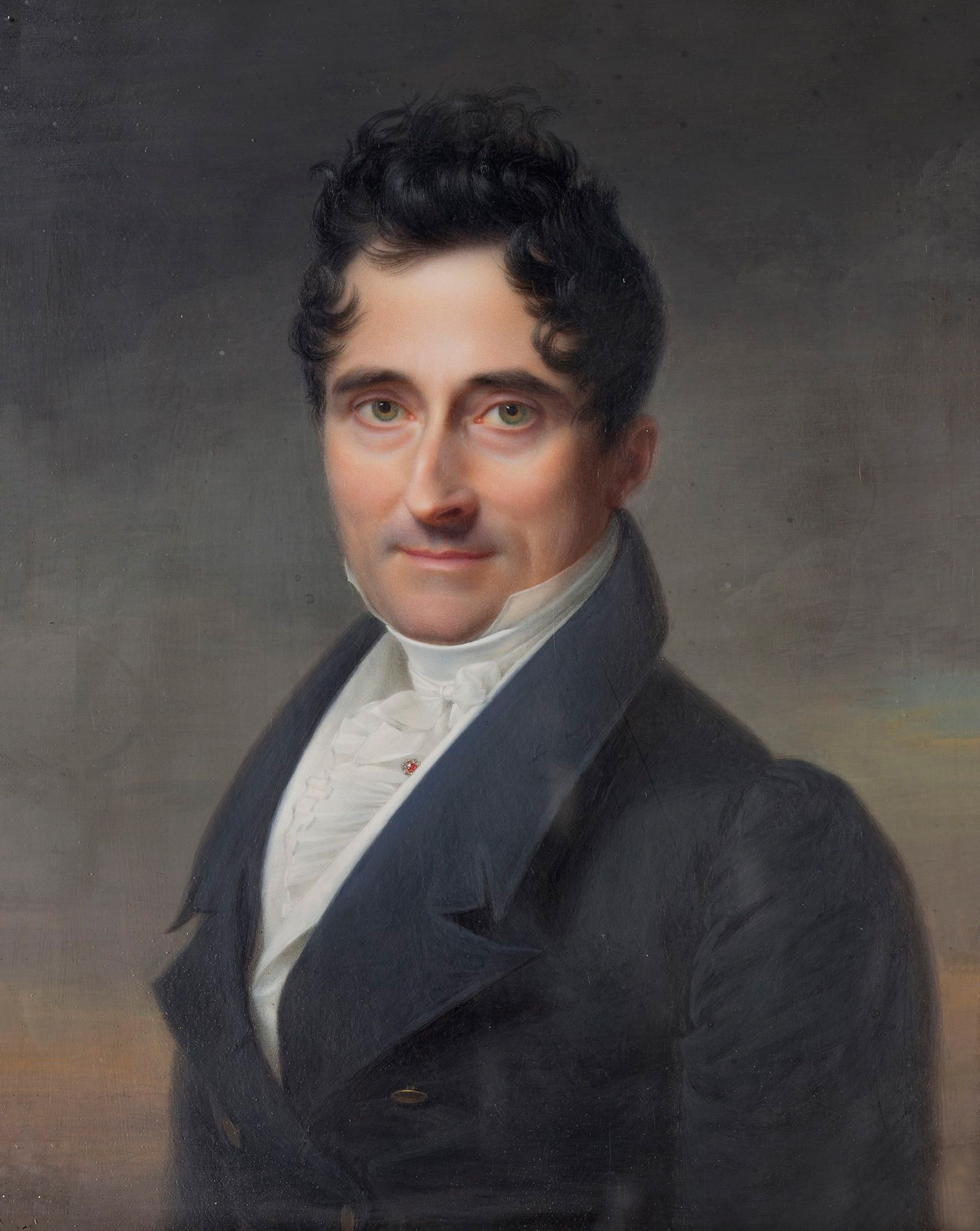
- Portrait by Jean-Baptiste Jacques Augustin, 1825

Prime Minister of Spain
- In office 10 May 1841 – 20 May 1841
- Monarch: Isabella II
- Preceded by: Baldomero Espartero
- Succeeded by: Antonio González

Personal details
- Born: Joaquín María Ferrer y Cafranga; 8 December 1777
- Died: 30 September 1861 (aged 83)

Joaquín María de Ferrer y Cafranga (8 December 1777, in Pasajes de San Pedro, Spain – 30 September 1861, in Santa Águeda, Spain) was a Spanish politician and military who served as Prime Minister of Spain in 1841, and held other important offices such as Minister of State, Mayor of Madrid and President of the Senate. He also served as Deputy Prime Minister between 1840 and 1841. He also served as a Deputy for Guipúzcoa from 1822 to 1837.

Political offices
Preceded by Vicente Sancho	Minister of State; 16 September 1840 – 20 May 1841	Succeeded by Antonio González
Preceded by The Count of Luchana	Prime Minister of Spain; 10 May 1841 – 20 May 1841	Succeeded by Antonio González
