= Vicente Sancho y Cobertores =

Spanish politician and militant

The Most Excellent Vicente Sancho
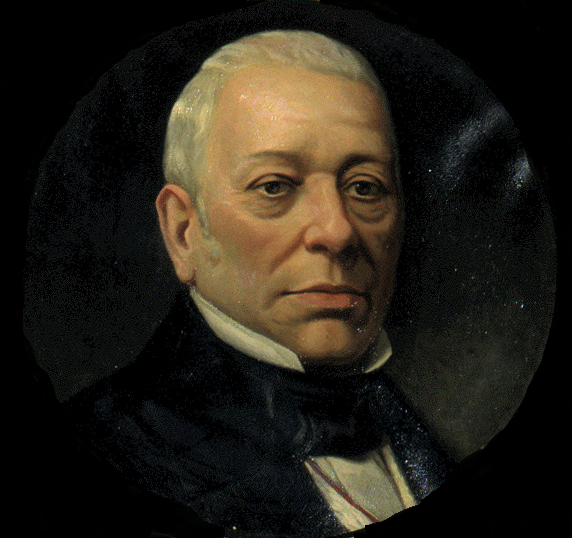

Prime Minister of Spain
- In office 11 September 1840 – 16 September 1840
- Monarch: Isabella II
- Preceded by: Modesto Cortázar
- Succeeded by: Baldomero Espartero

Personal details
- Born: Vicente Sancho y Cobertores; 5 April 1784
- Died: 29 May 1860 (aged 76) Madrid spain

Vicente Sancho y Cobertores (5 April 1784 in Petrés, Valencia, Spain – 29 May 1860 in Madrid, Spain) was a Spanish politician and militant who served as Prime Minister of Spain and Minister of State in 1840 during the reign of Queen Isabella II.

Political offices
Preceded by Valentín Ferraz	Prime Minister of Spain; 11 September 1840 – 16 September 1840	Succeeded by The Count of Luchana
Preceded by Juan Antoine	Minister of State; 11 September 1840 – 16 September 1840	Succeeded by Joaquín María de Ferrer
