= Manuel de Pando, 6th Marquis of Miraflores =

Spanish noble and politician

The Most Excellent Manuel de Pando 6th Marquis of Miraflores GE
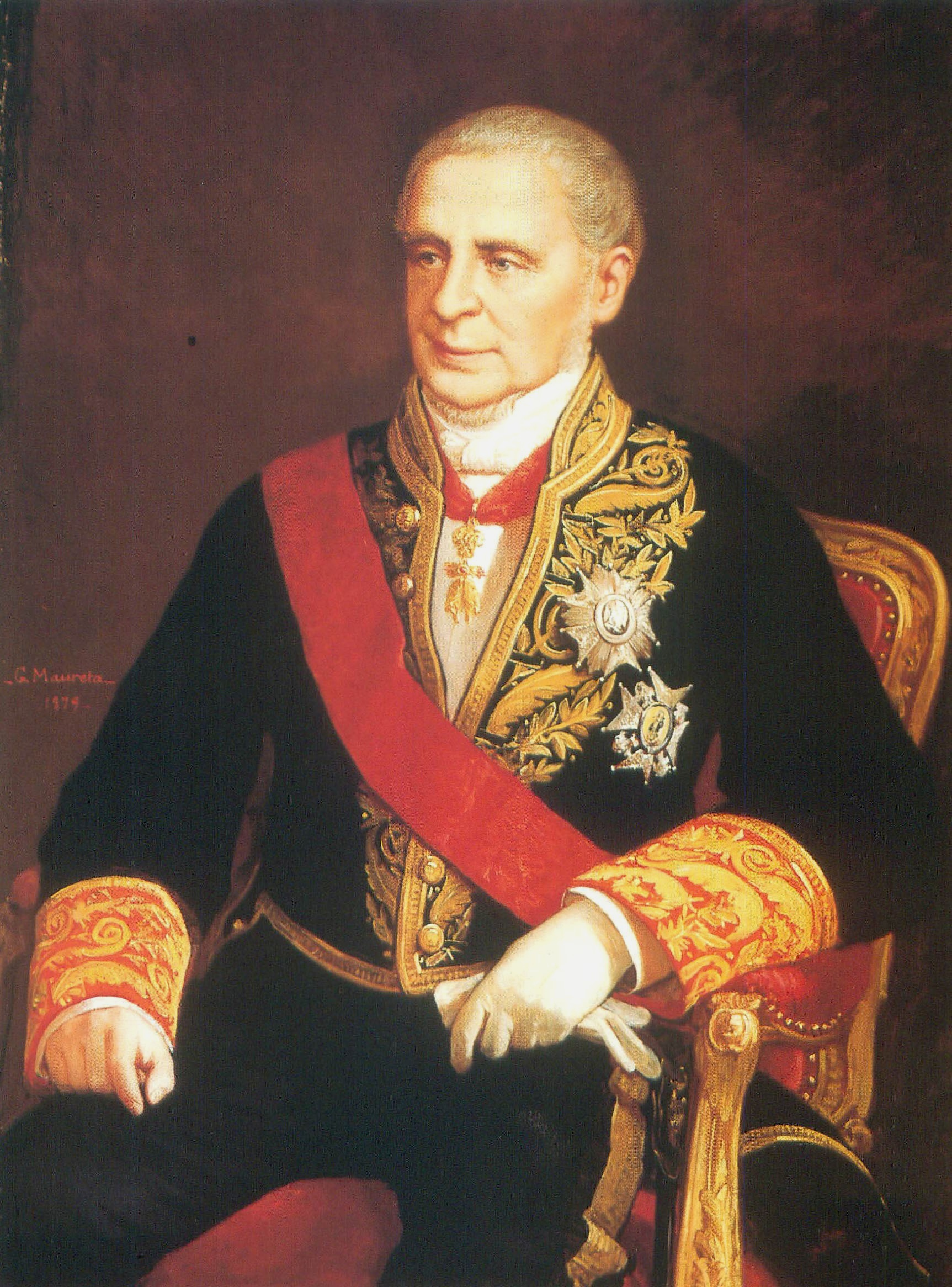

Prime Minister of Spain
- In office 2 March 1863 – 17 January 1864
- Monarch: Isabella II
- Preceded by: The Duke of Tetuán
- Succeeded by: Lorenzo Arrazola
- In office 12 February 1846 – 16 March 1846
- Preceded by: The Duke of Valencia
- Succeeded by: The Duke of Valencia

Personal details
- Born: Manuel de Pando y Fernández de Pinedo; 22 December 1792 Madrid, Spain
- Died: 20 February 1872 (aged 79) Madrid, Spain
- Party: Moderate Party
- Occupation: Diplomat and politician

Manuel de Pando y Fernández de Pinedo, 6th Marquis of Miraflores, 4th Count of la Ventosa, GE (23 December 1790 – 20 February 1872) was a Spanish noble and politician, who served two times as Prime Minister of Spain and held other important political office such as Minister of State and President of the Senate.

== Biography ==
Pando was born in Madrid. After studying agriculture and industry, he took part in the Dos de Mayo Uprising during the War of Spanish Independence. Later, he had to flee, together with his family, to Cádiz. After the accession to the throne of Ferdinand VII of Spain, the latter's uncle, Infante Antonio Pascual of Spain asked Pando for advice on the writing of the Memorial of Miraflores, which aimed to solve the situation after the end of the French domination in Spain.

In 1820, as part of the National Militia, he took part to several actions under general Rafael Riego; he abandoned the field two years later, however, and was able to escape the persecutions of the so-called Década Ominosa (1823–1833).

Pando reappeared in public life in 1832, siding with the regent Maria Cristina of Spain and the future Isabella II. In 1834 he was named Spanish plenipotentiary at London. As a diplomat, he had a role in the signing of the alliance between Spain, France, Portugal and the United Kingdom. He subsequently returned to Spain, where he held several positions, until forced to flee to France in the wake of the Revolt of La Granja de San Ildefonso. Returned home, Pardo took part in the declaration of the constitution and in the Convention of Vergara, which substantially put an end to the First Carlist War.

On 12 February 1846, he became Minister of State. His moderately progressive program, favouring a return to morality and a general conciliation, was however, thwarted by the opposition of his predecessor, General Ramón María Narváez and by the immoral behaviour of regent Maria Cristina. Pardo resigned on 16 March, being replaced by Narváez himself. From 1845 to 1852 he was president of the Spanish Senate. After the marriage of Queen Isabella II and Francis, Duke of Cádiz, Pardo became Governor of the Royal Palace, and worked to reform its administration.

During the presidency of Juan Bravo Murillo, Pardo was Minister of State (Minister of Foreign Affairs, 1851–1852). In this role, he obtained the help of France and Britain in the defense of Cuba. In 1863, Isabella called him again as prime minister, a position he held until 1864; afterwards, he was again President of the Senate from 1866 to 1867.

He died in Madrid, Spain, in 1872.

Political offices
| Preceded by Ramón María Narváez | Prime Minister of Spain; 12 February 1846 – 16 March 1846 | Succeeded by Ramón María Narváez |
| Preceded by Francisco de Paula Martínez de la Rosa | Minister of State; 12 February 1846 – 16 March 1846 | Succeeded by Ramón María Narváez |
| Preceded by Manuel Bertrán de Lis | Minister of State; 23 May 1851 – 7 August 1852 | Succeeded by Manuel Bertrán de Lis |
| Preceded by The Duke of Tetuan | Prime Minister of Spain; 2 March 1863 – 17 January 1864 | Succeeded by Lorenzo Arrazola |
| Preceded by The Duke of la Torre | Minister of State; 2 March 1863 – 17 January 1864 | Succeeded by Lorenzo Arrazola |
