= Florencio García Goyena =

Spanish jurist and politician

The Most Excellent Florencio García Goyena

Prime Minister of Spain
- In office 12 September 1847 – 4 October 1847
- Monarch: Isabella II
- Preceded by: Joaquin Francisco Pacheco
- Succeeded by: Ramon Maria Narvaez

Personal details
- Born: Florencio García Goyena

Florencio García Goyena (1783 in Tafalla, Navarre – 1855) was a Spanish jurist.

García Goyena studied law in Madrid and Salamanca before serving as legal counsel to the Cortes of Navarra and the governors of the provinces of Léon, Granada and Zaragoza. A liberal, he went into French exile from 1823 to 1834. Back in Spain, he served as fiscal of Burgos and as official in the provinces of Navarra, Guipúzcoa and Zaragoza. In 1835, García Goyena was appointed a judge of the appeals court in Burgos and later of the Audiencia and the Supreme Court in Madrid. In 1847 he briefly served as Minister of Justice. From 12 September to 4 October 1847, he served as Prime Minister of Spain.

He chaired a commission that produced, in 1851, a draft civil code for Spain, most of it written by García Goyena. Although the code was not adopted due to the strong opposition of leading regional families, who saw their power base threatened by the proposed harmonisation of regional inheritance and property laws, it was the basis of the codification later accomplished by Alonso Martínez in 1888/89.
