= Modesto Cortázar y Leal de Ibarra =

Spanish politician and Prime Minister

The Most Excellent Modesto Cortázar

Prime Minister of Spain
- In office 28 August 1840 – 11 September 1840
- Monarch: Isabella II
- Preceded by: Valentín Ferraz
- Succeeded by: Vicente Sancho

Personal details
- Born: Modesto Cortázar y Leal de Ibarra

Modesto Cortázar y Leal de Ibarra (15 June 1783, in Briviesca (Burgos) – 25 January 1862, in Madrid) was a Spanish politician and Prime Minister.

Cortázar was a member of the Progressive Party in Spain.

When the government of Valentín Ferraz y Barrau fell on 28 August 1840, he was appointed by Regent María Cristina de Borbón to form a government in which he became acting Prime Minister and also held the post of Minister of Justice. After 2 weeks, he was replaced by Vicente Sancho y Cobertores.

During the Década Moderada, he became in January 1847 President of the Congress of Deputies and in September 1847 Foreign minister in the cabinet of Florencio García Goyena.
