= Evaristo Pérez de Castro =

Spanish politician and diplomat

The Most Excellent Evaristo Pérez de Castro
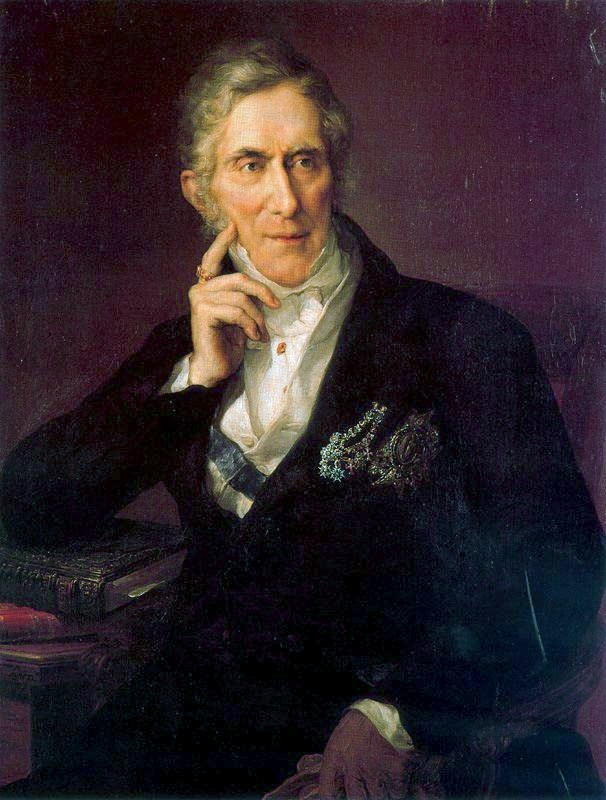

Prime Minister of Spain
- In office 9 December 1838 – 20 July 1840
- Monarch: Isabella II
- Preceded by: Bernardino Fernández de Velasco
- Succeeded by: 1st Marquis of Valdeterrazo

Personal details
- Born: 26 October 1769 Valladolid, Spain
- Died: 28 November 1849 (aged 80) Madrid
- Party: Realista Moderado

Evaristo Pérez de Castro y Colomera (26 October 1769, in Valladolid – 28 November 1849, in Madrid) was a Spanish politician and diplomat who served as Prime Minister of Spain from 3 February 1839 to 18 July 1840, and held other important offices such as Minister of State.

He was a Hero of the Kingdom from 1834 to 1836, a senator for the province of Valladolid from 1840 to 1841, and senator for life from 1845 until his death.

Political offices
Preceded by The Duke of Frías	Prime Minister of Spain; 3 February 1839 – 20 July 1840	Succeeded by Antonio González
Preceded by The Duke of Frías	Minister of State; 3 February 1839 – 19 July 1840	Succeeded by José del Castillo; Acting
