= Antonio González, 1st Marquis of Valdeterrazo =

Spanish politician, diplomat and lawyer

The Most Excellent The Marquis of Valdeterrazo
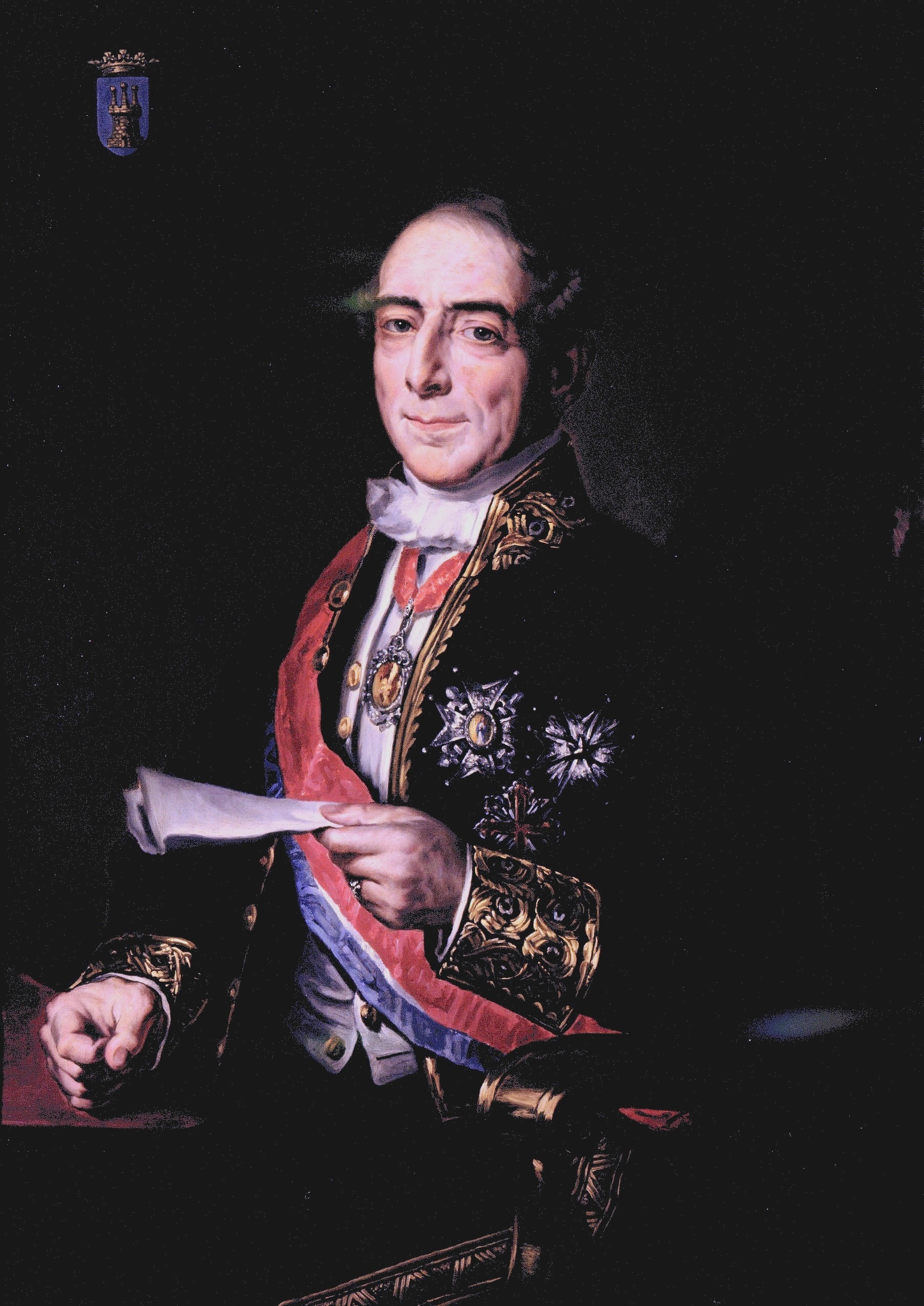

Prime Minister of Spain
- In office 20 July 1840 – 12 August 1840
- Monarch: Isabella II
- Preceded by: Evaristo Pérez de Castro
- Succeeded by: Valentín Ferraz
- In office 20 May 1841 – 17 June 1842
- Monarch: Isabella II
- Preceded by: Joaquín María de Ferrer
- Succeeded by: The Marquess of Rodil

Personal details
- Born: 5 January 1792 Valencia del Mombuey, Spain
- Died: 30 November 1876 (aged 84) Madrid
- Party: Progressive

Don Antonio González y González, 1st Marquis of Valdeterrazo (January 5, 1792 in Valencia del Mombuey, Spain – November 30, 1876 in Madrid, Spain) was a Spanish politician, diplomat and lawyer who served two times as Prime Minister of Spain in the reign of Isabella II, and was also President of the Congress of Deputies. He was also the senator for Huelva from 1837 to 1839, then senator for life from 1847 to 1868, and finally senator for Almeria during 1876.

Political offices
Preceded by Evaristo Pérez de Castro	Prime Minister of Spain; 20 July 1840 – 12 August 1840	Succeeded by Valentín Ferraz
Preceded by Joaquín María de Ferrer	Prime Minister of Spain; 20 May 1841 – 17 June 1842	Succeeded by The Marquess of Rodil
Preceded by Joaquín María de Ferrer	Minister of State; 20 May 1841 – 17 June 1842	Succeeded by The Count of Almodóvar
