= Valentín Ferraz y Barrau =

Spanish military commander and politician

The Most Excellent Valentín Ferraz
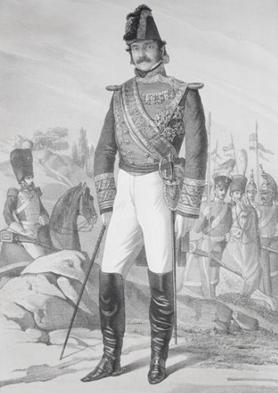

Prime Minister of Spain
- In office 12 August 1840 – 28 August 1840
- Monarch: Isabella II
- Preceded by: Antonio González
- Succeeded by: Modesto Cortázar

Personal details
- Born: Valentín Ferraz y Barrau; 17 February 1792 Huesca, Spain
- Died: 31 August 1866 (aged 74) Madrid, Spain

Valentín Ferraz y Barrau (Huesca, Spain, 1792 – Madrid, Spain, 1866) was a Spanish military commander and politician. After fighting in the Peninsular War and in the Peruvian War of Independence Valentín engaged in the chaotic politics of the post-war reign of Isabella II of Spain, serving as Prime Minister of Spain in 1840 and holding other important offices such as Mayor of Madrid.

Born into a noble family established in the twelfth century around the Benasque Valley, Huesca, the family produced several illustrious clerics, politicians, lawyers and military strategists. He was the nephew of Antonio Cornel y Ferraz, the Spanish Minister of War for Charles IV of Spain and first cousin of Jose Ferraz y Cornel, Spanish Minister of Finance For Queen Isabella in 1840, and Francisco Javier Ferraz y Cornel, Lieutenant General and Chief Military Justice, also during the reign of Isabella II.

== Spanish War of Independence ==
In 1808, as a cadet in the King's Dragoon Regiment in the city of Zaragoza at the beginning of the second phase of the Napoleonic invasion, Valentín was captured after the surrender of the city following two months of fierce fighting in the streets. However he managed to escape and rejoin the Spanish army which exploit earned him promotion to lieutenant in 1809. That same year he fought in the campaign of Valencia, then threatened by the French army of Marshal Louis Gabriel Suchet. He engaged in constant battles and skirmishes that took place until the fall of the city of Valencia to the French, but a combination of fortuitous invents were to follow. First, the withdrawal of most French troops from Spain to reinforce Napoleon's Russian campaign and then the offensive of the Duke of Wellington was launched from Portugal. These factors helped the Allies to expel the French from Spain.

The regiment of Ferraz was deployed the fields of La Mancha (south of Madrid) where he distinguished himself in the fighting that preceded the ultimate French expulsion and the signing of the eventual peace treaty. After the war he held the military field rank of Captain (Teniente in Spanish), and requested a posting to South America where the royal armies faced the Peruvian separatists.

== Peruvian War of Independence ==
In 1815 Valentín was assigned to the regiment Cazadores del Rey, (Royal Hunters) which had been intended for action overseas and was sent to Peru in order to form the escort of the new General in Chief of the Army of Upper Peru, Brigadier José de la Serna, in whose company he embarked from Cadiz on 8 May 1816 aboard the frigate La Vengeance. As Captain in command of 4 officers and 46 soldiers, his regiment landed in the Peruvian port of Arica on 8 September of the same year. There they collected the horses and supplies needed for the campaign, and proceeded to the front-line of the war zone to join the royal army of Upper Peru in its barracks Santiago de Cotagaita, on the basis of the European troops would, in 1817 form a squad of Grenadier Guards of 78 men commanded by Ferraz. He mounted campaigns in Tarija, Jujuy Province and Salta Province, recovering for the Spanish Crown those territories that had been occupied by the Argentine independence movement.

The outstanding performance of Ferraz troops converted their mission from one of escort detail to a front-line regiment which came to have four squadrons with two beater and two shooter companies totalling some 600 men. His skills as a cavalry officer and his willingness to command was noted in dispatches.

The regiment would not have the opportunity to participate in the battle on the shores of Lake Junín, because the Upper Peru army revolted at Olaneta, which forced the Spanish viceroy to send Ferraz to reinforce the southern army under the command of Valdés. The campaign was a disaster and had to be abandoned. The troops returned to Cusco where the viceroy gathered his army for the final battle against Sucre. The Capitulation of Ayacucho is the treaty signed by the Spanish Chief of Staff José de Canterac and General Antonio José de Sucre after the battle of that name on December 9, 1824, which gave birth to an independent Peru. Ferraz embarked for the Iberian Peninsula accompanied by a few subordinates with whom he had come to Peru nine years ago.

== Return to Spain ==
Valentín returned to Spain in 1825, and boosted his career under the tutelage of General Baldomero Espartero, rising through the ranks to the highest institutions, but always faithful to his liberal ideas. His titles included: Lieutenant General of the Armies, General Manager Gun Cavalry, inspector general of the National Militia, member of advisory boards for foreign wars, Congressman and Senator of the Spanish Kingdom representing the province of Huesca, Mayor of Madrid, War Minister four times and President of the Council of Ministers in the last weeks of the regency of María Cristina de Borbón.

Especially noteworthy in this period is when he led the Directorate General of Cavalry. During this time, he also founded an enduring Academy for Weaponry in Alcalá de Henares which earned him the nickname of Spanish Cavalry Regenerator.

In 1865, a year before his death, Madrid's San Marcial Street (which runs between the central Plaza de España (Madrid) and Paseo Moret) was renamed calle Valentín Ferraz, in his honour, and remains so today. In house number 70 in this street in 1925 the founder of the Spanish Socialist Workers Party, Pablo Iglesias was to die. The building now serves as the principal political training facility and bears the name of Valentín as a mark of respect for his service to Spain.
