= Pedro José Pidal =

Spanish lawyer, writer, politician and academician

The Most Excellent Pedro José Pidal 1st Marquis of Pidal
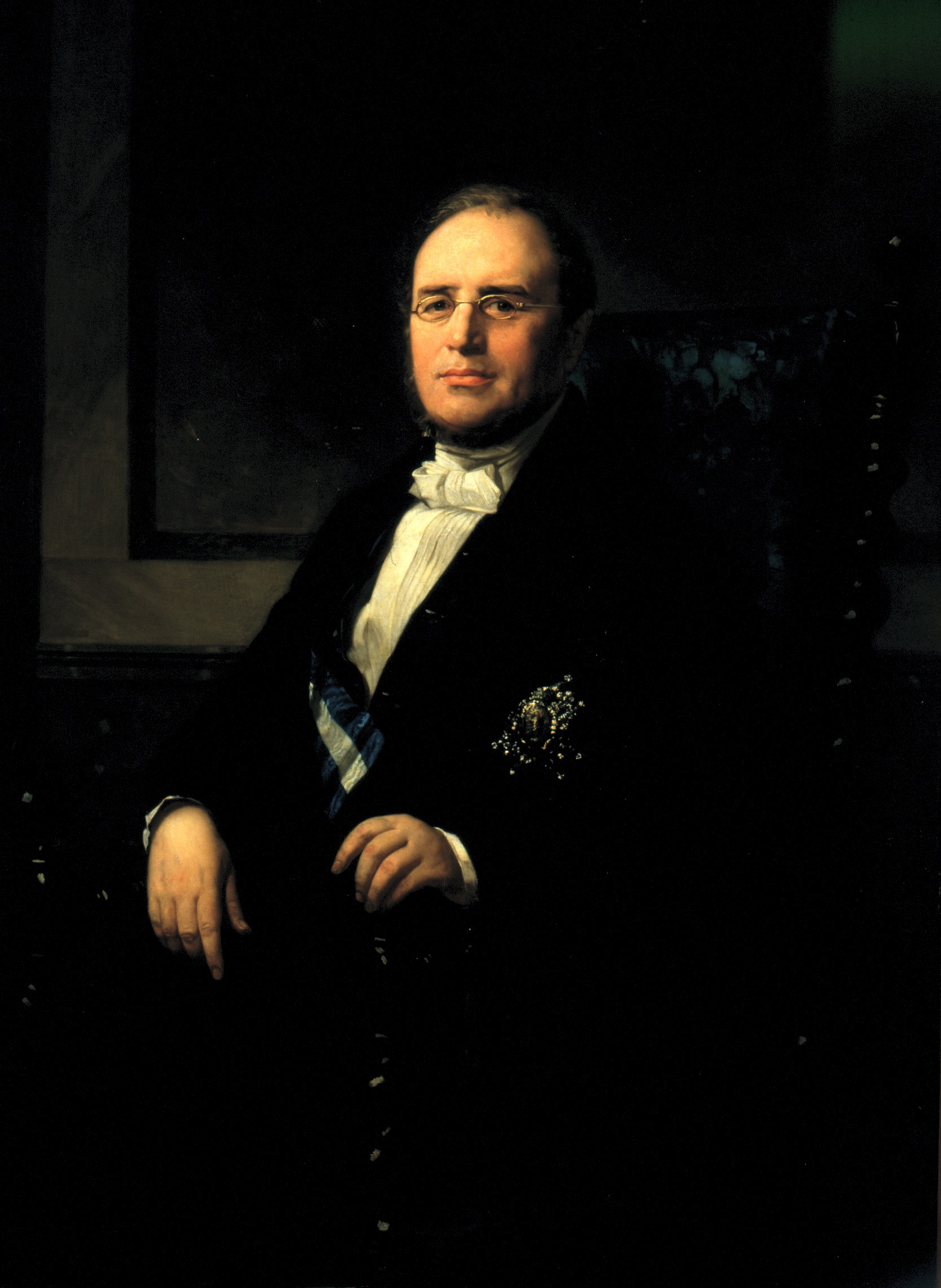
- Official portrait by Dióscoro Puebla (1877). Congress of Deputies.

99th President of the Congress of Deputies
- In office 27 November 1843 – 4 July 1844
- Preceded by: Salustiano de Olózaga y Almandoz
- Succeeded by: Francisco Castro y Orozco

Ministry of Governance
- In office 3 May 1844 – 12 February 1846
- Preceded by: José Justiniani Ramírez de Arellano
- Succeeded by: Francisco Javier de Istúriz
- In office 5 April 1846 – 28 January 1847
- Preceded by: Javier de Burgos
- Succeeded by: Manuel Seijas Lozano

Minister of State
- In office 29 July 1848 – 19 October 1849
- Preceded by: Carlos Martínez de Irujo
- Succeeded by: Salvador Cea Bermúdez
- In office 20 October 1849 – 14 January 1851
- Preceded by: Salvador Cea Bermúdez
- Succeeded by: Manuel Bertrán de Lis y Ribes
- In office 12 October 1856 – 15 October 1857
- Preceded by: Nicomedes Pastor Díaz y Corbelle
- Succeeded by: Leopoldo Augusto de Cueto

Seat g of the Real Academia Española
- In office 25 February 1847 – 28 December 1865
- Preceded by: Seat established
- Succeeded by: Antonio Aparisi Guijarro (Note: Aparisi was elected for the position in 1866 but never took the seat)

Personal details
- Born: Pedro José Pidal y Carniado; 25 November 1799 Villaviciosa, Spain
- Died: 28 December 1865 (aged 66) Madrid, Spain

Pedro José Pidal y Carniado, 1st Marquis of Pidal (25 November 1799 – 28 December 1865) was a Spanish lawyer, writer, politician (alcalde, (Note: Not to be confused with the modern term, meaning mayor. With duties similar to those of the corregidor, the main difference being that the corregidor was directly appointed by the monarch for major cities.) deputy and senator) and academician who served important political offices in the reign of Isabella II of Spain, including those of Ministry of Governance, Minister of State, Minister of Justice and speaker of the Congress of Deputies.

== Biography ==
Pedro José Pidal y Carniado was born in Villaviciosa, Asturias. On finishing his Law studies, he moved to Madrid in 1822 and started working for a prestigious law firm and collaborated with the short-lived daily El Espectador (1821-3), founded by his fellow Asturian liberal, Evaristo San Miguel.

Before becoming increasingly involved in politics, he briefly (c. 1841) held the Chair of History of Government and Legislation in Spain at the Ateneo de Madrid. He became an academician of the Real Academia Española in 1844, of the Real Academia de la Historia in 1847, and director of this institution in 1852.

== Pidal Plan ==
Among the many other reforms carried out by Pidal as Minister of the Interior, the so-called Pidal Plan (1845) —the most important of a series of reforms in Spain's education system that would eventually lead to the so-called Ley Moyano (1857), which would remain in effect until 1970—, implemented the first major overhaul of Spain's education system. Actually drawn up by his friend Antonio Gil y Zárate, the plan called for state-run institutos to be created in each provincial capital and among the many aspects the plan introduced were modifications to the syllabus, with the subjects of Spanish literature introduced at secondary level and geography and Spanish history introduced for both secondary and university students. (Note: Gil y Zárate stated that "It is shameful that there are people from the distinguished classes of society who do not know what this society has been and how it was formed".)

The plan also created the first chair in International Law, a post first held, albeit briefly, by Lorenzo Arrazola y García, a former Minister of Justice, future Prime Minister of Spain and President of the Supreme Court.

== Family ==
He married with Manuela Mon y Menéndez (1802-1889) and had 3 children :

- Luis Pidal y Mon (1842-1913), II marqués de Pidal, President of the Senate of Spain
  - father of María de las Maravillas de Jesús (1891-1974)
- Alejandro Pidal y Mon (1846–1913) would also become a deputy (as well as Speaker of Congress) and academician (also being appointed director of the Real Academia Española).
  - father of Pedro Pidal Bernaldo de Quirós (1870–1941), who would likewise enter politics, becoming both deputy and senador.
- Ramona Pidal y Mon (circa 1848-1896), married to Juan Menéndez Fernández and mother of
  - Juan Menéndez Pidal (1858–1915), historian and poet,
  - Luis Menéndez Pidal (1861-1932), painter,
  - Ramón Menéndez Pidal (1869–1968), historian.

== Notes ==
Political offices
Preceded by The Duke of Sotomayor	Minister of State; 29 July 1848 – 19 October 1849	Succeeded by The Count of Colombi
Preceded by The Count of Colombi	Minister of State; 20 October 1849 – 14 January 1851	Succeeded by Manuel Bertrán de Lis
Preceded by Nicomedes Pastor Díaz	Minister of State; 12 October 1856 – 15 October 1857	Succeeded by Leopoldo Augusto de Cueto
