= Columbus Day =

National holiday in the Americas

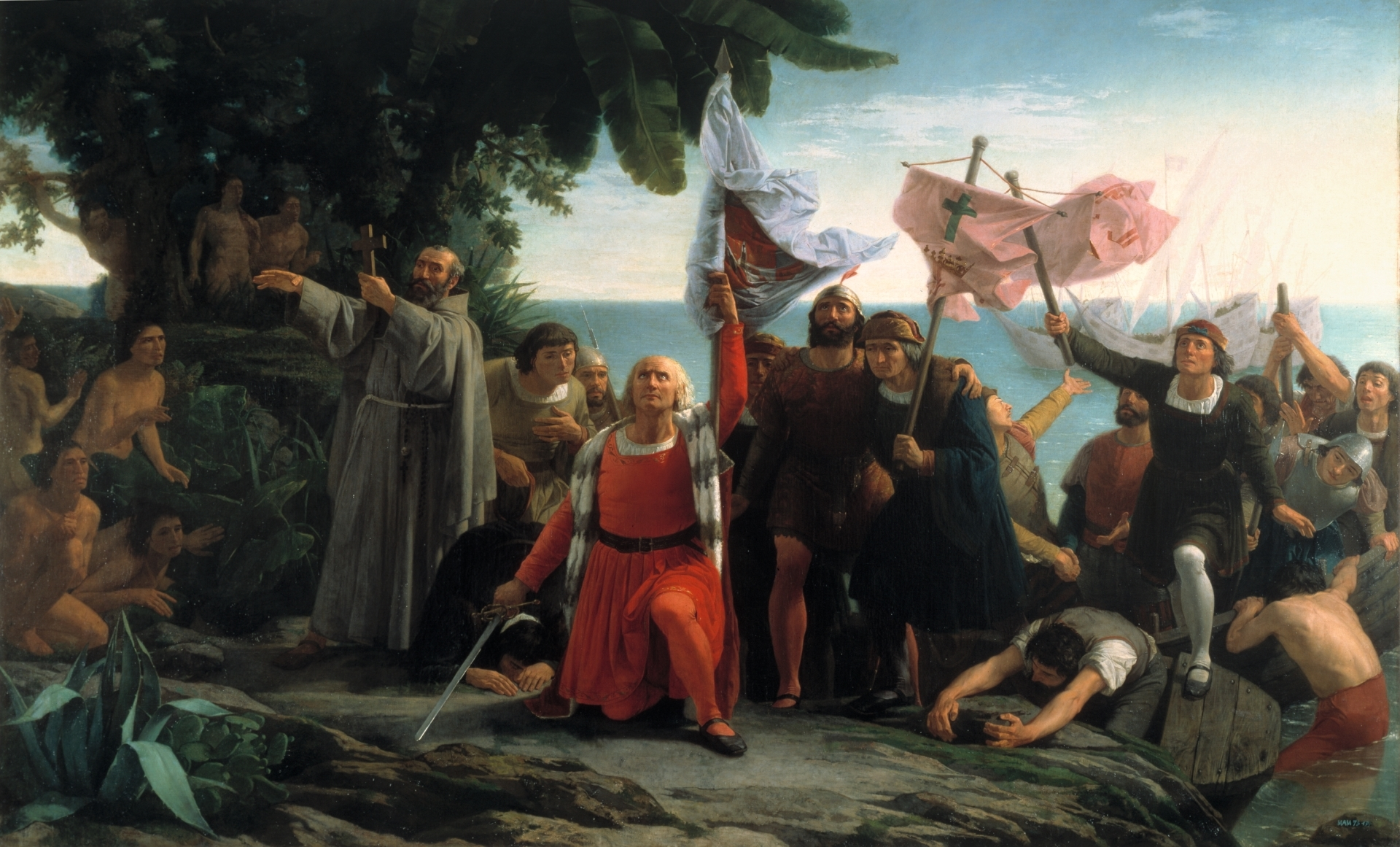
- First Landing of Columbus on the Shores of the New World. Painting by Dióscoro Puebla (1862)
- Observed by: Various countries in the Americas, Italy, Spain, various barrios around the world, various Little Italys around the world
- Type: Historical
- Significance: Celebrations honoring Christopher Columbus' arrival in the Americas in 1492; Recognize contributions of Americans of Italian descent
- Date: October 12 (actual/traditional); second Monday in October (United States)
- 2025 date: October 13 (United States)
- 2026 date: October 12 (United States)
- 2027 date: October 11 (United States)
- 2028 date: October 9 (United States)
- Frequency: Annual

Columbus Day is a national holiday in many countries of the Americas and elsewhere, and a federal holiday in the United States, intended to celebrate the anniversary of the arrival of Christopher Columbus in the Americas. He went ashore at Guanahaní, an island in the Bahamas, on October 12, 1492 [OS]. (Note: This date is according to the Julian Calendar; it would have been October 21, 1492, on the Proleptic Gregorian calendar, which extends the Gregorian calendar to dates prior to its adoption on October 4, 1582.) He built La Navidad on the northwestern coast of the island of Hispaniola (near present-day Caracol, Nord-Est Department, Haiti) in late December 1492, the first European fort in the Americas. After the destruction of the fort by the indigenous Taíno people, Columbus established La Isabela on the central-northern coast of the island (now present-day Dominican Republic) in late December 1493, the first stable European settlement in the Americas.

Christopher Columbus (Italian: Cristoforo Colombo [kriˈstɔːforo koˈlombo]) was an Italian explorer (Note: Though the modern state of Italy had yet to be established, the Latin equivalent of the term Italian had been in use for natives of the region since antiquity; most scholars believe he was born in the Republic of Genoa.) from Genoa, who led a Spanish maritime expedition to cross the Atlantic Ocean in search of an alternative route to the Far East. Columbus believed he sailed his crew to the East Indies, but Europeans realized years later that his voyages landed them in the New World. His first voyage to the New World was made on the Spanish ships Niña, Pinta, and Santa María and took about three months. The crew's arrival in the New World initiated the colonization of the Americas by Spain, followed in the ensuing centuries by other European powers, as well as the transfer of plants, animals, culture, human populations, and technology between the New and Old Worlds, an event referred to by some late 20th‐century historians as the Columbian exchange.

The landing is celebrated as Columbus Day in the United States, but the name varies internationally. In some Latin American countries, October 12 is known as Día de la Raza or "Day of the Race". This was the case for Mexico, until it renamed it to "Day of the Pluricultural Nation" (Día de la Nación Pluricultural). Some countries such as Spain refer to the holiday as the Day of Hispanicity or Día de la Hispanidad and is also Spain's National Day or Fiesta Nacional de España, where it coincides with the religious festivity of La Virgen del Pilar. Since 2009, Peru has celebrated Día de los pueblos originarios y el diálogo intercultural ("Indigenous Peoples and Intercultural Dialogue Day"). Uruguay celebrate it as Pan American Day and Día de las Américas ("Day of the Americas"). The day is also commemorated in Italy, as Giornata Nazionale di Cristoforo Colombo or Festa Nazionale di Cristoforo Colombo, and in the Little Italys around the world. In Belize, the day is recognized as Indigenous People's Resistance Day.

== Observance in the United States ==
=== History ===
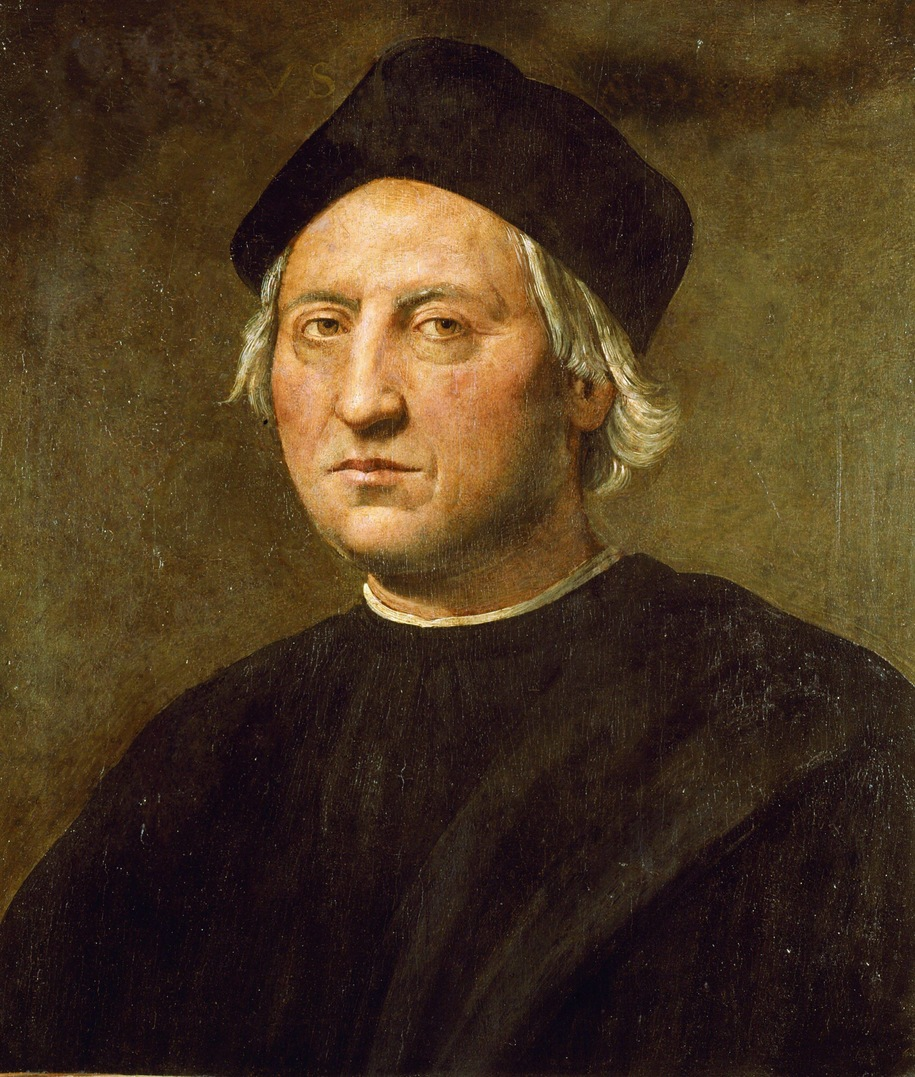
Christopher Columbus (Italian: Cristoforo Colombo), posthumous portrait by Ridolfo Ghirlandaio, c. 1520

The first Columbus Day celebration took place on October 12, 1792, when the Columbian Order of New York, better known as the Tammany Society (the precursor to Tammany Hall), held an event to commemorate the 300th anniversary of the historic landing. The Columbus Obelisk in Baltimore was erected in 1792.

Many Italian Americans observe Columbus Day as a celebration of their heritage and not of Columbus himself. The day was celebrated in New York City on October 12, 1866. The day was first enshrined as a legal holiday in the United States through the lobbying of Angelo Noce, an Italian-American immigrant, in Denver. The first statewide holiday was proclaimed by Colorado governor Jesse F. McDonald in 1905, and it was made a statutory holiday in 1907. (Colorado replaced Columbus Day with Frances Xavier Cabrini Day in 2020, though that holiday is observed a week earlier.)

For the 400th anniversary of Christopher Columbus's voyage in 1892, following the lynchings of 11 Italian immigrants by a mob in New Orleans, President Benjamin Harrison declared Columbus Day as a one-time national celebration. The proclamation was part of a wider effort after the lynching incident to placate Italian Americans and ease diplomatic tensions with Italy. During the anniversary in 1892, teachers, preachers, poets, and politicians used rituals to teach ideals of patriotism. These rituals took themes such as citizenship boundaries, the importance of loyalty to the nation, and the celebration of social progress; included among them was the Pledge of Allegiance by Francis Bellamy.

Stylized graphic from the United States Department of Defense

In 1934, as a result of lobbying by the Knights of Columbus and New York City Italian leader Generoso Pope, Congress passed a statute stating: "The President is requested to issue each year a proclamation (1) designating October 12 as Columbus Day; (2) calling on United States government officials to display the flag of the United States on all government buildings on Columbus Day; and (3) inviting the people of the United States to observe Columbus Day, in schools and churches, or other suitable places, with appropriate ceremonies that express the public sentiment befitting the anniversary of the discovery of America." President Franklin Delano Roosevelt responded by making such a proclamation. This proclamation did not lead to the modern federal holiday; it was similar to language regarding Thomas Jefferson's birthday and Gold Star Mothers Day. In 1941, some 1,881 Italian Americans were interned and lost rights as "enemy aliens" because of a widely held belief that they would remain loyal to Italy, an Axis power, during World War II. Almost all of those interned were citizens of Italy, including Italian students and businessmen residing in the U.S.; the internment did not include the 690,000 Italians who had immigrated to the United States and millions of other Americans of Italian descent. On Columbus Day 1942, Franklin Roosevelt announced the removal of the designation of Italian Americans as "enemy aliens" along with a plan to offer citizenship to 200,000 elderly Italians living in the United States who had been unable to acquire citizenship due to a literacy requirement. However, the implementation of the announcement was not completed until those interned in camps were released following Italy's surrender to the Allies on September 8, 1943.

In 1966, Mariano A. Lucca, from Buffalo, New York, founded the National Columbus Day Committee, which lobbied to make Columbus Day a federal holiday. These efforts were successful and legislation to create Columbus Day as a federal holiday was signed by President Lyndon Johnson on June 28, 1968, to be effective beginning in 1971.

Since 1971, when Columbus Day became an officially recognized federal holiday in the United States, it has been observed on the second Monday in October, as commemorated by annual Presidential proclamation noting Columbus' achievements. It is generally observed by banks, the bond market, the U.S. Postal Service, other federal agencies, most state government offices, many businesses, and most school districts. Some businesses and some stock exchanges remain open, and some states and municipalities abstain from observing the holiday. The traditional date of the holiday also adjoins the anniversary of the United States Navy (founded October 13, 1775), and thus both occasions are customarily observed by the Navy and the Marine Corps with either a 72- or 96-hour liberty period.

The observance on the second Monday in October means it coincides with the Canadian holiday of Thanksgiving.

=== Localization ===
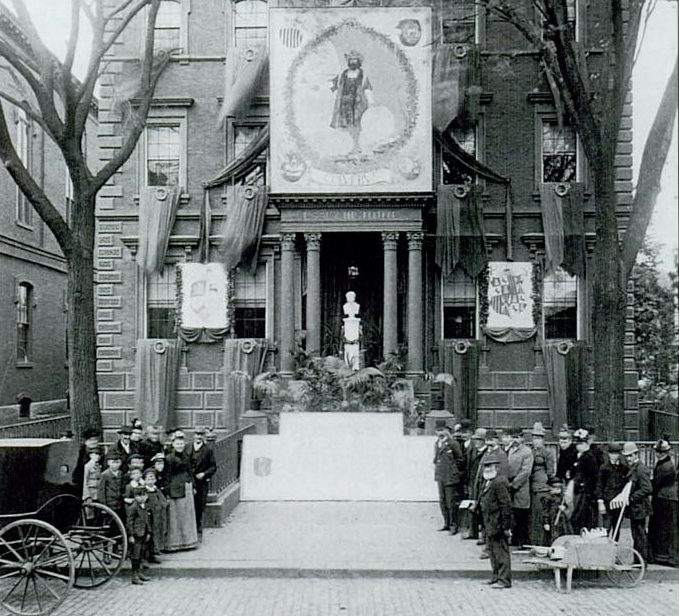
Columbus Day in Salem, Massachusetts, in 1892

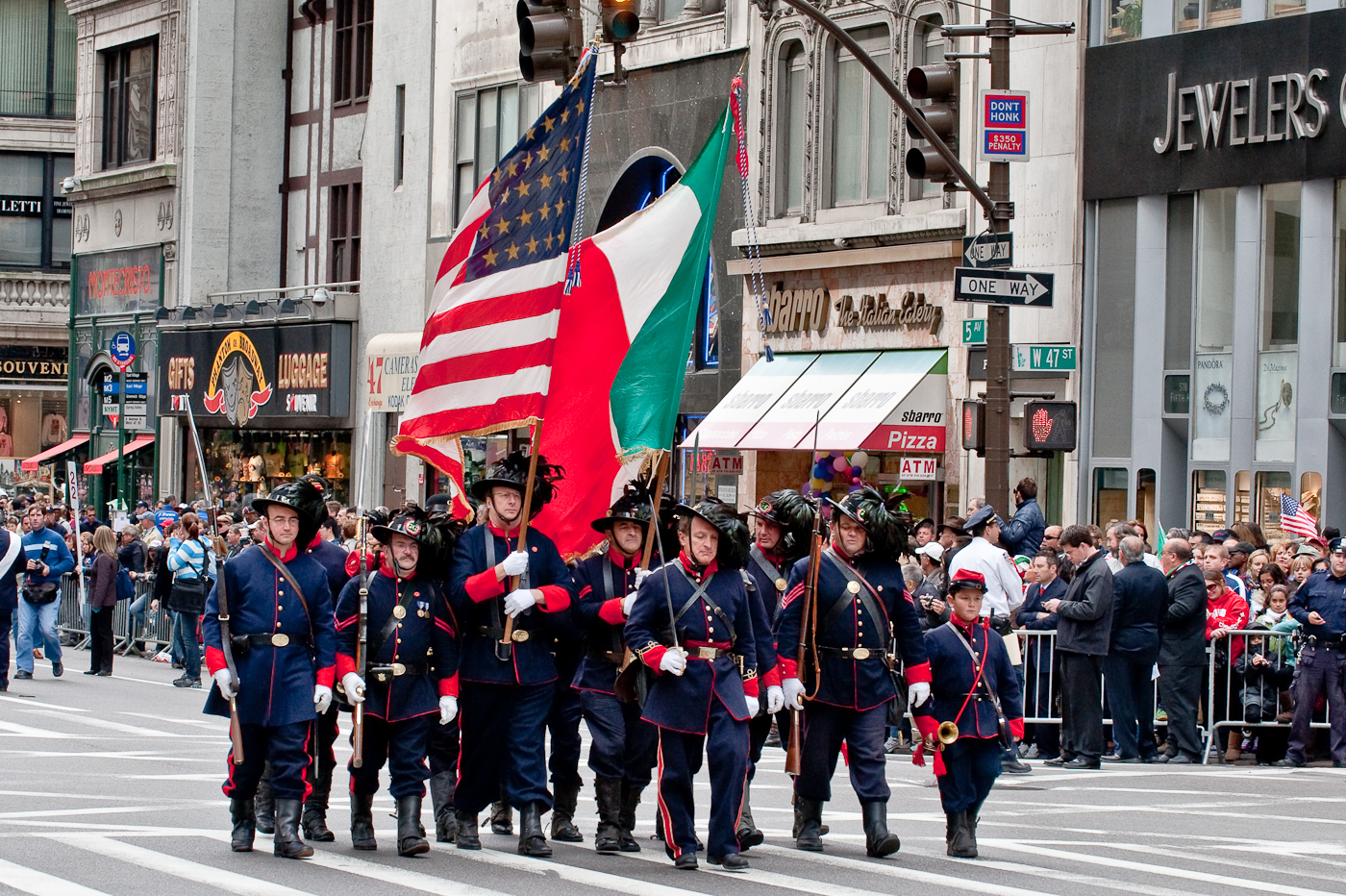
Columbus Day Parade in New York City, 2009

Actual observance varies in different parts of the United States, ranging from large-scale parades and events to complete nonobservance. Most states do not celebrate Columbus Day as an official state holiday. Some mark it as a "Day of Observance" or "Recognition”. Most states that celebrate Columbus Day will close state services, while others operate as normal.

San Francisco claims the nation's oldest continuously existing celebration with the Italian-American community's annual Columbus Day Parade, which was established by Nicola Larco in 1868, while New York City boasts the largest, with over 35,000 marchers and one million viewers around 2010.

As in the mainland United States, Columbus Day is a legal holiday in the U.S. territory of Puerto Rico. In the United States Virgin Islands, the day is celebrated as both Columbus Day and "Puerto Rico Friendship Day".

Virginia also celebrates two legal holidays on the day, Columbus Day and Yorktown Victory Day, which honors the final victory at the Siege of Yorktown in the Revolutionary War.

=== Nonobservance ===
The celebration of Columbus Day in the United States began to decline at the end of the 20th century, although many Americans continue to celebrate it. The District of Columbia and the states of Colorado, Hawaii, Alaska, Vermont, South Dakota, New Mexico, Maine, Minnesota, and parts of California, including, for example, Los Angeles County, do not recognize it and have each replaced it with celebrations of Indigenous Peoples' Day (in Hawaii, "Discoverers' Day", in South Dakota, "Native American Day") or other holidays. In the states of Delaware, Oregon and Washington, Columbus Day is not an official holiday. In Washington's case, the holiday was removed as a legal holiday between 1975 and 1977, and from then the state government has categorized it as a "legislatively recognized day."

Iowa and Nevada do not observe Columbus Day as an official holiday, but the states' respective governors are "authorized and requested" by statute to proclaim the day each year. In Nevada's case, it's not because of the controversy, but because it falls too close to Nevada Day (which is a full holiday for which schools and some state government facilities are closed). Several other states have removed the day as a paid holiday for state government workers, while maintaining it either as a day of recognition, or as a legal holiday for other purposes, including California and Texas.

The practice of U.S. cities eschewing Columbus Day to celebrate Indigenous Peoples' Day began in 1992 with Berkeley, California. The list of cities that have followed suit as of 2018 includes Austin, Boise, Cincinnati, Denver, Los Angeles, Mankato, Philadelphia, Portland, San Francisco, Santa Fe, Seattle, Saint Paul, Phoenix, Tacoma, and "dozens of others".

Columbus, Ohio, has chosen to honor veterans instead of Christopher Columbus, and removed Columbus Day as a city holiday in 2018. Various tribal governments in Oklahoma designate the day as Native American Day, or name it after their own tribe.

In 2017, the city council of Akron, Ohio, became split along racial lines with the decision to replace Columbus Day with Indigenous Peoples' Day, creating pushback from the city's Italian-American community. In 2018, a compromise was reached, with the city council voting to name the first Monday of October as North American First People's Day while keeping Columbus Day, and in 2020, Columbus Day was renamed Italian-American Heritage and Culture Day.

== Latin American observance ==
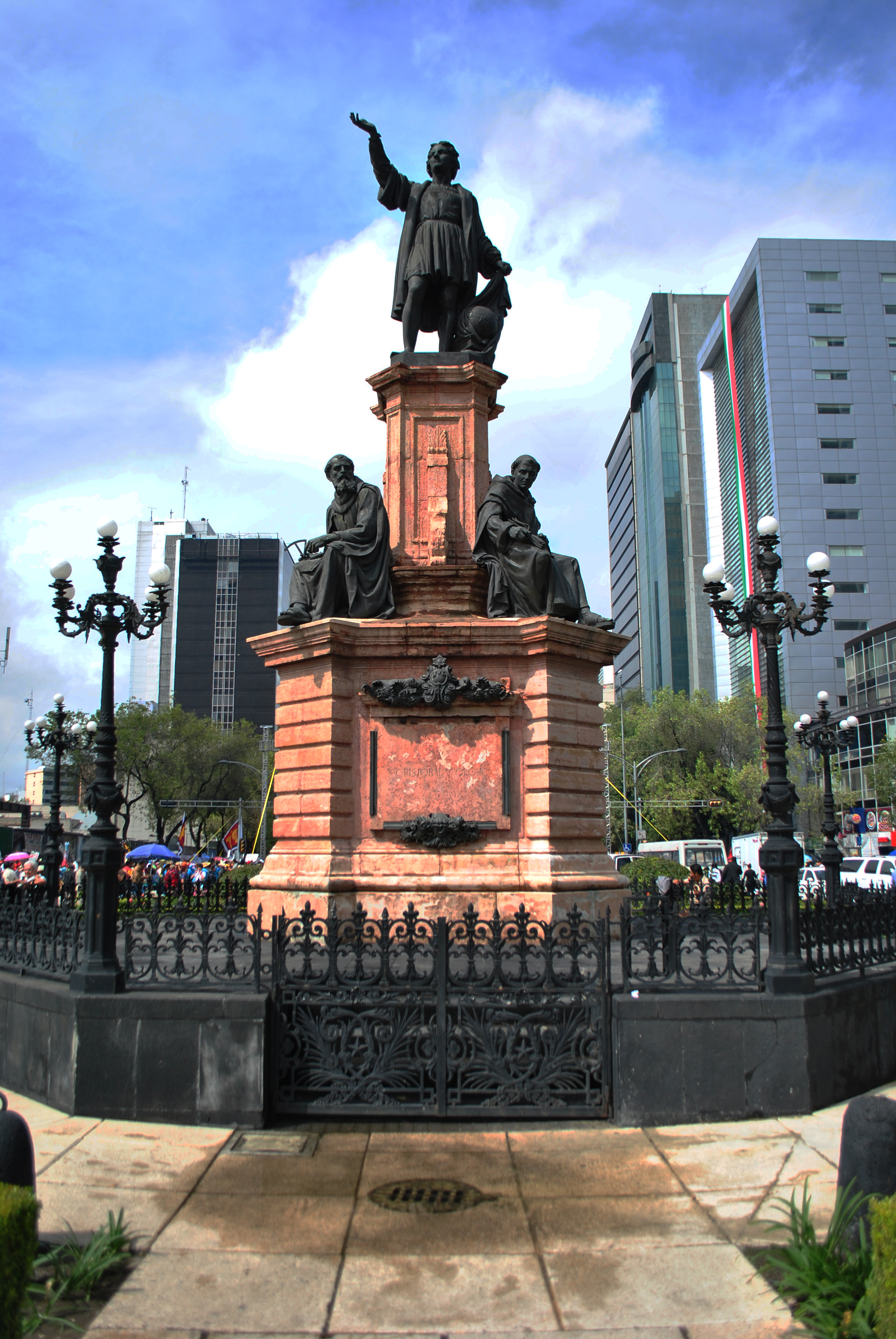
The former Christopher Columbus Monument along Paseo de la Reforma in Mexico

The date Columbus arrived in the Americas is celebrated in some countries of Latin America. The most common name for the celebration in Spanish (including some Latin American communities in the United States) is the Día de la Raza ("day of the race" or the "day of the [Hispanic] people"), commemorating the first encounters of Europeans and the Native Americans. The day was first celebrated in Argentina in 1917, in Venezuela and Colombia in 1921, in Chile in 1922, and in Mexico, it was first celebrated in 1928. The day was also celebrated under this title in Spain until 1957, when it was changed to the Día de la Hispanidad ("Hispanicity Day"), and in Venezuela, it was celebrated under this title until 2002, when it was changed to the Día de la Resistencia Indígena (Day of Indigenous Resistance). Originally conceived of as a celebration of Hispanic influence in the Americas, as evidenced by the complementary celebrations in Spain and Latin America, Día de la Raza has come to be seen by nationalist activists throughout Latin America as a counter to Columbus Day – a celebration of the native races and cultures and their resistance to the arrival of Europeans in the Americas.

In the United States, Día de la Raza has served as a time of mobilization for panethnic Latino activists, particularly since the 1960s. Since then, La Raza has served as a periodic rallying cry for Hispanic activists. The first Hispanic March on Washington occurred on Columbus Day in 1996. The name was used by the largest Hispanic social justice organization in the nation, UnidosUS, which was known as the National Council of La Raza from 1968 to 2017.

On October 10, 1992, Pope John Paul II visited the Dominican Republic to celebrate the 500th anniversary of the discovery of the Americas and the arrival of Christianity in the "New World". His visit ended with a mass in the nation's cathedral, the first cathedral in the Western Hemisphere.

=== Argentina ===
Argentine government poster from 1947 including the concept of la Raza.

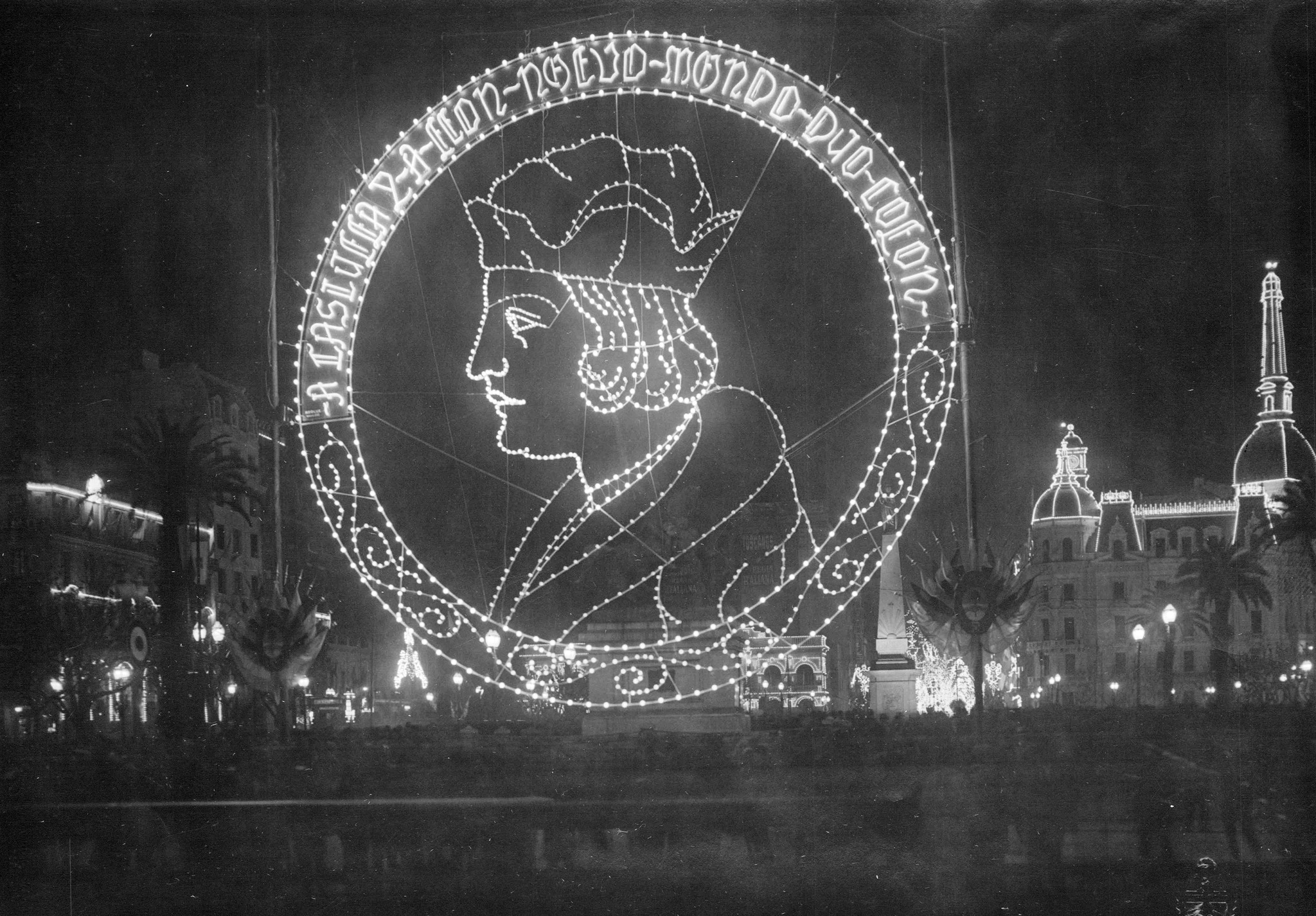
Plaza de Mayo in Argentina "Día de la Raza", with an image of Christopher Columbus, 1929.

The Day of the Race was established in Argentina in 1916 by a decree of President Hipólito Yrigoyen. The name was changed to "Day of Respect of Cultural Diversity" by a presidential decree in 2010 issued by President Cristina Kirchner. The statue of Columbus was removed from its original position near the Casa Rosada and replaced by one of Juana Azurduy, a patriot and leader in the struggle for independence who had indigenous ancestors.

=== Colombia ===
Colombia, whose name originated from Columbus himself, celebrates El día de la Raza y de la Hispanidad (meaning "Day of the Race and Hispanicity"), and is taken as an opportunity to celebrate the encounter of "the two worlds" and to reflect on the richness that the racial diversity has brought to the culture. In 2021 the Ministry of Culture changed the name of the holiday to ‘Día de la Diversidad Étnica y Cultural de la Nación Colombiana (meaning "Day of Ethnic and Cultural Diversity of the Colombian nation").

=== Peru ===
In Peru, it was known as Día del descubrimiento de América ("Day of the discovery of America"). Since 2009, it has been celebrated as Día de los pueblos originarios y el diálogo intercultural (Indigenous Peoples and Intercultural Dialogue Day).

=== Venezuela ===
Between 1921 and 2002, Venezuela celebrated Día de la Raza along with many other Latin American nations. The original holiday was officially established in 1921 under President Juan Vicente Gómez. In 2002, under President Hugo Chávez, the holiday was changed to Día de la Resistencia Indígena (Day of Indigenous Resistance) to commemorate the Indigenous peoples' resistance to European settlement.

On October 12, 2004, a crowd of progovernment activists toppled a statue of Christopher Columbus by Rafael de la Cova in Caracas. The activists also sprayed allusive graffiti over its pedestal. The walk where the statue had stood was renamed in 2008 "Indigenous Resistance Walk". Later, a statue of an indigenous leader, Guaicaipuro, was erected on the plinth.

=== Costa Rica ===
On September 21, 1994, Costa Rica changed the official holiday from Día de la Raza to Día del Encuentro de las Culturas (Day of the Encounter of Cultures) to recognize the mix of European, Native American (autochthonous populations), African and Asian cultures that constitute modern Costa Rican (and Latin American) culture and ethnicity. In accordance to the Costa Rican labor law, the holiday is observed on October 12. Should this date coincide with a Tuesday, Wednesday, Thursday, or Friday, the employer shall agree that said holiday be postponed to the following Monday. In 2020, Costa Ricans eliminated this holiday, which was under debate in years prior. Hence, in exchange Costa Rica now celebrates the 'Military Abolition Day' on December 1.

=== El Salvador ===
In June 1915, the official holiday of 'Fiesta de la Raza' was established, with October 12 being the date of the national holiday. Presently, since October 12, 2021, the Legislative Assembly of El Salvador abolished the previous national Fiesta de la Raza holiday, " [to] vindicate the origin and identity of indigenous peoples who were forgotten by previous governments, who for decades celebrated Race Day as a positive event and who never adopted mechanisms to enhance human rights". The holiday is no longer celebrated officially.

=== Mexico ===
UNAM's motto on its university coat of arms "The spirit shall speak for my race" created by José Vasconcelos.

In Mexico, the date was known as Columbus Day or Day of the Race. On December 18, 2020, by decree of President Andrés Manuel López Obrador, the name of October 12 was changed to "Day of the Pluricultural Nation". The statue of Columbus along Mexico City's Paseo de la Reforma was removed and replaced with a replica of The Young Woman of Amajac, a sculpture depicting an Indigenous woman.

== Caribbean observance ==
Only a handful of Caribbean countries observe holidays related to Columbus Day. In Belize, October 12 is observed as Indigenous Peoples' Resistance Day. Formerly known as Pan American Day, the name was changed in 2021 to move away from its colonial legacy. In the Bahamas, it was formerly known as Discovery Day, until 2001 when it was replaced by National Heroes Day. In 1937, Cuban President Federico Laredo Brú (1936–1940) spoke to the nation and countries of America in Cuba on October 12 commemorating Christopher Columbus's voyage to the New World. Federico Laredo Brú spoke about Columbus's impact on the land and the future of its settlement. He ended his speech with venerating Christopher Columbus's efforts to colonize and establish settlements along the new front and the pride of one's nation. He added "Por mi raza hablo mi espiritu," which translates to "For my race my spirit called," to support the political infrastructure at the time.

=== Columbus's legacy ===
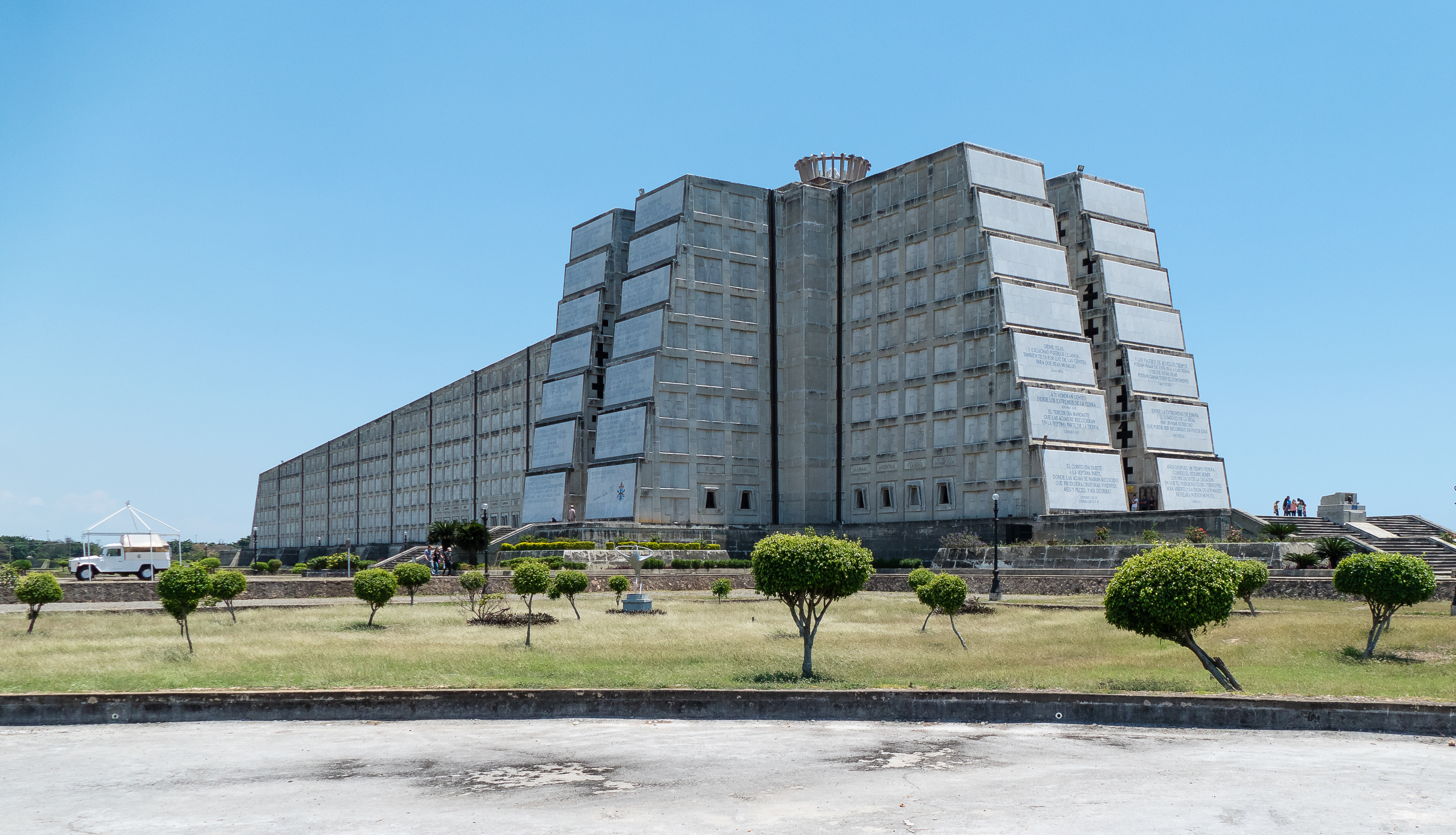
The Columbus Lighthouse in Santo Domingo Este, Dominican Republic

In December 1937, Cuban president Federico Laredo Brú and Dominican Republic president Rafael Trujillo ordered a crew of aviators to travel through Latin America collecting funds from large capital cities for a monumental light house in the Dominican Republic. The exploration Escuadrilla Binacional Pro Faro de Colón was inspired by Columbus's journey across the North Atlantic Ocean to America. The expedition consisted of three Stinson Reliant SR-9s borrowed from the Cuban Air Force – named Santa María, Niña and Pinta after the vessels commanded by Columbus – and a Curtiss Wright CW-19R from the Dominican military aviation named Colon after Columbus. On December 15, after visiting a majority of South America, their flight to the Peruvian capital Lima was hampered by an unexpected sandstorm. Two planes (Colon and La Pinta) were forced to land in Pisco and Niña disappeared in the storm. The Santa Maria was the only plane to reach Lima as planned, landing at Las Palmas on the day of the storm. After extensive searches, Niña radioed their whereabouts after their radio was damaged in the storm. The aircraft restrategized in Las Palmas, and on December 29 their expedition took off from El Techo airport in Bogotá en route to El Guabito airport in Cali. Later that day, the crew flew into an unexpected storm over the Valley of Cauca. With minimal visibility and poor navigation, Niña, La Pinta, and Santa Maria crashed into high mountains, while Colon, unaware of the other aircraft, flew over the storm and safely made it to Panama City. The plane is preserved today as remembrance of the bravery of the crew and Christopher Columbus's journey.

In 1992, in remembrance of the 500th anniversary of the discovery of America, the Columbus Lighthouse, in Santo Domingo Este was inaugurated. The monument is both a mausoleum and a museum showcasing objects including a boat from Cuba and Colombian jewelry. Constructed of concrete, the monument is 680 feet (210 m) long. Its architecture is cross-shaped and represents the Christianization of the Americas. According to Dominican authorities, Columbus' remains are sheltered at the lighthouse. Spanish authorities proved through DNA tests that remains in the Cathedral of Seville were his and Dominican authorities have not allowed the same, so whether the sets are related remains unknown.

== European observance ==
=== Italy ===
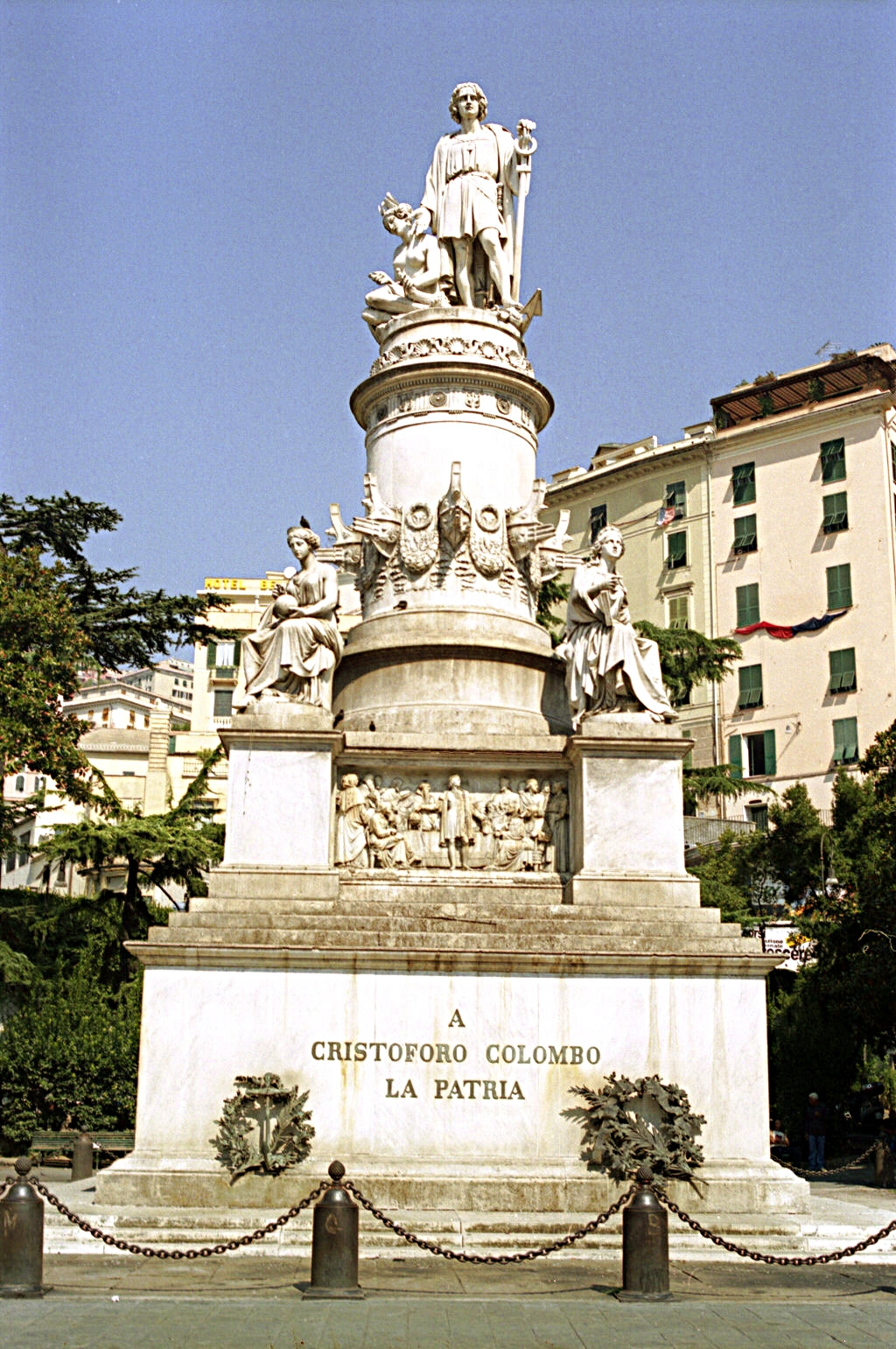
Monument to Christopher Columbus in Genoa, Italy

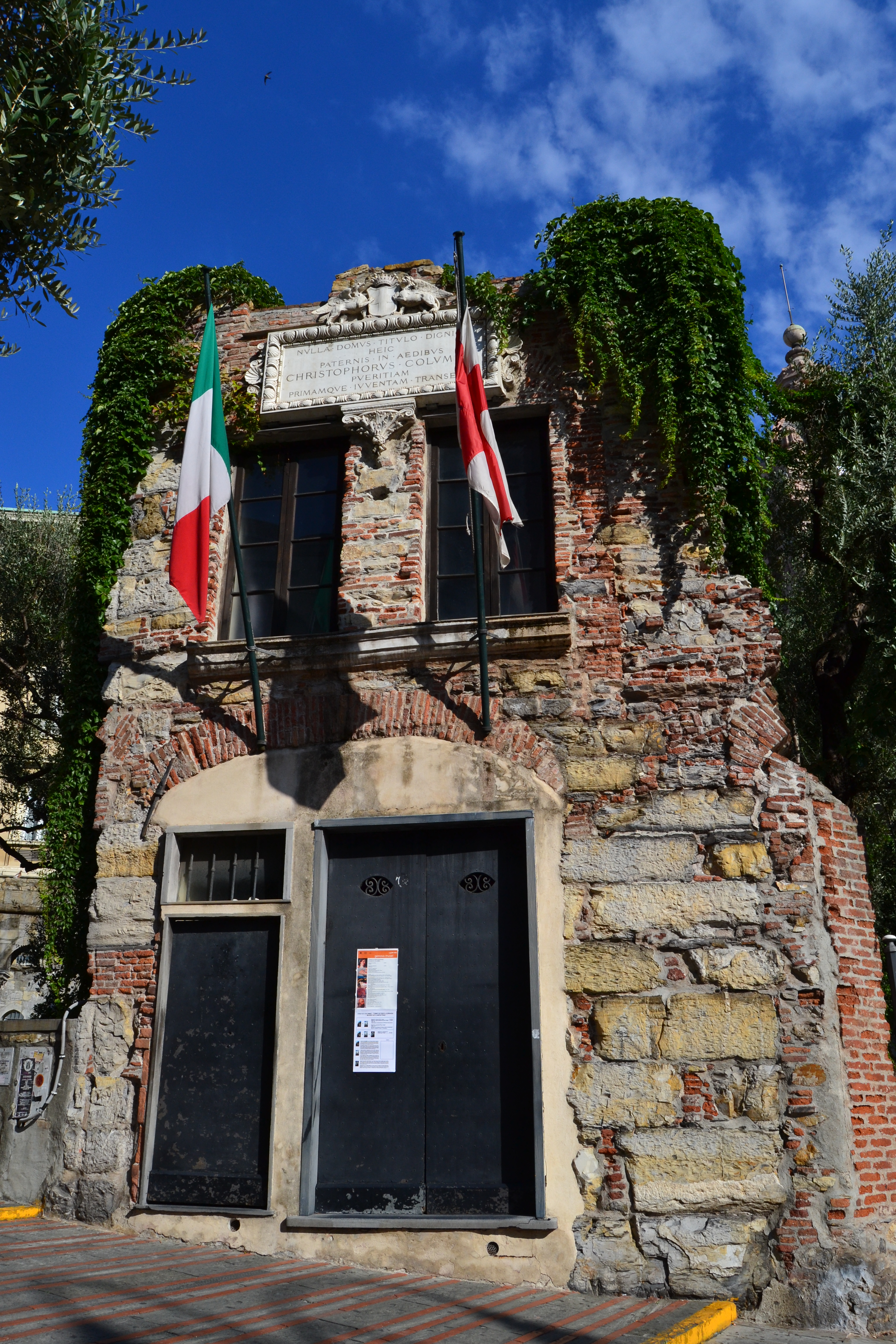
Christopher Columbus House in Genoa, Italy

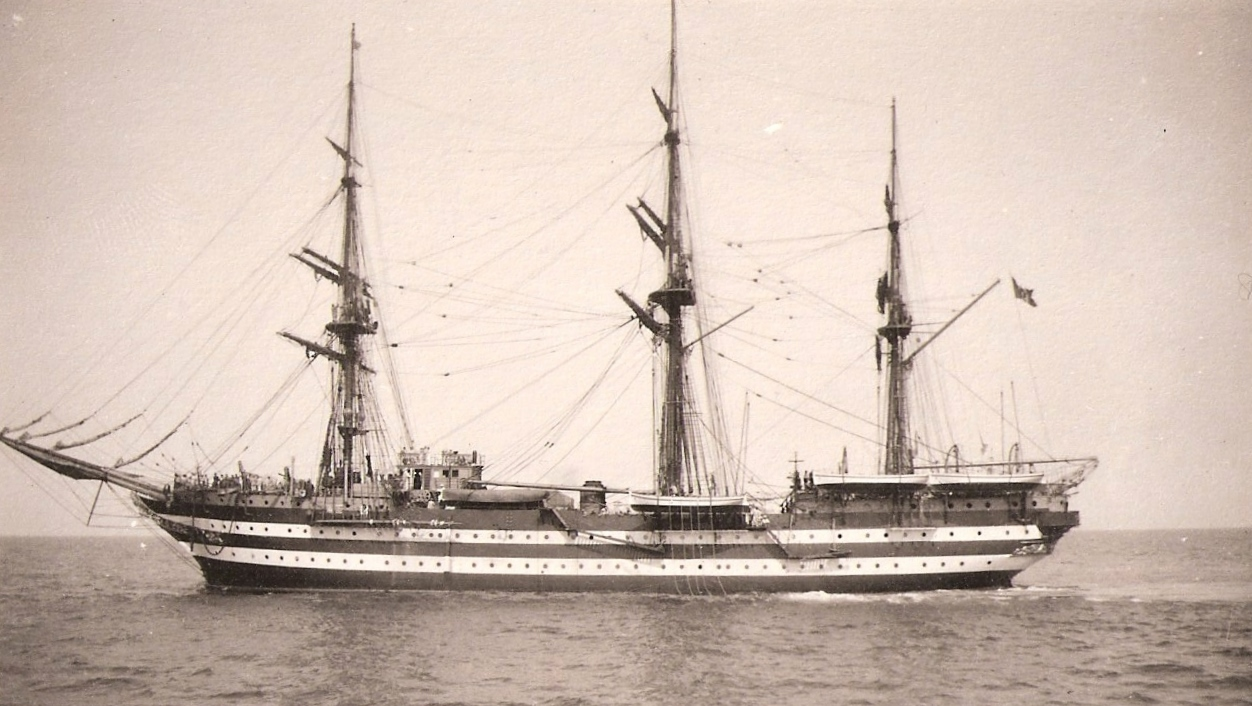
The Italian training ship SS Cristoforo Colombo

Since the 18th century, many Italian communities in the Americas have observed the Discovery of the New World as a celebration of their heritage, since Columbus was born in Republic of Genoa, nowadays Italy. In Italy, Columbus Day is not a public holiday, but a celebratory day introduced 2004 as Giornata nazionale di Cristoforo Colombo ("National Christopher Columbus Day").

The Christopher Columbus House in Genoa, Italy, is an 18th-century reconstruction of the house in which Christopher Columbus grew up. The house is located outside Genoa's 14th-century walls. During the Renaissance, the area became subject to intense building, mainly consisting of public housing. Columbus was born in 1451, and historical documents indicated that Columbus lived here between approximately 1455 and 1470. At this time, the house had two or maybe three stories, with a shop on the ground floor, and the front door to the left of the shop.

The "Lega Navale Italiana" has created a Regata di Colombo ("Columbus Regatta") as a celebration of the Columbus achievement. Italians have celebrated Christopher Columbus (Italian: Cristoforo Colombo [kriˈstɔːforo koˈlombo]) naming after him many civilian and military ships, like the training ship SS Cristoforo Colombo and the ocean liner SS Cristoforo Colombo.

=== Spain ===
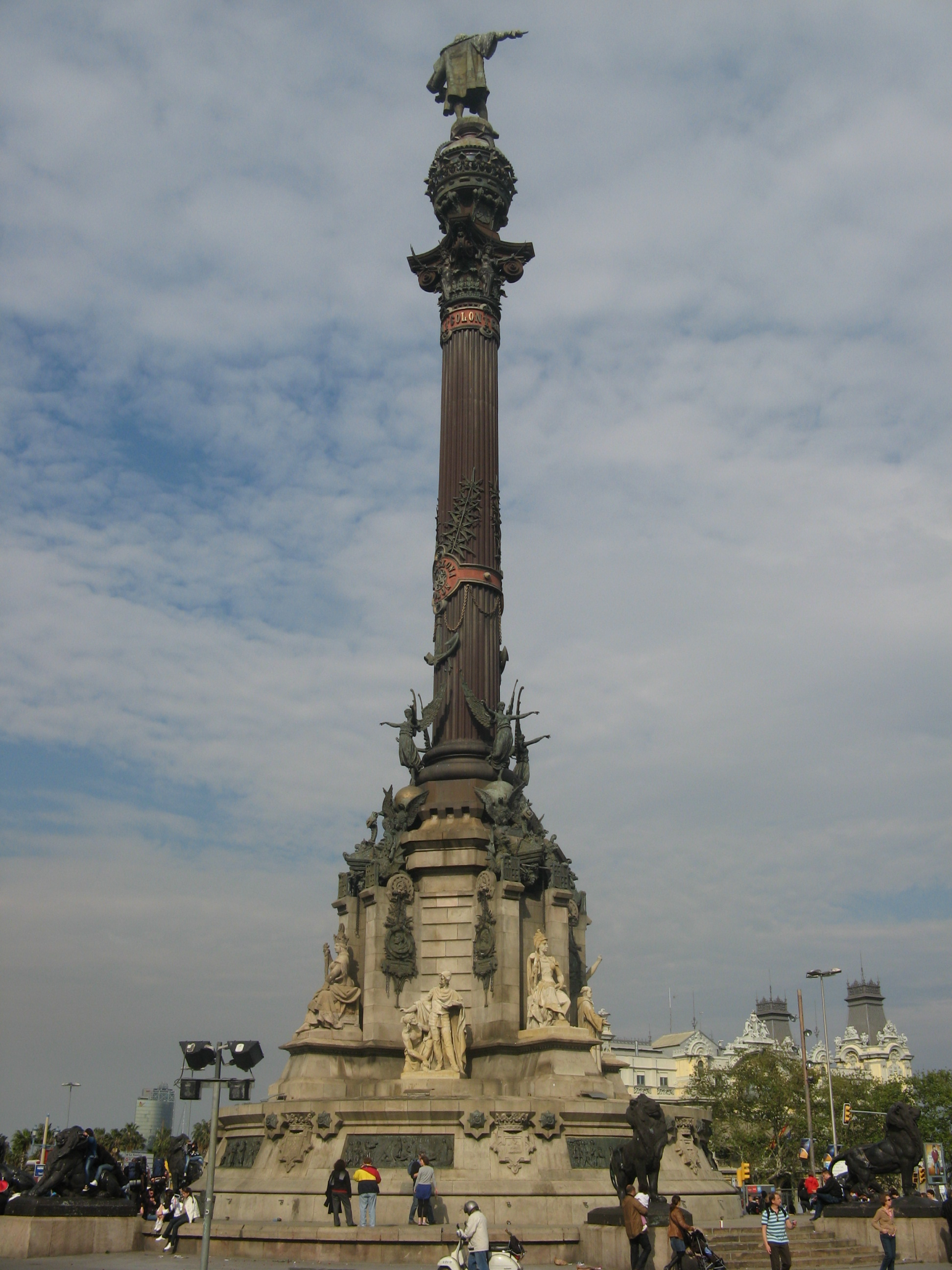
Statue of Christopher Columbus in Barcelona

The first celebration of the Discovery of the Americas by Columbus in Spain was as early as 1642 when the city of Zaragoza designated the Virgen del Pilar (Our Lady of the Pillar) as symbol of the Hispanidad (Hispanicity) on the date of the Spanish expedition's arrival to the New World. This holiday was declared a religious feast day throughout the Spanish Empire in 1730. In 1892, the 12 of October was declared a one-time national day in commemoration of the 4th centenary of the Discovery of America and the perpetuation of the festivity was then first considered. The Spanish government suggested other nations (Hispanic American countries, Italy and the United States of America) to join the celebration, which was followed with enthusiasm by them, with a few exceptions. The Discovery of America and the Hispanicity has been celebrated as a national day since 1918 under different names like "Día de la Hispanidad" or "Dia de la Raza", due to changes of political regimes in the 20th century. The national day emphasises Spain's ties with the Hispanidad, the international Hispanic community and Spanish legacy to the world. In 1981 a royal decree established the Fiesta Nacional y Día de la Hispanidad as a national holiday. In 1987 the name was changed again to Fiesta Nacional and October 12 became one of two national celebrations, along with Constitution Day on December 6, as part of a compromise between conservatives, who wanted to emphasize the status of the monarchy and Spain's history, and Republicans, who wanted to commemorate Spain's burgeoning democracy with an official holiday. The holiday is widely celebrated in Spain with official and cultural events throughout the country. Shops and businesses are closed as with other bank holidays. The observation is enhanced with the feast day of Our Lady of the Pillar (Fiestas del Pilar), the so-called Mother of Hispanidad, and of Our Lady of Guadalupe in Extremadura (Santa María de Guadalupe) (appointed Queen of Hispanicity in 1928 by the Vatican) from Guadalupe, Cáceres, whose Monastery was the venue in June 1492 for the decisive meeting between the Catholic Monarchs and Columbus to start organizing the travel and where the latter came back in 1493, right after returning from his first voyage, to thank Her for his success.

== Opposition ==
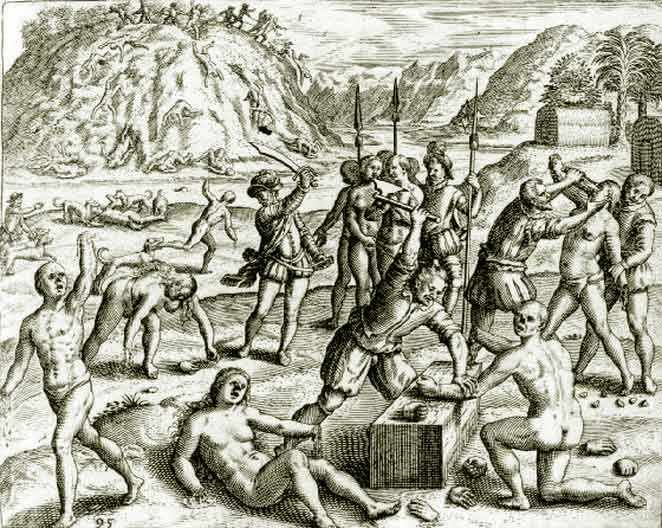
Engraving by Theodor de Bry, depicting the account by Bartolomé de las Casas of the Brevísima relación de la destrucción de las Indias, 1552

For years after the first Columbus Day celebration in 1892, opposition to Columbus Day recognized the suffering inflicted on Native Americans with westward expansion.

It also originated from the anti-immigrant nativist Know Nothing political movement, which sought to eliminate the holiday because of its association with immigrants from the Catholic countries of Ireland and Italy, and the American Catholic fraternal organization the Knights of Columbus. Some anti-Catholic groups, notably including the Ku Klux Klan and the Women of the Ku Klux Klan, opposed celebrations of Columbus or monuments about him because they thought that it increased Catholic influence in the United States, which was largely a Protestant country.

In the summer of 1990, 350 representatives from indigenous groups from all over the hemisphere met in Quito, Ecuador, at the first Intercontinental Gathering of Indigenous People in the Americas, to mobilize against the 500th anniversary (quin-centennial) celebration of Columbus Day planned for 1992. The following summer, in Davis, California, more than a hundred Native Americans gathered for a follow-up meeting to the Quito conference. They declared October 12, 1992, to be "International Day of Solidarity with Indigenous People".

More recently, mainly since the 1990s, more people oppose Columbus's and other Europeans' actions against the indigenous populations of the Americas. This opposition was initially led by Native Americans and was expanded upon by left-wing political parties. In some locations, holidays commemorating Columbus have now been abolished, with various Latin American countries altering the holidays to now recognise indigenous populations.

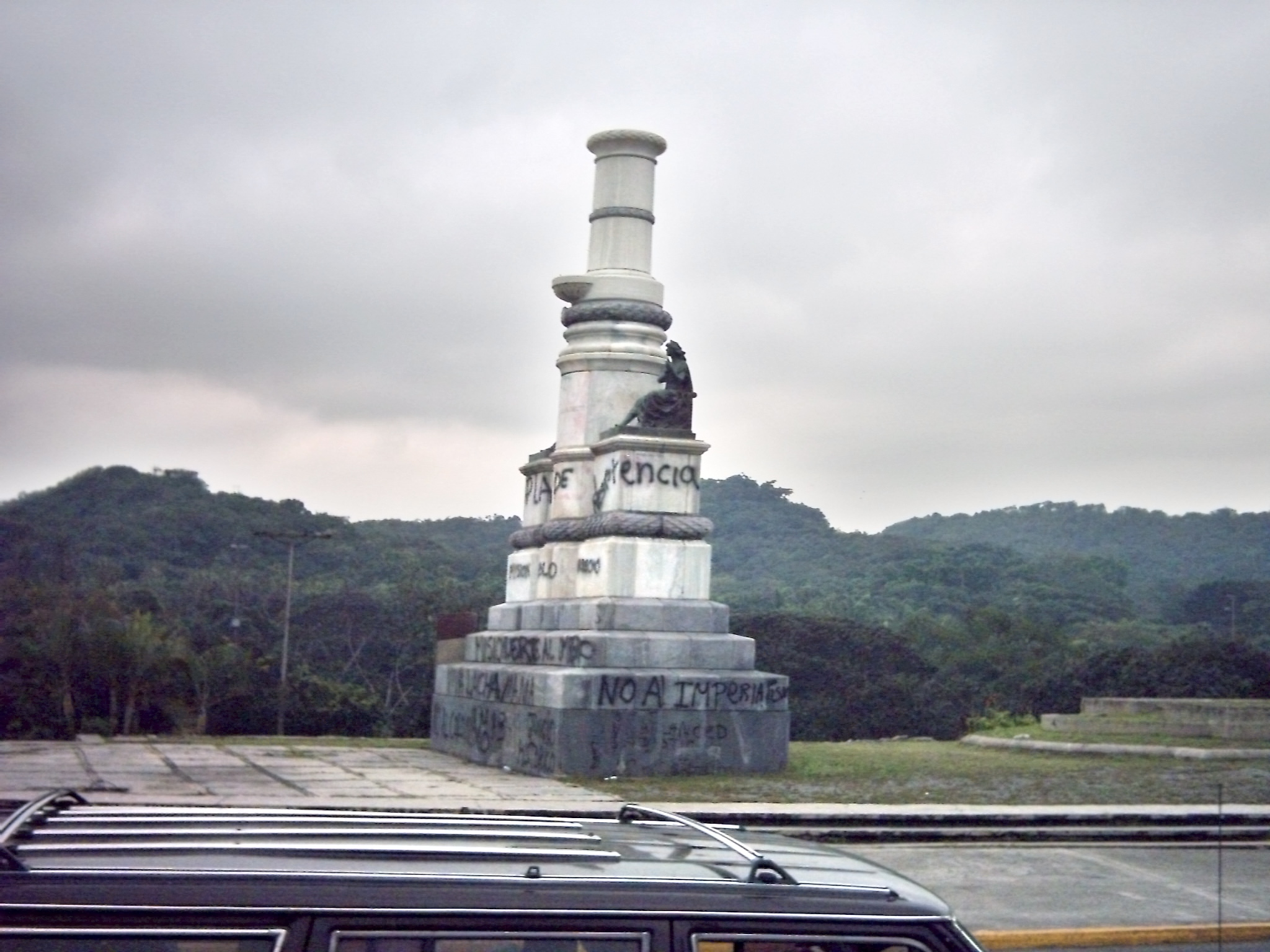
Statueless plinth in Caracas in 2006. A statue of Christopher Columbus, which formerly occupied the plinth, was knocked down by activists in 2004.

There are many interrelated strands of criticism. One refers primarily to the treatment of the indigenous populations during the European colonization of the Americas, which followed Columbus's discovery. Some groups, such as the American Indian Movement, have argued that the ongoing actions and injustices against Native Americans are masked by Columbus myths and celebrations. American anthropologist Jack Weatherford says that on Columbus Day, Americans celebrate the greatest waves of genocide of the American Indians known in history.

A second strain of criticism of Columbus Day focuses on the character of Columbus himself. In time for the 2004 observation of the day, the final volume of a compendium of Columbus-era documents was published by the University of California, Los Angeles' Medieval and Renaissance Center. It stated that Columbus, while a brilliant mariner, exploited and enslaved the indigenous population.

Spelman College historian Howard Zinn described some of the details in his book, A People's History of the United States, of how Columbus personally ordered the enslavement and mutilation of the native Arawak people in a bid to repay his investors.

Journalist and media critic Norman Solomon reflects, in Columbus Day: A Clash of Myth and History, that many people choose to hold on to the myths instead of reality in the events surrounding Columbus. He disputes the idea that the Spaniards' arrival was beneficial towards the Indians by quoting History of the Indies by the Catholic priest Bartolomé de las Casas, who observed the region where Columbus was governor. Las Casas writes that the Spaniards were driven by "insatiable greed" as they killed and tortured native populations with "the strangest and most varied new methods of cruelty" and laments that "my eyes have seen these acts so foreign to human nature, and now I tremble as I write".

== See also ==
- Age of Discovery – Period of European global exploration
- Indigenous Peoples' Day – Day honoring Indigenous Peoples of the Americas
- L'Anse aux Meadows – Norse archaeological site in Newfoundland, Canada
- Leif Erikson Day – Annual observance on October 9
- List of monuments and memorials to Christopher Columbus
- No one is illegal – Political slogan
- Spanish Empire – Colonial empire between 1492 and 1976
- UN Spanish Language Day – Annual observation on 23 April
- World's Columbian Exposition – 1893 world's fair in Chicago, Illinois, US
