= Marquis of Villaviciosa de Asturias =

Marquisate of Villaviciosa de Asturias
- Creation date: 16 December 1892
- Created by: Alfonso XIII
- Peerage: Peerage of Spain
- First holder: Pedro Pidal y Bernaldo de Quirós, 1st Marquis of Villaviciosa de Asturias
- Present holder: Pedro Pidal y Nano, 3rd Marquis of Villaviciosa de Asturias

Marquis of Villaviciosa de Asturias (Spanish: Marqués de Villaviciosa de Asturias) is a hereditary title in the Peerage of Spain, granted in 1892 by Maria Christina of Austria on behalf of her underage son Alfonso XIII to Pedro José Pidal, in recognition of his services and those of his father, Alejandro Pidal y Mon, President of the Congress of Deputies of Spain.

== Marquesses of Villaviciosa de Asturias (1892) ==
- Pedro Pidal y Bernaldo de Quirós, 1st Marquis of Villaviciosa de Asturias
- Santiago Pidal y Guilhou, 2nd Marquis of Villaviciosa de Asturias
- Pedro Pidal y Nano, 3rd Marquis of Villaviciosa de Asturias

== See also ==
- Spanish nobility
