= Luis Pidal y Mon =

Spanish politician and diplomat

Luis Pidal
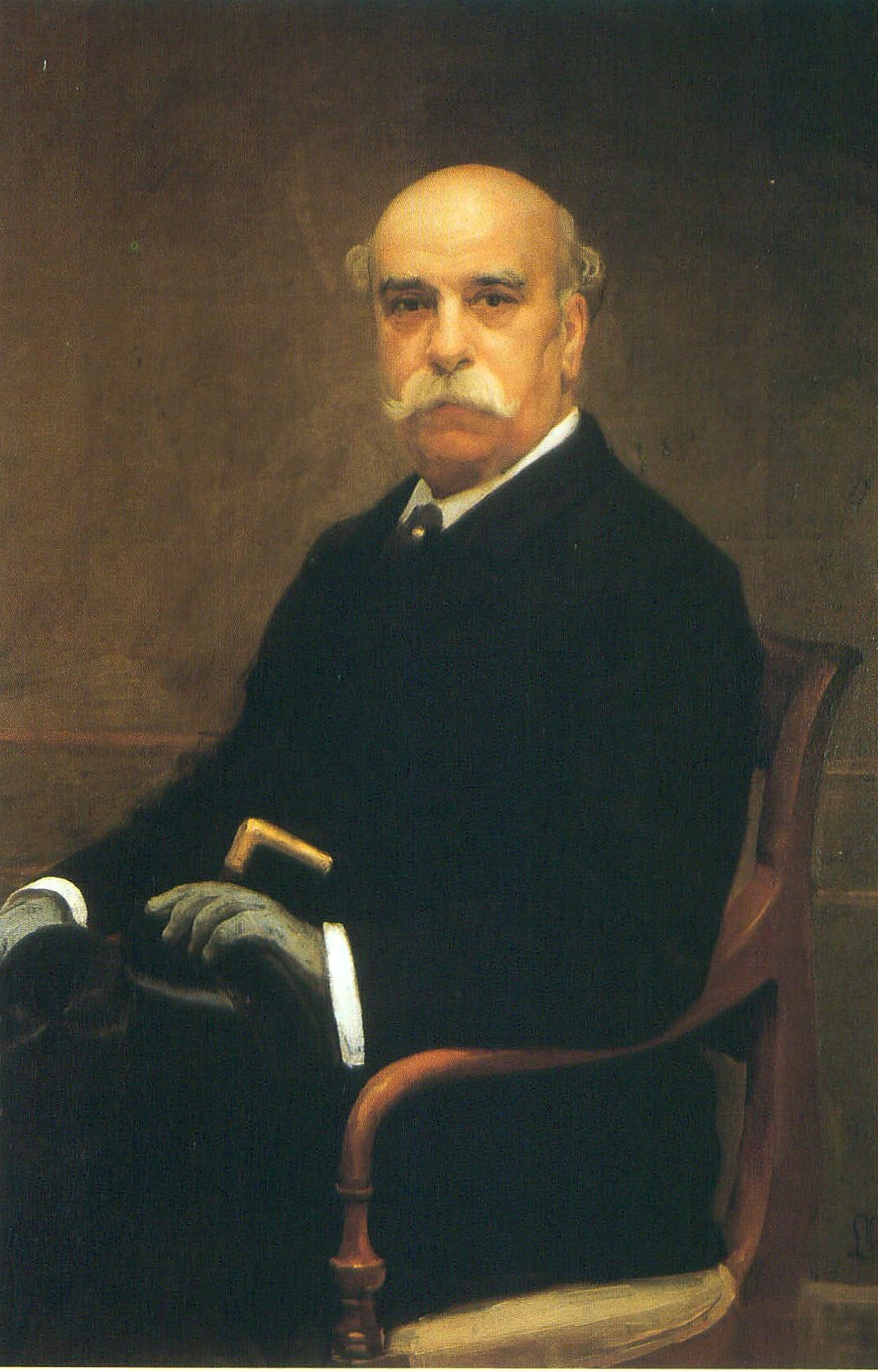
- Pidal painted by Luis Menéndez Pidal

President of the Senate
- In office 19 December 1904 – 17 August 1905
- Preceded by: Marcelo Azcárraga
- Succeeded by: José López Domínguez

Seat A of the Royal Spanish Academy
- In office 3 March 1895 – 19 December 1913
- Preceded by: Agustín Pascual González
- Succeeded by: Juan Menéndez Pidal

Personal details
- Born: Luis Pidal y Mon; 7 February 1842 Madrid, Spain
- Died: 19 December 1913 (aged 71) Madrid, Spain

Luis Pidal y Mon, 2nd Marquess of Pidal (Madrid, 7 February 1842 – Madrid, 19 December 1913) was a Spanish politician and diplomat who held relevant position during the reign of Alfonso XIII.

== Biography ==
He was the eldest son of the politician and academic Pedro José Pidal y Carniado, 1st Marquess of Pidal and Manuela Mon y Menéndez.

He studied law at the Central University of Madrid and Rome. Like his brother Alejandro Pidal y Mon, he was ultra-conservative and monarchist. He fiercely resisted the Glorious Revolution of 1868 and accompanied the new King Alfonso XII on his journey from England, in order to take possession of the new crown after the Bourbon Restoration in 1874.

In 1877 he replaced his maternal uncle Alejandro Mon y Menéndez, when he was elected deputy in the 1876 Spanish general election in his seat in Oviedo, and would keep his seat in the subsequent elections of 1879, 1881, 1884 and 1886.

In 1887 he entered the Royal Academy of Moral and Political Sciences (medal 32) replacing Antonio de los Ríos Rosas. In 1884 he was appointed Academician of the Royal Spanish Academy, although he did not take office until 1895 with the speech El drama histórico.

He was Spanish Ambassador to the Holy See in 1890 and appointed Minister of Public Works during the first government of Francisco Silvela in March 1899. He was the author of the secondary education reform that was harshly criticized by the liberals. In April 1901 he was replaced by Rafael Gasset Chinchilla.

He later was President of the Senate in 1905 and of the Council of State between 1907 and 1909.

He died in Madrid on 19 December 1913, having just been named a Knight of the Royal Order of the Golden Fleece.

=== Marriage and children ===
He was married in 1887 to Cristina Chico de Guzmán, daughter of Senator Alfonso Chico de Guzmán y Belmonte. They had 4 children, including María de las Maravillas de Jesús (1891–1974), one of the great mystics of the twentieth century.
