= Alejandro Pidal y Mon =

Spanish statesman

Alejandro Pidal
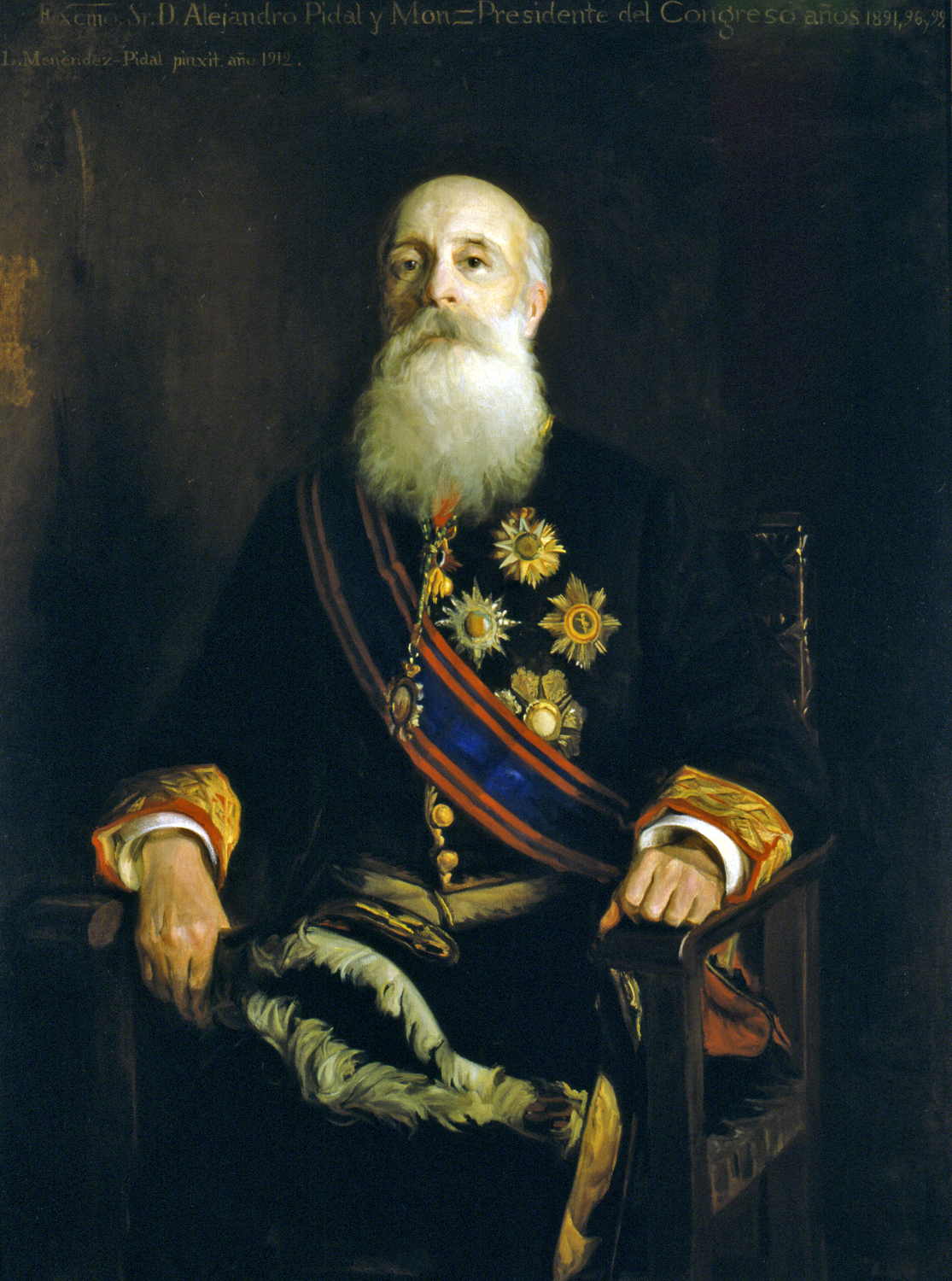
- Pidal in 1912, painted by Luis Menéndez Pidal

Minister of Development
- In office 18 January 1884 – 27 November 1885
- Preceded by: Ángel Carvajal y Fernández de Córdoba
- Succeeded by: Eugenio Montero Ríos

President of the Congress of Deputies
- In office 3 March 1891 – 5 January 1893
- Preceded by: Manuel Alonso Martínez
- Succeeded by: Antonio Aguilar y Correa
- In office 12 May 1896 – 26 February 1898
- Preceded by: Antonio Aguilar y Correa
- Succeeded by: Antonio Aguilar y Correa
- In office 3 June 1899 – 18 October 1900
- Preceded by: Antonio Aguilar y Correa
- Succeeded by: Raimundo Fernández-Villaverde

Ambassador to the Holy See
- In office 5 November 1900 – 18 January 1902
- Preceded by: Rafael Carlos Merry del Val
- Succeeded by: José Gutiérrez de Agüera

Director of the Real Academia Española
- In office 22 November 1906 – 19 October 1913
- Preceded by: Juan de la Pezuela y Cevallos
- Succeeded by: Antonio Maura

Seat V of the Real Academia Española
- In office 29 April 1883 – 19 October 1913
- Preceded by: Joaquín Ignacio Mencos
- Succeeded by: Miguel Echegaray

Personal details
- Born: Alejandro Pidal y Mon; 26 August 1846 Madrid, Spain
- Died: 19 October 1913 (aged 67) Madrid, Spain

Alejandro Pidal y Mon (Madrid, 26 August 1846 – Madrid, 19 October 1913) was a Spanish statesman and President of the Congress of Deputies of Spain during 5 non-consecutive years.

== Biography ==
He was the second son of Asturian politician Pedro José Pidal and Manuela Mon y Menéndez, sister of Prime Minister Alejandro Mon y Menéndez. His elder brother was Luis Pidal y Mon, also a politician and academic.

He graduated from the San Isidro Institute and the Law School of the Central University of Madrid. He joined a group of Neo-Catholics and, together with a number of like-minded people, founded the weekly magazine La Cruzada in 1867.

In August 1872, he was elected to the Congress of Deputies for the first time. He was actively involved in legislative work on issues of the Catholic Church and the abolition of slavery in Puerto Rico. He was not elected to the Constituent Assembly of the First Spanish Republic, but in 1876 he became a deputy again after the Restoration of the Bourbon dynasty. From that moment until the end of his life, he was re-elected in a total of fifteen elections, adhering to conservative Catholic views.

In 1881, he was one of the founders of the "Catholic Union", which sought to unite all Catholics in Spain, including Carlists. At the end of the year, in Rome, he met with Pope Leo XIII and then with King Alfonso XII, who were interested in attracting Spanish Catholics to their policies.

In 1883, he was elected a full member of the Spanish Royal Academy.

In 1884–1885 he was appointed Minister of Development. He paid special attention to education issues, signed a resolution directed against the reformist aspirations of university representatives, and also initiated the expansion of the public works system and the construction of a railway through the Puerto de Pajares.

In April 1891 he was elected President of the Congress of Deputies. He held the presidency until 12 December 1892. He would be president for a second time from 12 May 1896 to 1 July 1897, and for a third time from 3 June 1899 to 3 April 1900. On 5 November of that same year he was appointed Spanish Ambassador to the Holy See. On 18 January 1902, he resigned as ambassador in response to the draft amendment to change the Concordat, promoted by the Sagasta government, and returned to Madrid.

In 1906, despite attacks from a number of media outlets, he was appointed director of the Royal Spanish Academy. He was the author of two major monographs, on Thomas Aquinas and "The Triumph of the Jesuits in France" (1880). He was also a member of the Royal Academy of Jurisprudence and Legislation and of the Royal Academy of Moral and Political Sciences.

He received the Order of the Golden Fleece, the Order of St. Gregory the Great, as well as numerous national and foreign decorations.
Alejandro Pidal y Mon died on 19 October 1913 in Madrid, and was buried in Covadonga in Asturias.

=== Marriage and children ===
In 1868 he married Ignacia Bernaldo de Quirós y González-Cienfuegos, daughter of the Marquis of Camposagrado, with whom he would have fifteen children, of whom thirteen survived, including :

- Pedro Pidal, 1st Marquess of Villaviciosa de Asturias (1870–1941).
