= Manuel José Quintana =

Spanish poet and belletrist

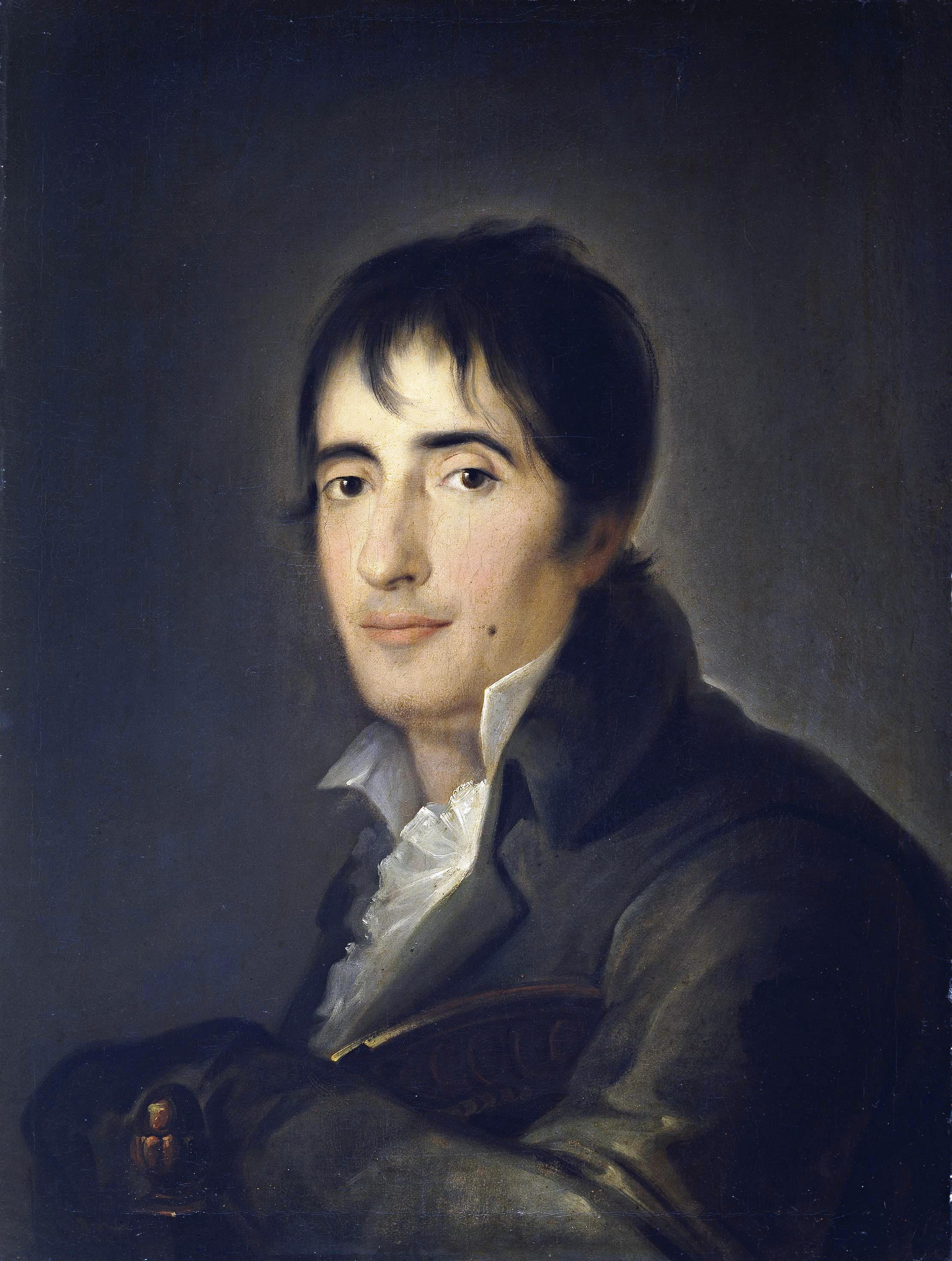
- Portrait by José Ribelles (1806)
- Born: Manuel José Quintana y Lorenzo; 11 April 1772; Madrid, Spain
- Died: 11 March 1857 (aged 84); Madrid, Spain
- Writing career
- Genre: poetry

Seat J of the Real Academia Española
- In office 1 March 1814 – 11 March 1857
- Preceded by: Vicente Vera de Aragón
- Succeeded by: Leopoldo Augusto de Cueto

Manuel José Quintana y Lorenzo (April 11, 1772 - March 11, 1857), was a Spanish poet and man of letters.

== Life ==
He was born at Madrid. After completing his studies at Salamanca he was called to the bar. In 1801 Quintana produced a tragedy, El Duque de Viseo, founded on M. G. Lewis's Castle Spectre; his Pelayo (1805), written on a patriotic theme, was more successful.

The first volume of his Vidas de Españoles célebres, containing lives of Spanish patriots, stirred the public imagination and secured Quintana the post of secretary to the Cortes during the French invasion. His proclamations and odes fanned the national enthusiasm into flame. But he was ill rewarded for his services, for on the return of Ferdinand VII he was imprisoned at Pamplona from 1814 to 1820. He was finally given a small post in the civil service, became tutor to Queen Isabella II, and was nominated senator. Though publicly crowned as the representative poet of Spain (1855), he seems to have lived in poverty.

Quintana died at the age of 84. His poems, thirty-four in number, are inspired by philanthropy and patriotism; the style is occasionally gallicized, and the thought is not profound, but his nobility of sentiment and resounding rhetoric attract many generations of Spaniards.

== Sources ==
- Albert Dérozier: "Les étapes de la vie officielle de Manuel Josef Quintana". Bulletin Hispanique 66 (1964): 363-383
- Albert Dérozier: Manuel Josef Quintana et la naissance du libéralisme en Espagne. 2 vols. Paris: Les belles Lettres, 1968-70. Annales littéraires de l'Université de Besançon, 95, 105.
- Albert Dérozier: Manuel José Quintana y el nacimiento del liberalismo en España / Albert Dérozier. Trad.: Manuel Moya. Madrid: Turner, 1978.
- Diego Martínez Torrón: Manuel José Quintana y el espíritu de la España liberal (con textos desconocidos). Sevilla: Ed. Alfar, 1995. ISBN 84-7898-106-3.
- E. Mérimée: "Les poésies liriques de Quintana." Bulletin Hispanique 4 (1902): 119-153.
- José A. Valero: "Manuel José Quintana y el sublime moral." Hispanic Review 71 (2003): 585-611
