= Leopoldo Augusto de Cueto, 1st Marquis of Valmar =

Spanish noble, writer, diplomat and politician

The Most Excellent Leopoldo Augusto de Cueto 1st Marquis of Valmar
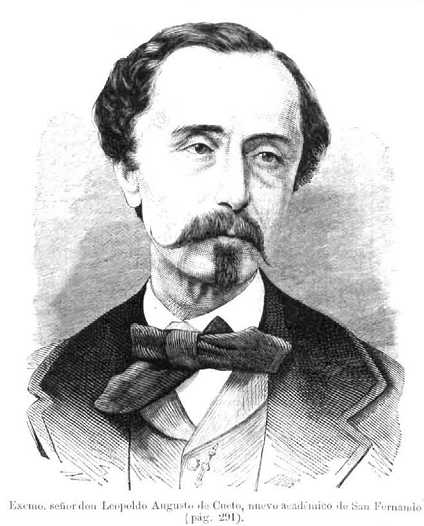
- Augusto de Cueto in 1872

Minister of State
- In office 15 October 1857 – 25 October 1857
- Monarch: Isabella II
- Prime Minister: Francisco Armero
- Preceded by: Pedro José Pidal
- Succeeded by: Francisco Martínez de la Rosa

Seat J of the Real Academia Española
- In office 14 March 1858 – 12 January 1901
- Preceded by: Manuel José Quintana
- Succeeded by: Juan José Herranz

Personal details
- Born: Leopoldo Augusto de Cueto y López de Ortega; 16 July 1815 Cartagena, Spain
- Died: 12 January 1901 (aged 85) Madrid, Spain

Leopoldo Augusto de Cueto y López de Ortega, 1st Marquis of Valmar (16 July 1815 – 12 January 1901) was a Spanish noble, writer, diplomat and politician.

He was born in Cartagena, Spain. He served as Minister of State in 1857. He died in Madrid, aged 85.

Political offices
Preceded by The Marquis of Pidal	Minister of State; 15 October 1857 – 25 October 1857	Succeeded by Francisco Martínez de la Rosa
