= Agustín Pascual González =

Spanish politician and forest engineer

Agustín Pascual
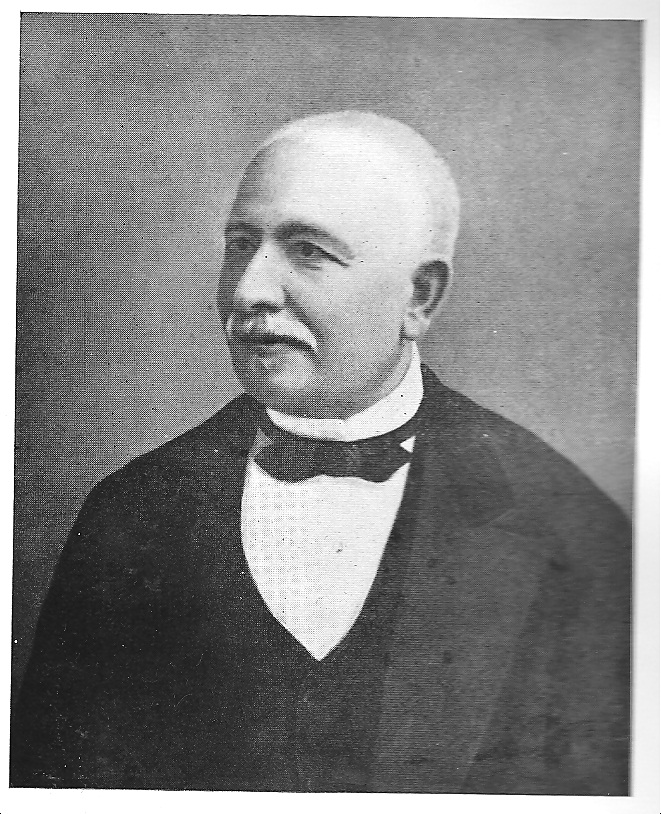
- Pascual, in a portrait kept in the Real Sociedad Económica Matritense de Amigos del País, Madrid.
- Born: Agustín Pascual González; 20 March 1818; Madrid, Spain
- Died: 23 October 1884 (aged 66); Madrid, Spain
- Occupations: Politician, forest engineer

Seat A of the Real Academia Española
- In office 30 April 1876 – 23 October 1884
- Preceded by: Severo Catalina
- Succeeded by: Luis Pidal y Mon

Agustín Pascual González (20 March 1818 – 23 October 1884) was a Spanish politician and forest engineer.

== Career ==
He was trained as a forest engineer in Saxony (at the Royal Saxon Academy of Forestry), where he learned from Heinrich Cotta. In 1848 he was the founder, and professor, of the Escuela de Montes de Villaviciosa de Odón. Here he was a colleague of the professor and forestry engineer Miguel Bosch. Among his students were figures like Máximo Laguna.

From 1845 to 1868, he was responsible for the management of forests of the Royal House of Spain, among which were forested areas such as Monte de El Pardo and Casa de Campo. In 1854, he was appointed member of the royal council of agriculture, industry and commerce. He was director of the Real Sociedad Económica Matritense de Amigos del País and member of the Senate.

== Honors ==
He was an academic at the Royal Spanish Academy between 1871 and 1884.

== Major works ==
- El bosque de Tharand, 1863.
