= Dióscoro Puebla =

Spanish painter (1831–1901)

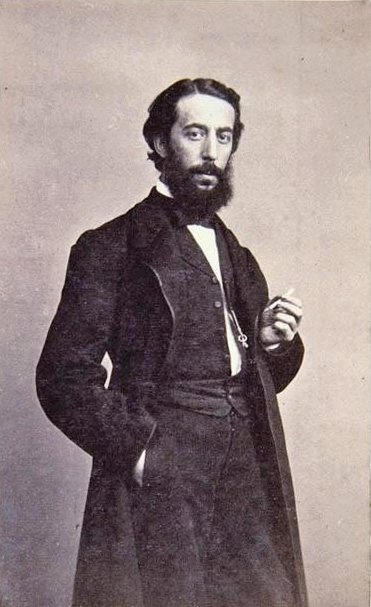
- Photograph by Jean Laurent, c.1860
- Born: 25 February 1831; Melgar de Fernamental, Spain
- Died: 24 October 1901 (aged 70); Madrid, Spain
- Education: Real Academia de Bellas Artes de San Fernando, Madrid
- Occupation: Painter

Dióscoro Teófilo Puebla Tolín (25 February 1831 – 24 October 1901) was a Spanish painter in the Eclectic style who specialized in portraits, genre and history painting.

== Biography ==
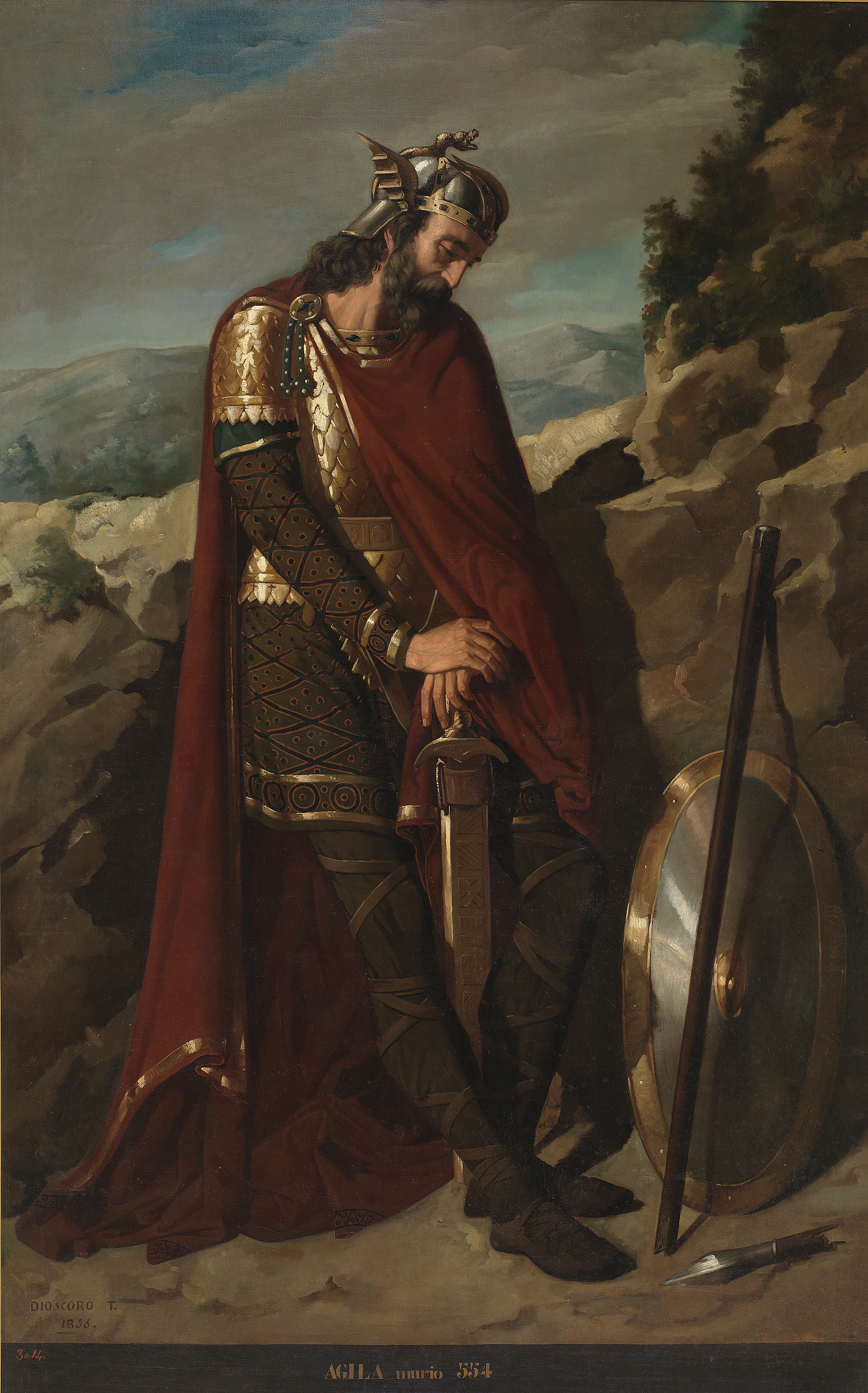
Agila I, King of the Visigoths, (1856)

Puebla was born in Melgar de Fernamental, Spain. His first studies took place in the public schools of Carrión de los Condes, where he displayed his talent for drawing. This led to his enrollment at the new "Escuela Municipal de Dibujo de Palencia", which had been created in 1838 and ultimately produced many well-known Spanish artists, including José Casado del Alisal, Eugenio Oliva and Asterio Mañanós Martínez. In 1845, he enrolled at the Real Academia de Bellas Artes de San Fernando in Madrid, where he studied with José de Madrazo and Carlos Luis de Ribera y Fieve.

After completing his course in Madrid he was able to perfect his art by travelling to Rome, thanks to a competitive grant awarded by the Ministry of Public Works; 12,000 Reales per year for three years, beginning in 1858. While there, he became part of the group of Spanish painters who gathered at the Antico Caffè Greco. The grant was later extended for two years, enabling him to visit other parts of Italy.

=== Academic career ===
Upon returning to Spain in 1863, he was named Professor of Color and Composition at the Real Academia Provincial de Bellas Artes de Cádiz, but served for only a short time before he was given a Royal Appointment to the Academy of San Fernando and took his place there in 1865.

On several occasions over the next twenty-five years, he sat on juries created by the Ministry of State to evaluate candidates for positions at the new "Academia Española de Bellas Artes de Roma". In 1869, he was named an officer in the Order of Isabella the Catholic and Order of Charles III. He also exhibited widely, participating in the Weltausstellung 1873 Wien and the Centennial Exposition in Philadelphia, among others.

In 1882, he was chosen to be an "Academician" by his peers at San Fernando and, in 1897, he became the Director of the "School of Drawing, Painting and Engraving", succeeding Luis de Madrazo. He died in Madrid, aged 70.

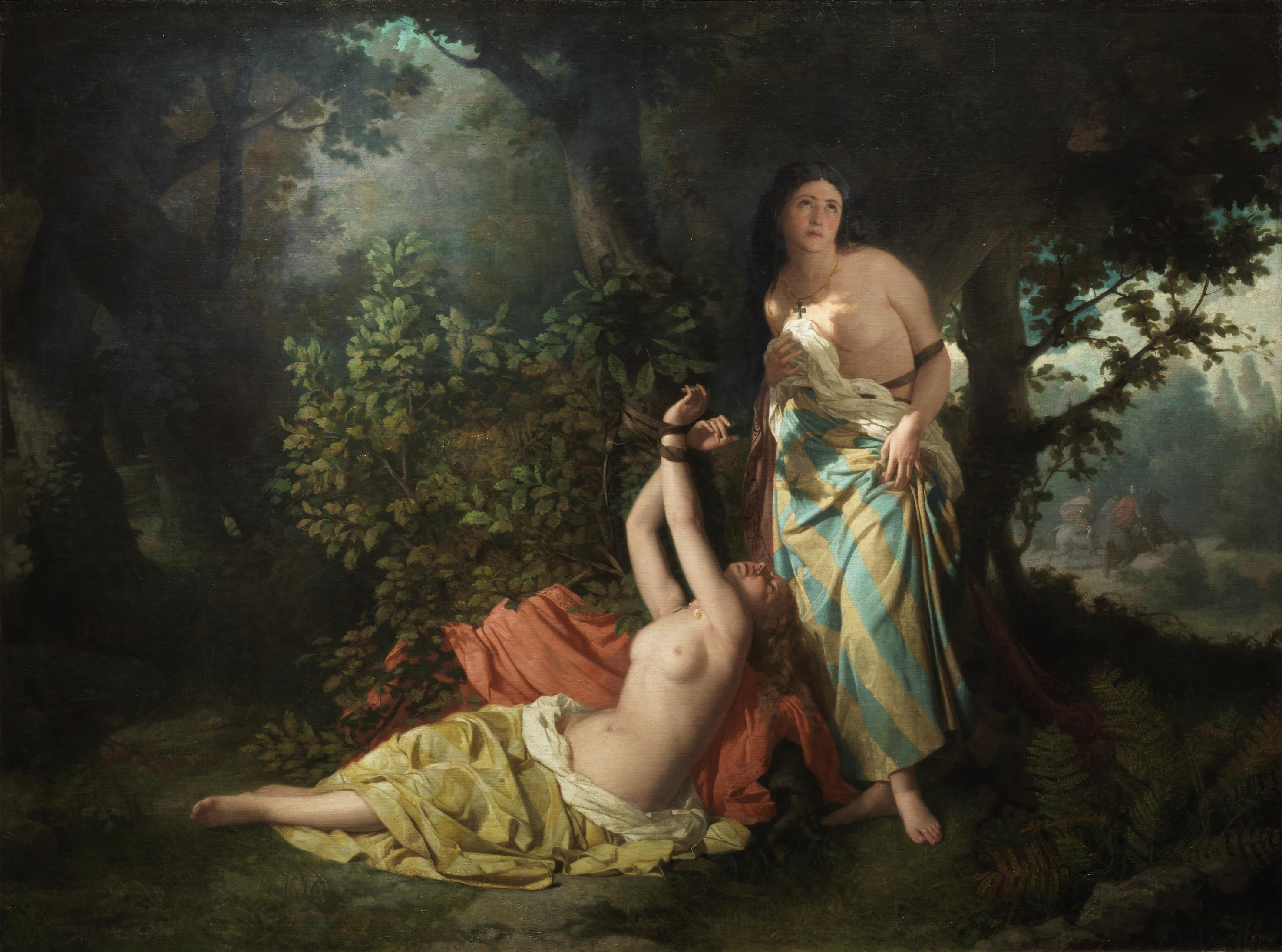
The Daughters of El Cid (1871)

Although his historical paintings were a relatively small portion of his output, they remain his best-known works. Many of his portraits are displayed in the Congress of Deputies in Spain, including those of Nicomedes Pastor Díaz and Pedro José Pidal.
