= Nicomedes Pastor Díaz y Corbelle =

Spanish politician, journalist, and author (1811–1863)

The Most Excellent Nicomedes Pastor Díaz
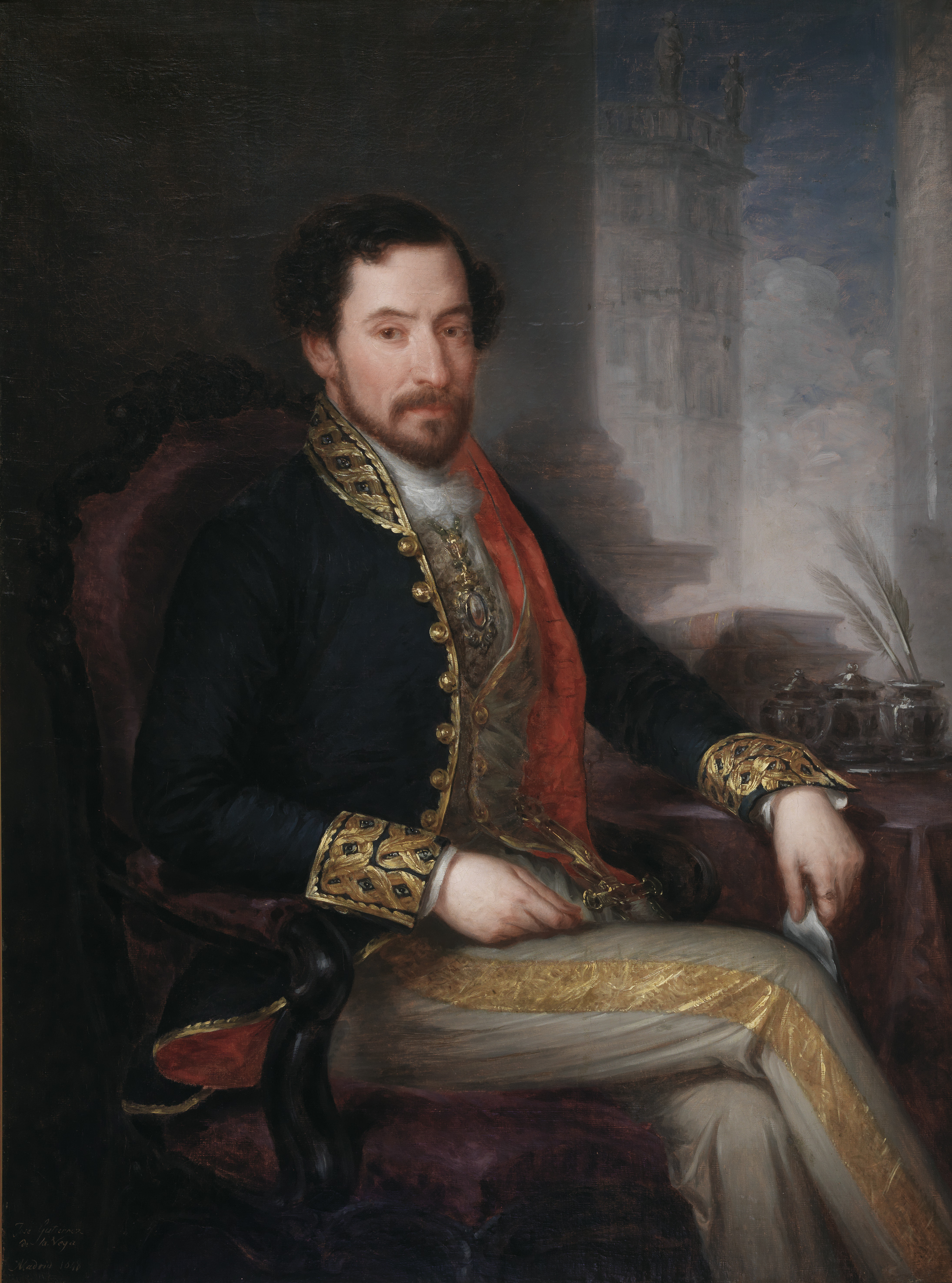
- Born: Nicomedes Pastor Díaz Corbelle; 15 September 1811; Viveiro, Spain
- Died: 22 March 1863 (aged 51); Madrid, Spain

Seat k of the Real Academia Española
- In office 7 November 1847 – 22 March 1863
- Preceded by: Seat established
- Succeeded by: Isaac Núñez de Arenas

Nicomedes Pastor Díaz Corbelle (15 September 1811, in Viveiro, Galicia, Spain – 22 March 1863, in Madrid, Spain) was a Spanish politician, journalist and author of the Romanticism and the Rexurdimento. He contributed to the renewal of the Galician language.

As a politician, Díaz served as Minister of State in 1856, during the reign of Queen Isabella II of Spain, in a cabinet headed by Leopoldo O'Donnell, 1st Duke of Tetuan (by then Count of Lucena).

Díaz was elected to seat k of the Real Academia Española, he took up his seat on 7 November 1847.

He was both a Liberal and a Catholic, belonging to the left wing of the Moderados. In 1863, as a member of the Liberal Union, he gave a speech on the necessity of reconciling Catholicism with Liberalism.

== Works ==
- Alborada (1828) (in Galician language)
- Poesías (1840)
- De Villahermosa a la China (1858)
- Galería de españoles célebres contemporáneos (1841-1864)

== Sources ==
- Biography of Nicomedes Pastor Díaz (in Spanish)

Political offices
Preceded by The Marquis of Sierra Bullones	Minister of State; 14 July 1856 – 12 October 1856	Succeeded by The Marquis of Pidal
