= Juan Menéndez Pidal =

Spanish historian and poet (1858–1915)

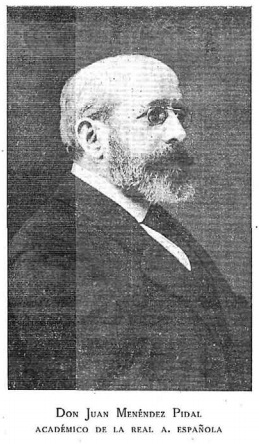
- Born: Juan Menéndez Pidal; 31 May 1858; Madrid, Spain
- Died: 28 December 1915 (aged 57); Madrid, Spain

Seat A of the Real Academia Española
- In office 24 January 1915 – 28 December 1915
- Preceded by: Luis Pidal y Mon
- Succeeded by: Mariano de Cavia (Note: de Cavia was elected for the position in 1916 but never took the seat)

Juan Menéndez Pidal (1858, in Madrid – 1915) was a Spanish archivist, jurisconsult, historian, and poet, brother of Luis and Ramón Menéndez Pidal. He was long a director of the Archivo Histórico Nacional at Madrid, and a director of the Revista de Archivos, Bibliotecas, y Museos.

Born in Madrid, he studied law until he obtained his title, and then devoted himself to journalism. His Dios y César, an ecclesiastical and legal study of the relation of church and state, attracted much attention. In 1914 he was elected a member of the Spanish Royal Academy of the Language.

== See also ==
- List of archivists
