= Christopher Columbus House =

Building in Genoa, Italy

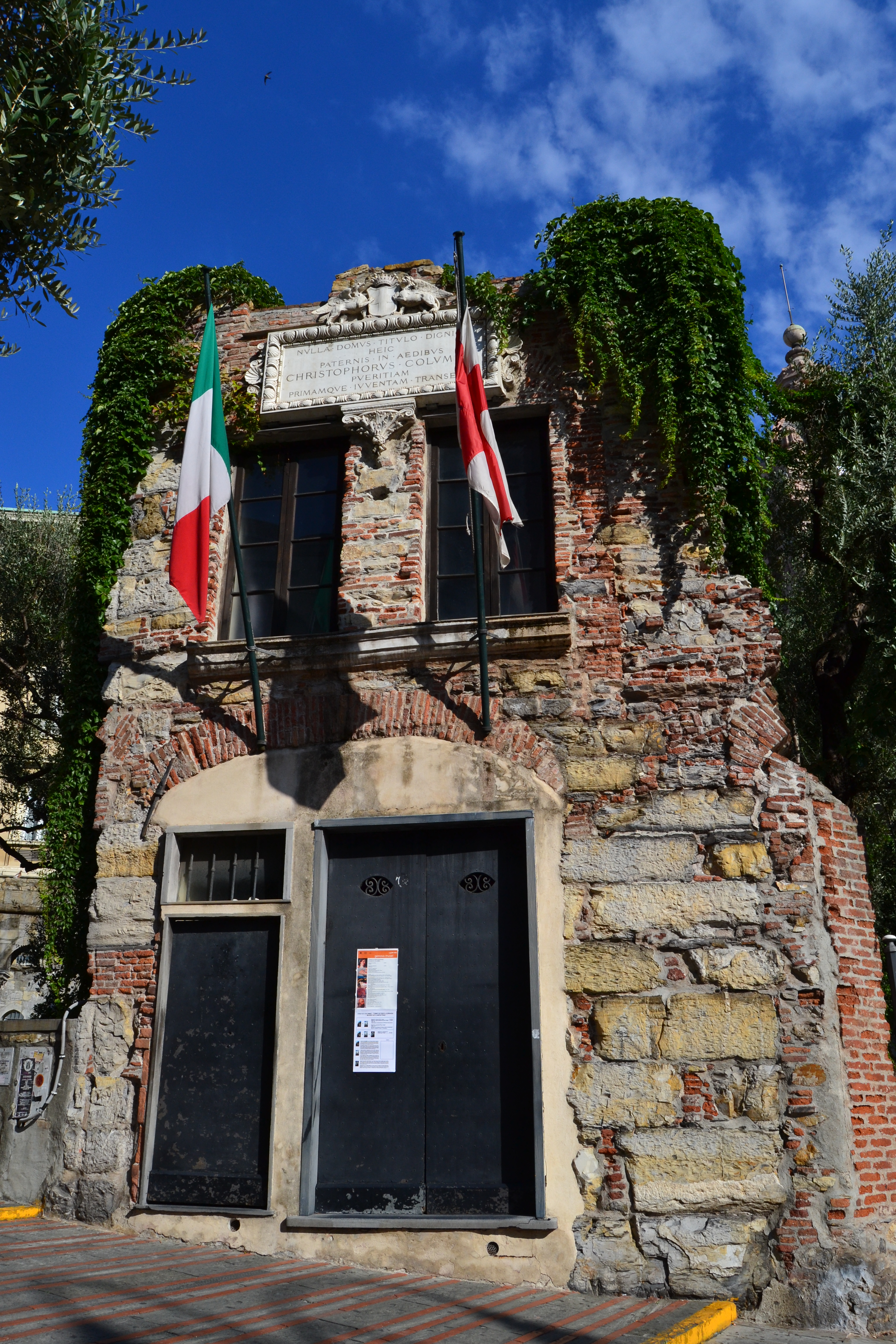

The Christopher Columbus House in Genoa, Italy, is an 18th-century reconstruction of the house in which Christopher Columbus grew up.

== Description ==
The house is located outside Genoa's 14th-century walls. During the Renaissance, the area became subject to intense building, mainly consisting of public housing.

Columbus was born in 1451, and historical documents indicated that Columbus lived here between approximately 1455, and 1470. At this time, the house had two or maybe three stories, with a shop on the ground floor, and the front door to the left of the shop.

According to historian Marcello Staglieno, the original house was most likely destroyed in the French Bombardment of Genoa in 1684. It was rebuilt in the early 18th century on the basis of the original ruins. The rebuilt structure had a height of five stories. However, the upper stories were built by placing their beams on the neighboring buildings. When the neighboring buildings were demolished around 1900, as part of the construction of Via XX Settembre, the upper stories of this building were removed, and it was reduced to its current height of two stories.

Currently the building operates as a museum, under the management of the "Porta Soprana" Genovese cultural association. Its central location and nearby parking make it a popular meeting place for the Genovese.

== See also ==
- List of monuments and memorials to Christopher Columbus
