= Pedro Pidal, 1st Marquis of Villaviciosa de Asturias =

Spanish writer and journalist

The Most Excellent The Marquis of Villaviciosa de Asturias MP
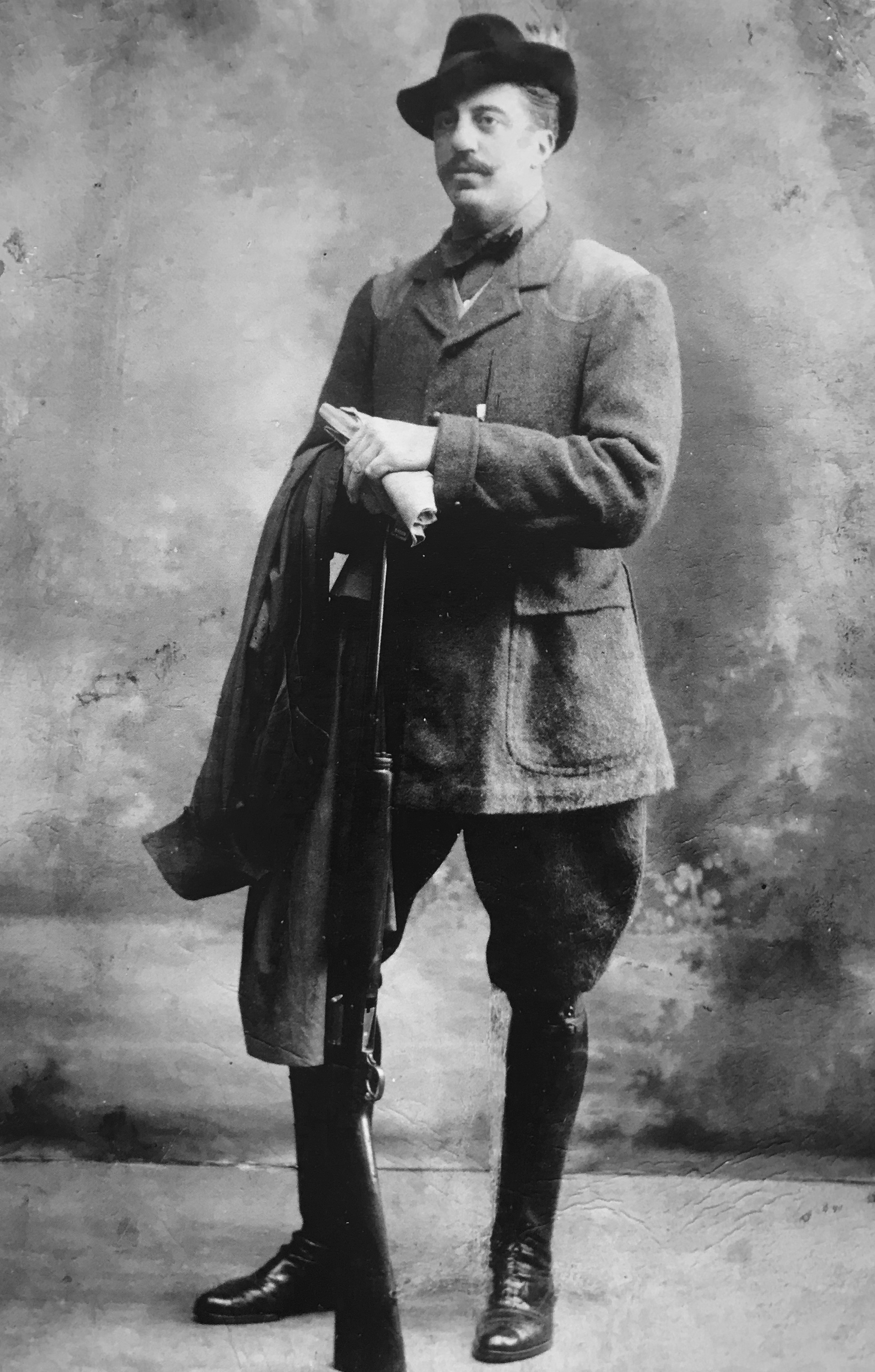
- Pictured in 1918

Personal details
- Born: Pedro José Pidal y Bernaldo de Quirós; 2 November 1870 Somió, Spain
- Died: 17 November 1941 (aged 71) Gijón, Spain
- Spouse: Jacoba Guilhou y Georgeault (m. 1892)
- Children: 5
- Parents: Alejandro Pidal y Mon (father); Ignacia Bernaldo de Quirós y González de Cienfuegos (mother)

Medal record

~~Live pigeon shoot~~

Representing Spain

Olympic Games
Silver medal – second place	1900 Paris	Individual competition

Pedro José Pidal y Bernaldo de Quirós, 1st Marquis of Villaviciosa de Asturias, MP (2 November 1870 – 17 November 1941) was a Spanish peer, politician, mountaineer, writer, famed hunter and Olympic medalist. A visionary in the field of conservationism, he engineered the creation of Picos de Europa National Park in 1918 and was the first person to reach the summit of Naranjo de Bulnes, in 1904.

Pidal took second place in pigeon shooting at the 1900 Summer Olympics, an event now considered unofficial (the IOC has never decided which events were "Olympic" and which were not). As a politician, he was a member of parliament for Belmonte de Miranda and Luarca, and was made senator for life in 1914.

== Early life ==
He was born in Somió as the first child of 12, son of Alejandro Pidal y Mon, who was President of the Congress of Deputies, Minister of Development and Director of the Royal Spanish Academy. His mother was Ignacia Bernaldo de Quirós, the daughter of the 7th Marquess of Campo Sagrado.

== Hunting ==
During his hunting career, he bagged five Cantabrian brown bears, a species he was one of the biggest experts in. Pidal was predominantly a mountain hunter, and enjoyed stalking rebecos and sarrios as well.

He is one of only four who have hunted all big-game species of the Spanish fauna (including the Iberian lynx and bear), the other three being the 11th Marquess of Valdueza, Carlos Rein and Infanta Alicia of Spain.

He died in Gijón on 17 November 1941.

== Issue ==
On 10 October 1892, he married Jacqueline Guilhou, the daughter of Jean Antoine Numa Guilhou, a prominent French businessman. The ceremony took place at the chapel of the Mieres steel factory. They had five children:

- María Pidal y Guilhou
- Santiago Pidal y Guilhou, 2nd Marquess of Villaviciosa de Asturias (1894-1962)
- Pedro Pidal y Guilhou
- Alejandro Pidal y Guilhou
- Enrique Pidal y Guilhou

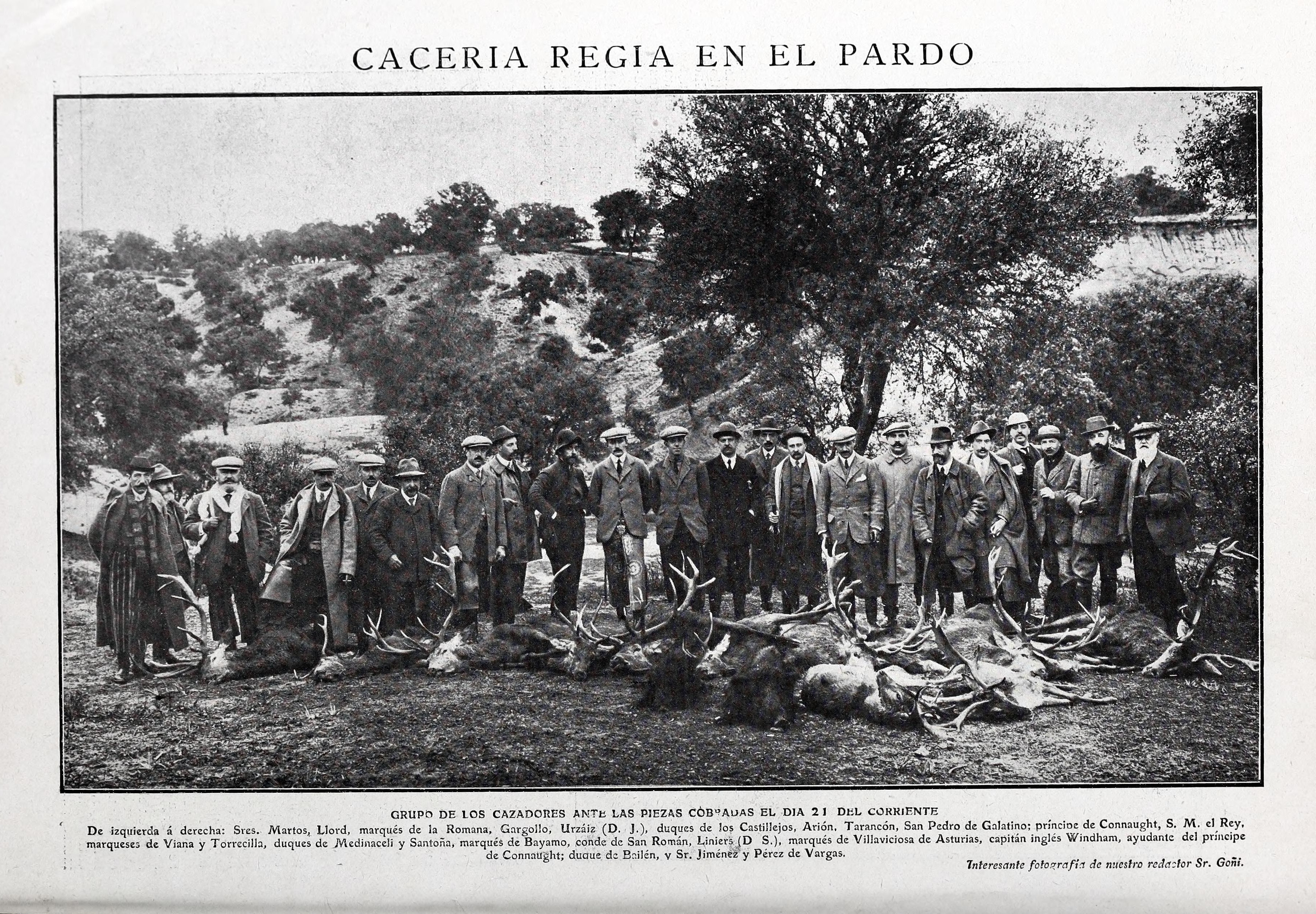
Royal montería with Prince Arthur and Alfonso XIII at El Pardo in 1908. Pidal is the fourth from the right

== Titles ==
- 1st Marquess of Villaviciosa de Asturias

== Selected works ==
- La Caza del Oso en Asturias, KRK Ediciones, Oviedo, 1900.
- Picos de Europa: Contribución al Estudio de las Montañas Españolas, Ediciones Noega, Madrid, 1918.

== See also ==
- List of big-game hunters

== Bibliography ==
- Priego, Count of (2017). Cazadores Españoles del Siglo XX. Turner Publicaciones. ISBN 978-84-16714-29-2.

Spanish nobility
Preceded by New creation	Marquis of Villaviciosa de Asturias; 1892 – 1941	Succeeded by Santiago Pidal y Guilhou
