= Luis Menéndez Pidal =

Spanish painter

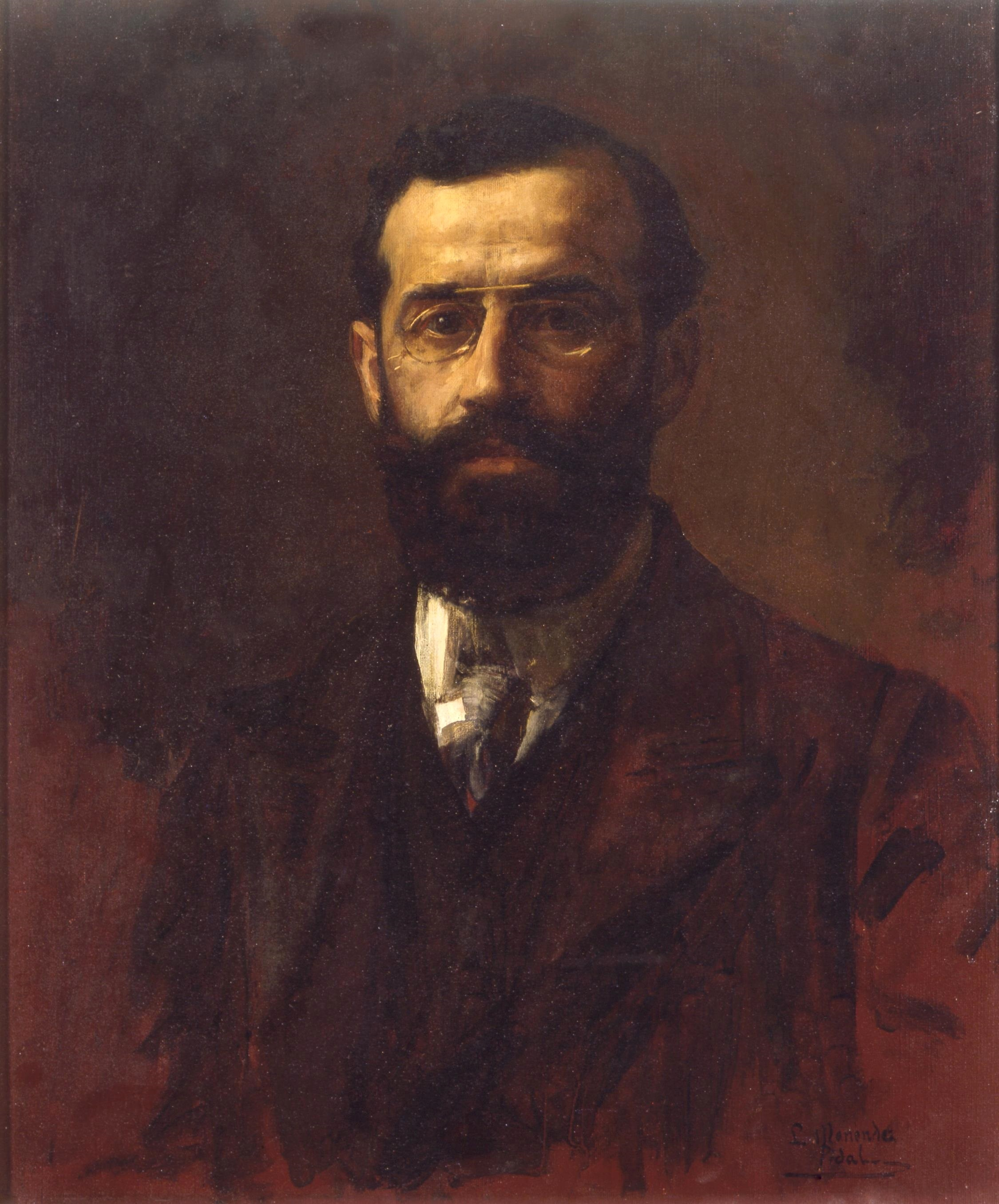
Self-portrait (1907)

Luis Menéndez Pidal (8 August 1861, in Pajares – 7 February 1932, in Madrid) was a Spanish painter; primarily of genre scenes.

== Biography ==
His father, Juan Menéndez Fernández, was a magistrate. His brothers, Juan and Ramón, became noted historians and writers.

During his childhood, his family moved frequently; a requirement of his father's profession. Although he wanted to be a painter, his father insisted that he study law and he completed his degree at the University of Oviedo in 1884.

During this time, however, he also took classes at the "Escuela de Bellas Artes de San Salvador" and, in 1885, enrolled at the "Escuela Superior de Pintura" (a branch of the Real Academia de Bellas Artes de San Fernando) in Madrid, where he studied with Alejandro Ferrant.

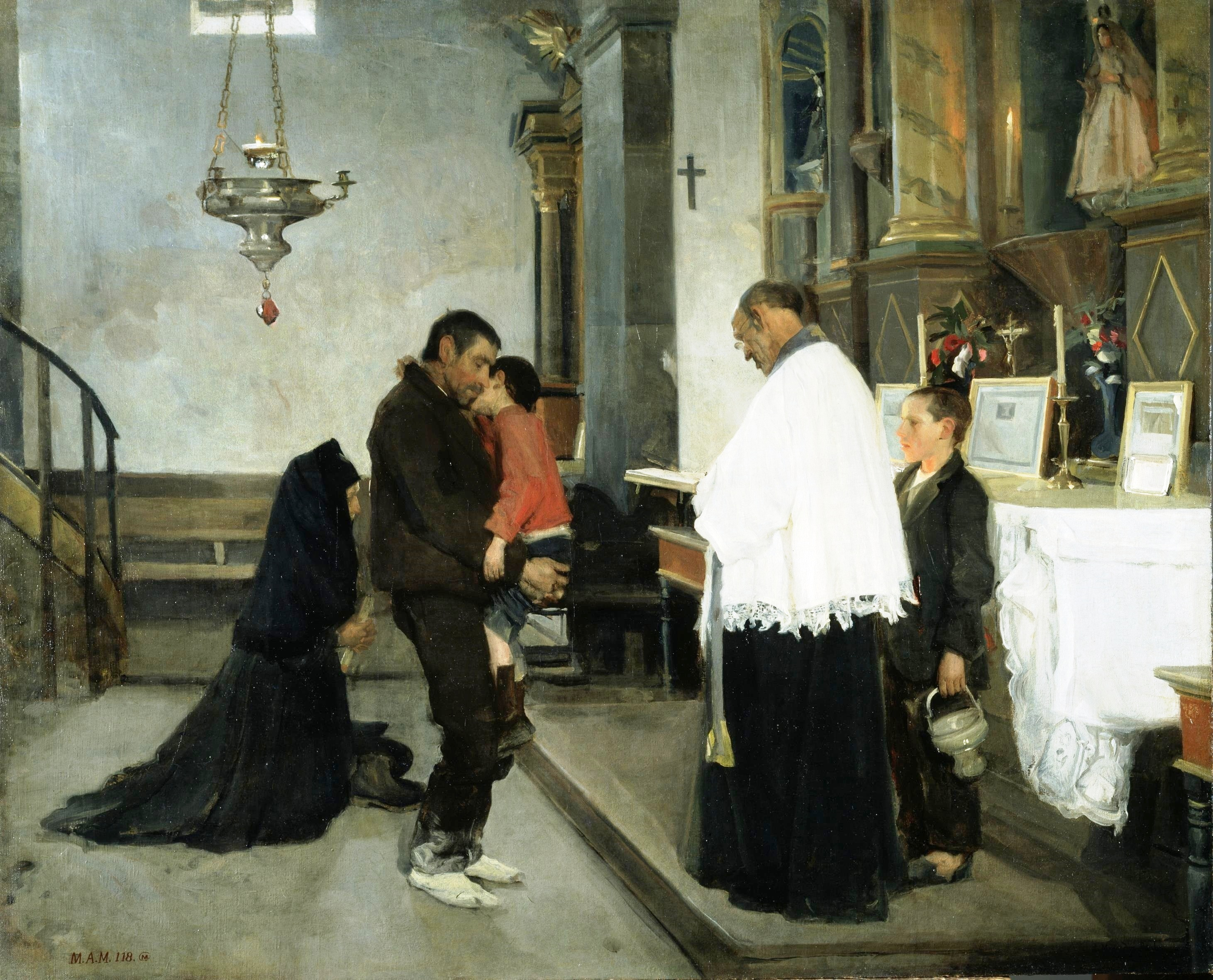
Salus Infirmorum

Thanks to a grant, he was able to continue his studies in Italy, where he worked with José Villegas Cordero and Francisco Pradilla in Rome, then spent some time in Florence at the Accademia Ussi. He returned to Spain in 1888.

At the 1890 National Exhibition of Fine Arts, he was awarded a second-class medal for his painting called "A buen juez, mejor testigo" (A good judge is the best witness) and some of his works were purchased by the Regent, María Cristina.

In 1892, he was married and settled permanently in Madrid. In 1892 and 1899, he was awarded first-class medals for "La cuna vacía" (The empty cradle) and "Salus infirmorun" (Salvation of the sick), respectively. He was named a Professor at the "Escuela Superior de Artes Industriales" in 1900. The following year, he moved to the "Escuela de Artes y Oficios Artísticos", in charge of decorative painting.

In 1907, he helped organize the room devoted to Diego Velázquez at the Museo del Prado and succeeded to the Chair of Drawing at the San Fernando Academy; a position he held until he retired at the age of seventy. He died a few months later.

His son, Luis Menéndez Pidal y Álvarez, was an architect and building restorer.
