= Tagle =

- Language: Spanish, Portuguese, Arabic

Origin
- Meaning: Frontier
- Region of origin: Spain, Portugal

Tagle is a Spanish surname originating from a place in Santander province.

== List of persons with the surname ==
- Luis Sánchez de Tagle, 1st Marquis of Altamira (1642–1710) Spanish aristocrat
- Luisa Pérez de Tagle, 4th Marquesa of Altamira (1715–1736), Spanish-Mexican aristocrat
- Manuel Rodriguez de Albuerne y Pérez de Tagle, 5th Marquis of Altamira (1733–1791), Spanish-Mexican aristocrat
- Manuela Sánchez de Tagle, 3rd Marquesa of Altamira, Spanish-Mexican aristocrat
- Pedro Sánchez de Tagle, 2nd Marquis of Altamira (1661–1723), Spanish aristocrat
- Anna Maria Perez de Taglé (born 1990), American actress and singer
- Bárbara Ruiz-Tagle (born 1979), Chilean actress of theater and television
- Carlos Ruiz-Tagle (1932–1991), Chilean writer
- Eduardo Frei Ruiz-Tagle (born 1942), Chilean politician and civil engineer, President of Chile 1994–2000
- Francisco Ruiz-Tagle (1790–1860), Chilean political figure
- José María Hurtado Ruiz-Tagle (1945–2018), Chilean politician, member of the National Renewal (RN) party
- Sara Larraín Ruiz-Tagle (born 1952), Chilean politician and environmentalist, ran for president in 1999
- Alfonso Tagle, Sr or Panchito Alba (1925–1995), FAMAS award-winning Filipino film actor
- Hilda G. Tagle (born 1946), Senior United States District Judge in the Southern District of Texas
- José Bernardo de Tagle y Bracho, 1st Marquis of Torre Tagle (1644–1740), Peruvian aristocrat
- José Bernardo de Tagle y Portocarrero, Marquis of Torre Tagle (1779–1825), Peruvian soldier and politician
- Jose Tagle (1854–1902), roled in the Battle of Imus
- Luis Antonio Tagle (born 1957), Filipino Catholic Cardinal, Dean of the College of Cardinals
- Protasio Tagle, Mexican soldier and politician who lived in the 19th century
- Rosa Juliana Sánchez de Tagle, Marquesa of Torre Tagle (1647–1761), Peruvian aristocrat
- Sarita Pérez de Tagle (born 1986), Filipina cinema and television actress
- Juan Antonio de Tagle y Bracho, Count of Casa Tagle de Trasierra (1685–1750), Spanish/Peruvian aristocrat

== See also ==
- Tangle (disambiguation)
- Teagle (disambiguation)
