= Marquess of Altamira =

Crown of a Spanish Marquess

Marquess of Altamira is a Spanish noble title.

On 23 December 1702, King Philip V of Spain granted the title to Don Luis Sánchez de Tagle y de la Rasa, 1st Marquess of Altamira from the previous title of Viscount Tagle.

Famous members include Don Luis Sánchez de Tagle, 1st Marquess of Altamira who was once the most influential and richest man in New Spain, Don Pedro Sánchez de Tagle known as the "Father of Tequila" and first Empress of Mexico, Empress Ana Maria, who is the great great great grandniece of Don Luis Sánchez de Tagle. The holders of the title were all members of the House of Tagle, an aristocratic family in Spain and Mexico during the 17th, 18th and 19th centuries.

The members of the family also married into powerful Spanish nobles houses such as that of the Dukes of Moctezuma de Tultengo and the Dukes of Tetuán.

A cadet branch of the House of Tagle also established themselves in the Philippines, where they soon became one of that country's richest families. Having historical associations with the Principalia, the native aristocracy of the Philippines, some notable members of this branch are the socialite Isabel Preysler and the actress Anna Maria Perez de Tagle, who is Filipino-American and perhaps Cardinal Luis Antonio Gokim

== Viscounts of Tagle ==
1. Don Luis Sánchez de Tagle, Viscount Tagle (created Marquess of Altamira on 23 December 1702)
2. Don Juan Manuel Pérez de Tagle, Viscount Tagle (created Marquess of Salinas on 20 October 1733)

== Marquesses of Altamira ==
1. Don Luis Sánchez de Tagle, 1st Marquess of Altamira
2. Don Pedro Sánchez de Tagle, 2nd Marquess of Altamira, son-in-law and eldest son of the 1st Marquess' eldest brother
3. Doña Manuela Sánchez de Tagle, 3rd Marchioness of Altamira, eldest daughter of the 2nd Marquess
4. Doña Luisa Pérez de Tagle, 4th Marchioness of Altamira, only daughter of the 3rd Marquesa
5. Don Manuel Rodríguez de Albuerne y Pérez de Tagle, 5th Marquess of Altamira, eldest son of the 4th Marquesa
6. Doña María de la Paz Rodriguez de Albuerne y Girón, 6th Marchioness of Altamira, eldest daughter of the 5th Marquess
7. Doña Luisa Álvarez de Abreú y Rodríguez de Albuerne, 7th Marchioness of Altamira, eldest daughter of the 6th Marchionesse's youngest sister
8. Doña Maria del Mar Alvarez de Abreu y Rodriguez de Albuerne, 8th Marchioness of Altamira, only sister of the 7th Marchioness
9. Don Carlos Manuel O'Donnell y Álvarez de Abreú, 2nd Duke of Tetuan, 9th Marquess of Altamira and Grandee of Spain, eldest son of 8th Marchioness
10. Doña María de las Mercedes O'Donnell y Vargas, 10th Marquesa of Altamira, eldest daughter of the 9th Marquess
11. Doña María Victoria O'Donnell y Vargas, 11th Marquesa of Altamira, younger sister of the 10th Marchioness and daughter of the 9th Marquess
12. Don Federico Kirkpatrick y O'Donnell, 12th Marquess de Altamira, second son of the 11th Marchioness
13. Don Alfonso O' Donnell y Lara, 13th Marquess de Altamira, the 12th Marquess' cousin, second son of the 9th Marquess' 5th child
14. Don Hugo O'Donnell y Duque de Estrada, 7th Duke of Tetuan, 14th Marquess of Altamira and Grandee of Spain, nephew of the 13th Marquess
15. Don Carlos O'Donnell de Armada, 15th Marquess of Altamira and Grandee of Spain, eldest son of the 14th Marquess
