= José de Elduayen, 1st Marquess of the Pazo de la Merced =

Spanish statesman (1823–1898)

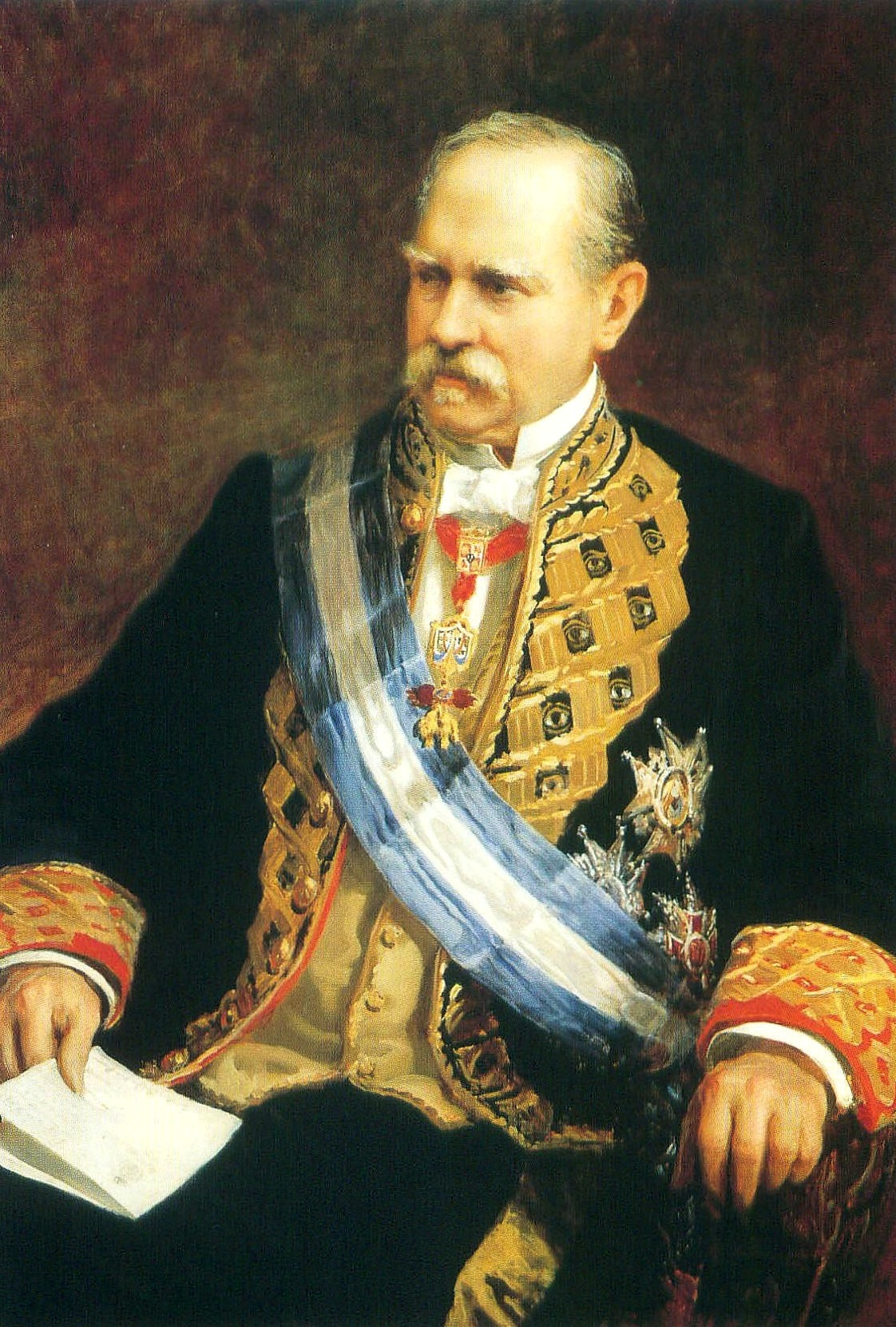
The Marquess of the Pazo de la Merced

José de Elduayen y Gorriti, 1st Marquess of the Pazo de la Merced (22 June 1823, in Madrid, Spain – 24 June 1898) was a Spanish statesman who served three times as Minister of State.

He was educated in the capital, took the degree of civil engineer, and as such directed important works in Asturias and Galicia, entered the Cortes in 1856 as deputy for Vigo, and sat in all the parliaments until 1867 as member of the Unión Liberal with Marshal O'Donnell.

He attacked the Miraflores cabinet in 1864, and became under-secretary of the home office when Cánovas was minister in 1865. He was made a councillor of state in 1866, and in 1868 assisted the other members of the Unión Liberal in preparing the revolution. In the Cortes of 1872 he took much part in financial debates. He accepted office as member of the last Sagasta cabinet under King Amadeus.

On the proclamation of the republic Elduayen very earnestly co-operated in the Alphonsist conspiracy, and endeavoured to induce the military and politicians to work together. He went abroad to meet and accompany the prince after the pronunciamiento of Marshal Campos, landed with him at Valencia, was made governor of Madrid, a marquis, grand cross of Charles III, and minister for the colonies in 1878.

He accepted the portfolio of foreign affairs in the Cánovas cabinet from 1883 to 1885, and was made a life senator. He always prided himself on having been one of the five members of the Cortes of 1870 who voted for Alfonso XII when that parliament elected Amadeus of Savoy. He died at Madrid on the 24 June 1898.

Political offices
Preceded by Antonio Cánovas del Castillo; Acting	Minister of State; 19 March 1880 – 8 February 1881	Succeeded by The Marquis of la Vega de Armijo
Preceded by Servando Ruiz-Gómez	Minister of State; 18 January 1884 – 27 November 1885	Succeeded by Segismundo Moret
Preceded by The Duke of Tetuan	Minister of State; 19 January 1896 – 5 March 1896	Succeeded by The Duke of Tetuan
