= Rosa Juliana Sánchez de Tagle, Marquesa of Torre Tagle =

Mexican noble

The Marquesa of Torre Tagle
- Marquesa of Torre Tagle
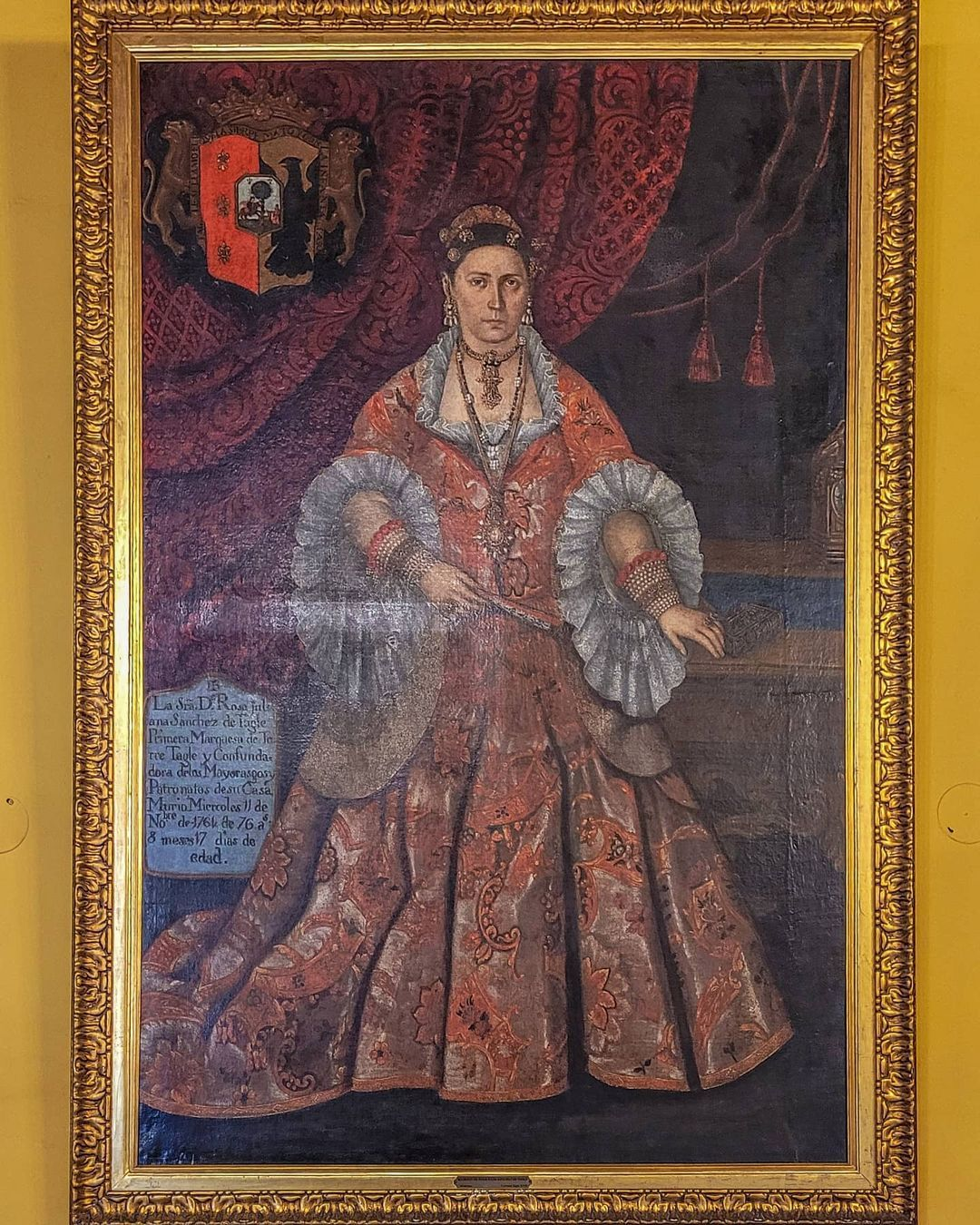
- Born: Rosa Juliana Sánchez de Tagle y Hidalgo; 1647; San Jerónimo de Sayán, Huaura, Lima, Peru
- Died: November 11, 1761
- Spouse: Don José Bernardo de Tagle-Bracho y Pérez de la Riva
- Issue: Tadeo José de Tagle-Bracho y Sánchez de Tagle (b. 1709); Serafina Agueda de Tagle-Bracho y Sánchez de Tagle (b. 1713); Francisco de Tagle-Bracho y Sánchez de Tagle (b. 1714 ) Pedro de Tagle-Bracho y Sánchez de Tagle(b. 1722)
- Parents: Francisco Sánchez de Tagle y Castro Velarde; María Josefa Hidalgo Sánchez y Velásquez Gómez

Rosa Juliana Sánchez de Tagle y Hidalgo, Marquesa of Torre Tagle (1647 – November 11, 1761) was a Peruvian aristocrat who descended from an important and influential Spanish aristocratic family which included the Marquis of Altamira. She also a shares the same ancestor as her husband the Marquis of Torre Tagle, as they both descended from the ancient line of Tagle founded in the Kingdom of Asturias.

Rosa Juliana was the daughter of Don Francisco Sánchez de Tagle y Castro Velarde and Doña María Josefa Hidalgo Sánchez y Velásquez Gómez, both Spanish Hidalgos. She was born is San Jerónimo de Sayán, Huaura, Lima, Peru on 1647.

She married Don José Bernardo de Tagle y Bracho, 1st Marquis of Torre Tagle at Parroquia el Sagrario de la Catedral de Lima in Peru, and lived at the exquisite Torre Tagle Palace.

Both Sánchez de Tagle y Hidalgo and Ana Maria, Empress of Mexico descended from the line of the Marquis of Altamira and members of the Tagle Family.
