= Servando Ruiz-Gómez y González-Llanos =

Spanish politician, lawyer, and journalist

Servando Ruiz Gómez

Servando Ruiz-Gómez y González-Llanos (27 February 1821 in Avilés, Spain – 19 August 1888 in Vigo, Spain) was a Spanish politician, lawyer and journalist who served as Minister of State from 1883 to 1884, in a liberal cabinet headed by José de Posada y Herrera.

Political offices
Preceded by The Marquis of la Vega de Armijo	Minister of State; 13 October 1883 – 18 January 1884	Succeeded by The Marquis of the Pazo de la Merced
