= Antonio Aguilar y Correa, Marquis of Vega de Armijo =

Spanish noble and politician

The Most Excellent Antonio Aguilar 8th Marquess of Vega de Armijo GE
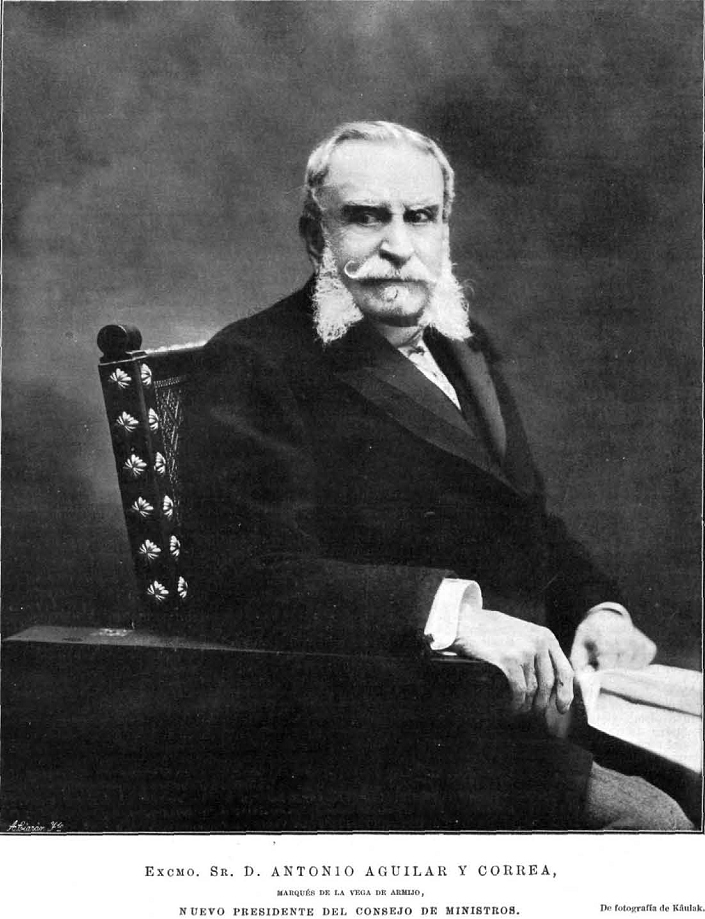

Prime Minister of Spain
- In office 4 December 1906 – 25 January 1907
- Monarch: Alfonso XIII
- Preceded by: Segismundo Moret
- Succeeded by: Antonio Maura

Personal details
- Born: Antonio Aguilar y Correa; 20 June 1824 Madrid, Spain
- Died: 13 June 1908 (aged 83)

Antonio Aguilar y Correa, 8th Marquess of la Vega de Armijo, 6th Marquess of Mos, Grandee of Spain (30 June 1824, in Madrid, Spain – 13 June 1908) was a Spanish noble and politician who served as Prime Minister of Spain between 1906 and 1907, and was appointed three times Minister of State, in governments headed by Práxedes Mateo Sagasta.

== Titles ==
- 8th Marquess of la Vega de Armijo
- 6th Marquess of Mos, Grandee of Spain
- 5th Count of Bobadilla
- 5th Viscount of Pegullal

== Ancestry ==
Ancestors of Antonio Aguilar y Correa, Marquis of Vega de Armijo

8. Juan Antonio de Aguilar y Mesía de La Cerda
4. José Aguilar y Narváez, 6th Marquess of la Vega de Armijo
9. Rosa de Narváez y Guzmán
2. Antonio Aguilar y Fernández de Córdoba, 7th Marquess of la Vega de Armijo
10. Cristóbal Fernández de Córdoba, 4th Marquess of Alganirejo
5. Leonor Fernández de Córdoba y Venegas de Córdoba
11. María Vicenta Venegas de Córdoba, 5th Countess of Luque
1. Antonio Aguilar y Correa, 8th Marquess of la Vega de Armijo
12. Pelayo Correa, 3rd Marquess of Mos
6. Benito Correa, 4th Marquess of Mos
13. Francisca de Yebra y Oca
3. Luisa Correa y Pinto de Sousa Coutinho
14. Luis Pinto de Sousa Coutinho, 1st Viscount of Balsemão
7. Maria Felicidade Pinto de Sousa Coutinho
15. Catharina Michaela de Sousa da Silva Alcoforado

Political offices
Preceded by The Marquess of the Pazo de la Merced	Minister of State; 8 February 1881 – 13 October 1883	Succeeded by Servando Ruiz-Gómez
Preceded by Segismundo Moret	Minister of State; 14 June 1888 – 5 July 1890	Succeeded by The Duke of Tetuan
Preceded by The Duke of Tetuan	Minister of State; 11 December 1892 – 5 April 1893	Succeeded by Segismundo Moret
