= José Bernardo de Tagle y Bracho, 1st Marquis of Torre Tagle =

Spanish noble

The Marquis of Torre Tagle
- Marquis of Torre Tagle
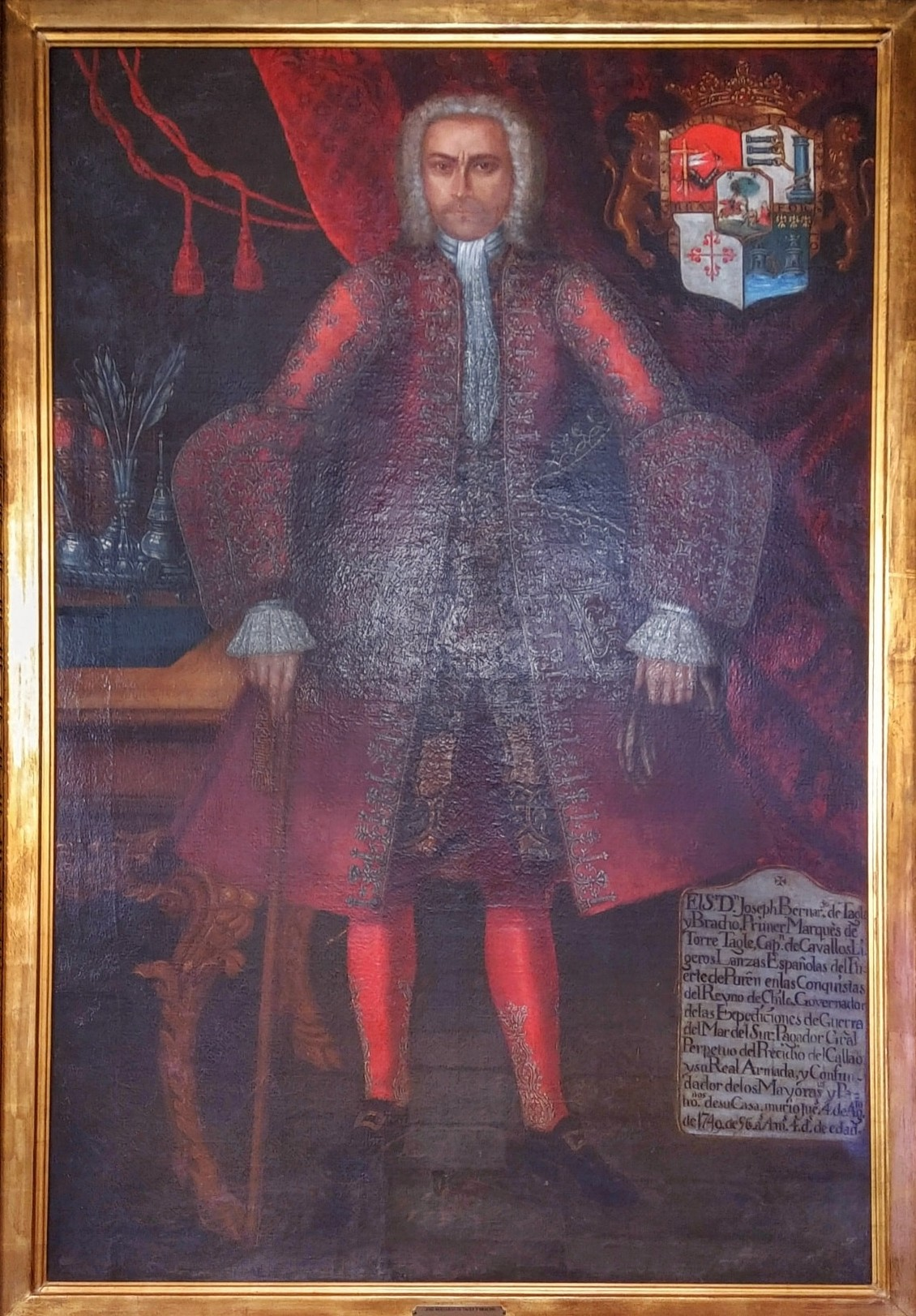
- Born: José Bernardo de Tagle-Bracho y Pérez de la Riva; 1644; Valle de Alfoz de Lloredo, Ruiloba, Cantabria, Spain
- Died: August 4, 1740
- Spouse: Rosa Juliana Sánchez de Tagle
- Issue: Tadeo José de Tagle-Bracho y Sánchez de Tagle (b. 1709); Serafina Agueda de Tagle-Bracho y Sánchez de Tagle (b. 1713); Francisco de Tagle-Bracho y Sánchez de Tagle (b. 1714 ) Pedro de Tagle-Bracho y Sánchez de Tagle(b. 1722)
- Parents: Domingo de Tagle y Bracho; Maria Pérez de la Riva

Don José Bernardo de Tagle-Bracho y Pérez de la Riva, 1st Marquis of Torre Tagle (1644 – August 4, 1740) was a Peruvian aristocrat who had high status in Spain and Peru in the 17th century.

José Tagle y Bracho was born in Valle de Alfoz de Lloredo, Ruiloba, Cantabria, Spain and is a member of the Tagle family; one of Spain's best and well known aristocratic families. He was baptised on April 9, 1644, at the Iglesia Parroquial del Valle de Alfoz de Lloredo in Santander, Spain. José Bernardo was the son of Don Domingo de Tagle y Bracho and Doña Maria Pérez de la Riva; both Spanish Hidalgos. He then married Doña Rosa Juliana Sánchez de Tagle; who was also a member of an important Cantabrian aristocratic family originated from Santillana del Mar, which apparently belonged to the Marquis of Altamira and shared a common ancestor with the Marquis of Torre Tagle. José Bernardo later rose to the position of Treasurer of the Spanish Royal Armada and on the 26th of November 1730, he was granted the title 1st Marquis of Torre Tagle by the grace of King Philip V of Spain. He then lived in Peru where he issued the building of his own residential palace, the Torre Tagle Palace. He was also the blood uncle of Don Juan Antonio de Tagle y Bracho; Count of Casa Tagle de Trasierra. The Marquis died on August 4, 1740, at the age of 96.
