= Juan Antonio de Tagle y Bracho, Count of Casa Tagle de Trasierra =

Spanish noble

The Most Illustrious The Count of Casa Tagle de Trasierra
- Count of Casa Tagle de Trasierra
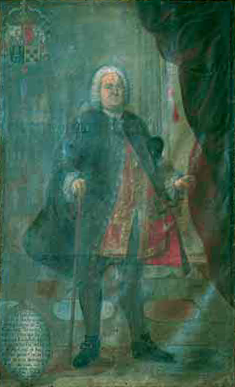
- Born: Juan Antonio de Tagle-Bracho y de la Pascua Calderón; 1685; Cigüenza, Spain
- Died: March 27, 1750; Lima, Peru
- Parents: Antonio de Tagle y Bracho; Marta de la Pascua Calderón

Don Juan Antonio de Tagle-Bracho y de la Pascua Calderón, Count of Casa Tagle de Trasierra (1685-March 27, 1750) was a Spanish/Peruvian aristocrat who alongside his uncle the Marquis of Torre Tagle, had high status in Spain and Peru in the 17th century.

Juan Antonio was born in Cigüenza (to less than 6 kilometers of Ruiloba) on 1685. He was the son of Don Antonio de Tagle y Bracho and Doña Marta de la Pascua Calderón. His father was the brother of Don José Bernardo de Tagle y Bracho, 1st Marquis of Torre Tagle and is a member of the Tagle Family.

On 1711, Juan Antonio immigrated to America. In Peru, he rec1ieved the title of Knight of the Order of Calatrava and was appointed Sergeant Major of the Police Militias of Lima. On 1745, Juan Antonio was granted the title of Count of Tagle by the grace of King Ferdinand VI of Spain due to his loyal service to the Spanish Crown.

One of his most commendable services to the crown was of Colonizing. Because the Count was in charge of the formation of new towns for the natives. Like his uncle, the Count made a large fortune while in Peru.

The Count died childless on March 27, 1750. His title was then passed down to his nephew, Nicolas de Tagle y Sanchez de Tagle.
