= Carlos O'Donnell, 2nd Duke of Tetuán =

Spanish noble and politician

Don Carlos Manuel O'Donnell y Álvarez de Abreu Grandee of Spain
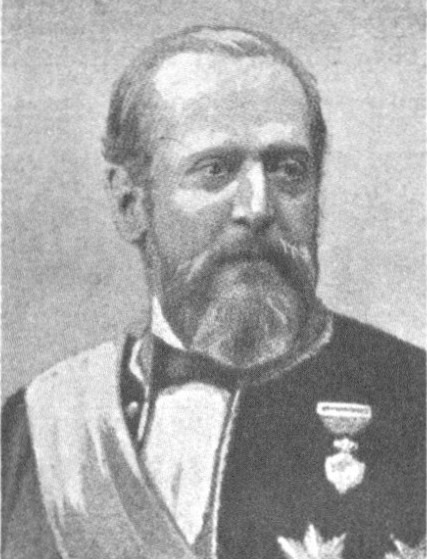

Ministry of Foreign Affairs
- In office 5 March 1896 – 4 October 1897
- In office 23 March 1895 – 19 January 1896
- In office 5 June 1890 – 11 December 1892
- In office 16 May 1879 – 7 December 1879

2nd Duke of Tetuán

2nd Count of Lucena

9th Marquis of Altamira

Personal details
- Born: 1 June 1834 Valencia, Spanish Empire
- Died: 9 February 1903 (aged 68) Madrid, Spanish Empire
- Citizenship: Spanish Empire
- Children: Don Juan O'Donnell
- Occupation: Politician

Don Carlos Manuel O'Donnell y Álvarez de Abreu, 2nd Duke of Tetuan Grandee of Spain, 9th Marquis of Altamira and 2nd Count of Lucena (1 June 1834, in Valencia – 9 February 1903, in Madrid) was a Spanish noble and politician who served four times as Minister of Foreign Affairs, the name which then received the Spanish Foreign Minister. He was also Mayordomo mayor to King Amadeo I.

== Biography ==
O'Donnell was born on 1 June 1834 in Valencia.

The Duke was the son of Carlos María O'Donnell y Joris, eldest brother of General Leopoldo O'Donnell, 1st Duke of Tetuan (several times Prime Minister of Spain), and Maria del Mar Álvarez de Abreu y Rodríguez de Albuerne, 8th Marquesa of Altamira and the granddaughter of Don Manuel Rodriguez de Albuerne y Pérez de Tagle, 5th Marquis of Altamira. In 1867 after his uncle's death, he inherited all his titles and fortune.

O'Donnell served as Minister of Foreign Affairs four times: between 16 May 1879 and 7 December 1879, 5 June 1890 to 11 December 1892, 23 March 1895 to 19 January 1896 and 5 March 1896 to 4 October 1897. During his tenure, he would attempt to push against the Monroe Doctrine in the face of the United States pressuring to grant autonomy for Spanish Cuba.

O'Donnell died on 9 February 1903.

== See also ==
- O'Donnell dynasty

Political offices
Preceded by The Marquis of Molíns	Minister of State; 16 May 1879 – 9 December 1879	Succeeded by The Count of Toreno
Preceded by The Marquis of la Vega de Armijo	Minister of State; 5 July 1890 – 11 December 1892	Succeeded by The Marquis of la Vega de Armijo
Preceded by Alejandro Groizard	Minister of State; 23 March 1895 – 19 January 1896	Succeeded by The Marquis of the Pazo de la Merced
Preceded by The Marquis of the Pazo de la Merced	Minister of State; 5 March 1896 – 4 October 1897	Succeeded by Pío Gullón
Spanish nobility
Preceded by Leopoldo O'Donnell	Duke of Tetuan; 5 November 1867 – 9 February 1903	Succeeded by Juan O'Donnell
Preceded by Leopoldo O'Donnell	Count of Lucena; 5 November 1867 – 9 February 1903	Succeeded by Juan O'Donnell
Preceded by Maria del Mar Alvarez de Abreu y Rodriguez de Albuerne	Marquis of Altamira ? – 9 February 1903	Succeeded by Juan O'Donnell
