= Manuel Rodriguez de Albuerne y Pérez de Tagle, 5th Marquis of Altamira =

Don Manuel Rodriguez de Albuerne y Pérez de Tagle, 5th Marquis of Altamira (1733–1791) was a Spanish-Mexican aristocrat. He was a member of the House of Tagle, one of Spain and Mexico's most important and influential noble families during the 16th to the 19th century.

== Early life ==
He was born on 5 April 1733, in Guadalajara, New Spain and was baptized on 12 April 1733. Don Manuel was the son of Don Juan Rodríguez de Albuerne and Doña Luisa Pérez de Tagle, 4th Marchioness of Altamira.

Don Manuel inherited the Hacienda Cuisillos after a period of administration by his brother-in-law and legal guardian Domingo Trespalacios Escandón, a judge in the Audiencia of Mexico and a member of the Council of Indies.

== Family ==
He married Doña María de la Paz Girón Moctezuma, a direct descendant of Emperor Moctezuma II, and a member of the family of the Duke of Moctezuma de Tultengo on April 21, 1771, in Madrid, Spain.

Together they had three children:

- Doña María de la Paz Rodríguez Albuerne y Girón who married her second cousin José María Trespalacios Rodríguez de Albuerne, son of Domingo Trespalacios Escandón and Cecilia Rodríguez de Albuerne y Pérez de Tagle
- Doña Luisa Rodríguez Albuerne y Girón who married Manuel José Álvarez de Abreú
- Don Manuel Rodríguez Albuerne y Girón

Don Manuel and his wife were also the fourth cousins of Empress Ana Maria of Mexico as Don Manuel's and Empress Ana Maria's great great great grandfathers, Don Luis Sánchez de Tagle, 1st Marquis of Altamira and Don Pedro Sánchez de Tagle were brothers.

He is also the great-grandfather of Carlos O'Donnell, 2nd Duke of Tetuan and Grandee of Spain through his daughter Doña Luisa.

The title of Marquis of Altamira has since been passed on to the descendants of his great-grandson. The current holder of the title is Don Carlos O'Donnell, 15th Marquis of Altamira and Grandee of Spain
