= Count of Lucena =

Comital Crown (Spanish Heraldry)

Count of Lucena (Condado de Lucena) is a Spanish hereditary comital title conferred on General Leopoldo O'Donnell y Joris by Queen Isabella II of Spain, on 25 July 1847. It was granted to him after defeating carlist General Ramón Cabrera in Lucena del Cid in the province of Valencia, as a victory title.

As General O'Donnell was created in 1860 Duke of Tetuan, the title Count of Lucena has been held since then by several Dukes of Tetuan. The 3rd Duke ceded this title to his elder daughter Blanca, but as her elder brother, the 4th Duke, died shortly after her father, the two titles were joined again. The 7th Duke ceded the title to his fourth and youngest son in the expectation that the two titles will definitely be disjoined in the future.

== Counts of Lucena (1847-) ==
- Leopoldo O'Donnell, 1st Duke of Tetuan and 1st Count of Lucena (1809–1867)
- Carlos O'Donnell, 2nd Duke of Tetuan and 2nd Count of Lucena (1834–1903), son of the 1st Dukes's eldest brother
- Juan O'Donnell, 3rd Duke of Tetuan and 3rd Count of Lucena (1864–1928), eldest son of the 2nd Duke
- Blanca O'Donnell, 5th Duchess of Tetuan and 4th Countess of Lucena (1898–1952), elder daughter of the 3rd Duke
- Leopoldo O'Donnell, 6th Duke of Tetuan and 5th Count of Lucena (1874–2004), eldest son of the 2nd Duke's third son
- Hugo O'Donnell, 7th Duke of Tetuan and 6th Count of Lucena (born 1948), eldest son of the 6th Duke
- Alfonso O'Donnell, 7th Count of Lucena (born 1984), youngest son of the 7th Duke

The heir presumptive is Carlos O'Donnell, Marquis of Altamira (born 1974).
