= Juan O'Donnell =

The Most Excellent The Duke of Tetuán GE
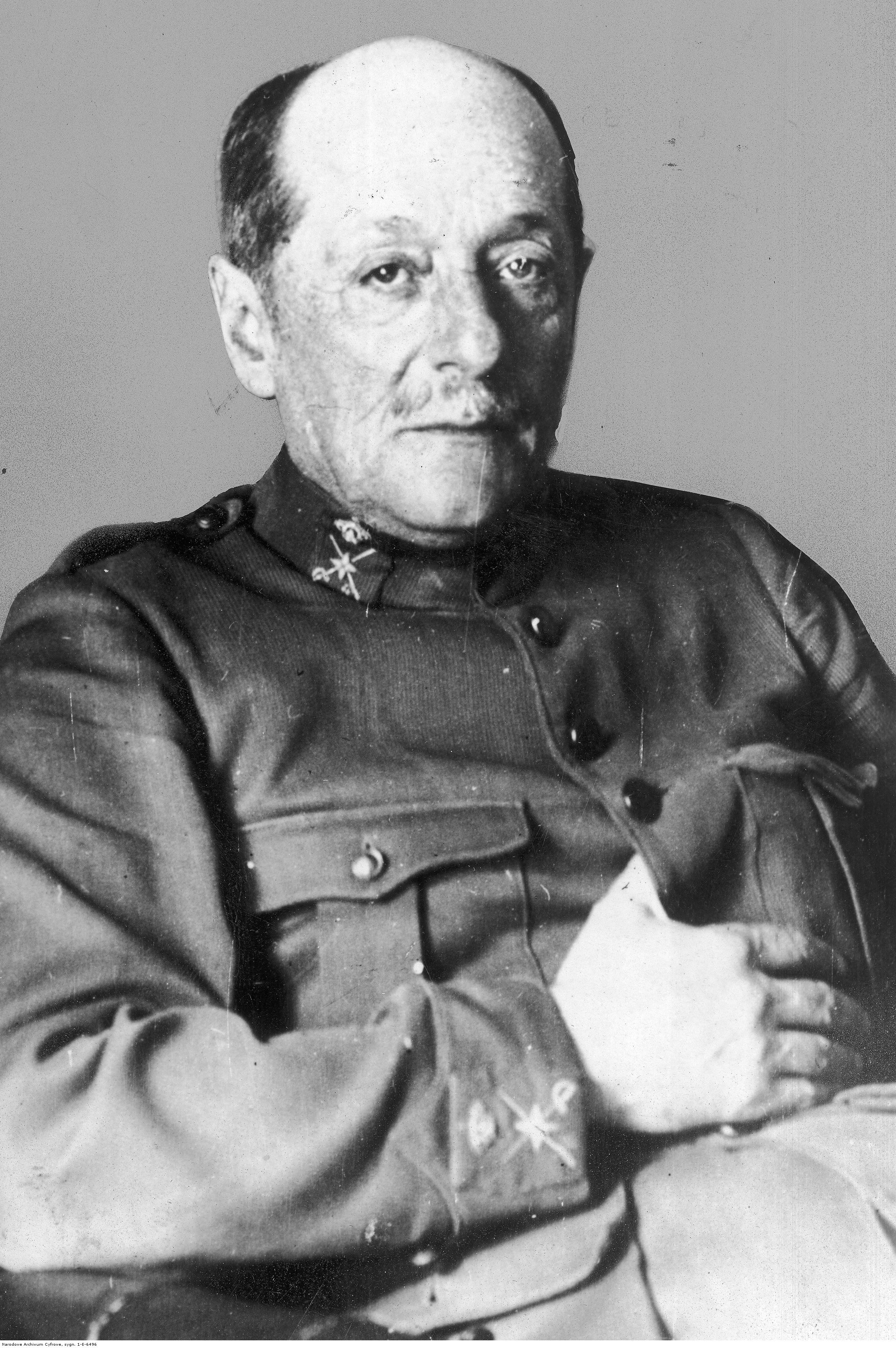

3rd Duke of Tetuán
- In office 9 February 1903 – 12 October 1928
- Preceded by: Carlos O'Donnell
- Succeeded by: Juan O'Donnell y Díaz de Mendoza

3rd Count of Lucena
- In office 9 February 1903 – 12 October 1928
- Preceded by: Carlos O'Donnell
- Succeeded by: Blanca O'Donnell y Díaz de Mendoza

Minister of War of Spain
- In office 4 July 1924 – 12 October 1928
- Monarch: Alfonso XIII
- Prime Minister: Miguel Primo de Rivera
- Preceded by: Luis Bermúdez de Castro
- Succeeded by: Severiano Martínez Anido (as interim); Julio Ardanaz (as Minister of the Army)

Personal details
- Born: Juan O'Donnell y Vargas; 15 July 1864 Madrid, Spanish Empire
- Died: 12 October 1928 (aged 82)
- Spouse: Dona Maria Diaz de Mendoza y Aguado
- Parent: Don Carlos Manuel O'Donnell y Álvarez de Abreu

Military service
- Allegiance: Spanish Empire
- Rank: Colonel

Juan O'Donnell y Vargas, 3rd Duke of Tetuán (15 July 1864 – 12 October 1928) was an influential Spanish politician.

== Biography ==
O'Donnell was born in Madrid on 15 July 1864 and ascended to become the 3rd Duke of Tetuan, Grandee of Spain, 3rd Conde de Lucena, Cavalry Colonel, and the Director of the School of Military Riding. In 1896, he married Doña Maria Diaz de Mendoza y Aguado, hailing from the noble house of Lalain and Balazote, Marquises of Fontanar. He was the son of Carlos O'Donnell y Abréu, 2nd Duke of Tetuan. He served as Minister for War under Miguel Primo de Rivera from 1924 to 1928 until his death in office.

In 1895, while serving as a lieutenant on the staff of general Martinez Campos, O'Donnell accompanied Winston Churchill and Reginald Barnes during their military visit to Cuba. In his memoirs, Churchill commented on Juan O'Donnell's excellent spoken English.

In January 1922, O'Donnell served as the president of the "World Congress of the Irish Race" in Paris. This gathering brought together members of the global Irish diaspora to discuss strategies for supporting the economic development of an independent Ireland and its reconstruction in the aftermath of the Civil War.

== See also ==
- Duke of Tetuán
- O'Donnell dynasty

Spanish nobility
| Preceded by Carlos O'Donnell | Duke of Tetuan; 9 February 1903 – 12 October 1928 | Succeeded by Juan O'Donnell |
| Preceded by Carlos O'Donnell | Count of Lucena; 9 February 1903 – 12 October 1928 | Succeeded by Blanca O'Donnell |
