= Hugo O'Donnell, 7th Duke of Tetuan =

Grandee of Spain

The Most Excellent Hugo O'Donnell GE KM FRHistS
- The Duke of Tetuán
- The future Duke of Tetuán (left) as a teenager in 1963 with Commandant Patrick Denis O'Donnell, an officer in the Irish Army

- Coat of arms
- Tenure: 2005-present
- Predecessor: Leopoldo O'Donnell y Lara, 6th Duke of Tetuán
- Heir apparent: Carlos O'Donnell y Armada, 15th Marquess of Altamira
- Born: Hugo José O'Donnell y Duque de Estrada; 29 September 1948 (age 78); Madrid, Spain
- Noble family: O'Donnell
- Spouse: María de la Asunción Armada y Díez de Rivera
- Issue: Carlos Leopoldo O'Donnell y Armada, 15th Marquess of Altamira; María de la Fuencisla O'Donnell y Armada; Hugo José O'Donnell y Armada, 9th Marquess of Las Salinas; Alfonso O'Donnell y Armada, 7th Count of Lucena
- Father: Leopoldo O'Donnell y Lara, 6th Duke of Tetuán
- Mother: Consuelo Duque de Estrada y Moreno de la Serna
- Occupation: Military officer, historian, lawyer

Hugo José O'Donnell y Duque de Estrada, 7th Duke of Tetuán, GE, KM, FRHistS (born 29 September 1948), is a Spanish peer, naval officer, lawyer and historian who was the vice president of the International Commission for Maritime History, censor of the Royal Academy of History, and elected member of the Royal Historical Society.

== Life ==
He succeeded his father, Leopoldo O'Donnell y Lara, as Duke of Tetuán with all its titles and honours on 5 October 2005. The title commemorates the conquest of Tetuán in Morocco in the mid-19th century by his ancestor, General Leopoldo O'Donnell, who served as Prime Minister of Spain on several occasions and who was later created, in 1860, the 1st Duke of Tetuán.

He was the recognised Tánaiste (heir apparent) to The O'Donnell of Tyrconnell, Chief of the Name of the O'Donnells, who was a retired Franciscan priest, Fr. Hugh O'Donel, deceased on 11 July 2023, and whom he succeeded as Chief of the Name, according to the opinions of authors Curley and Ellis referenced below, even though Fr. O'Donel was never formally inaugurated as Chief due to having taken religious vows. Furthermore, following the advice of the Attorney General, in 2003 the Genealogical Office discontinued the practice of recognising Chiefs of the Name.

The duke is an active member of the Clan Association of O'Donnell of Tyrconnell (of Ireland), and he is a Knight of Malta. The duke is a naval historian, and also a former naval commander and Minister for the Marine in Spain.

He was elected to Medalla nº 2 of the Royal Academy of History on 22 June 2001, and he took up his seat on 1 February 2004.

== Marriage and issue ==
The duke is married to María de la Asunción Armada y Díez de Rivera. Together, they had four children:

1. Carlos Leopoldo O'Donnell y Armada, 15th Marquess of Altamira and Grandee of Spain (born 1974)
2. Maria de la Fuencisla O'Donnell y Armada (born 1975)
3. Hugo José O'Donnell y Armada, 9th Marquess of las Salinas (born 1979)
4. Alfonso O'Donnelly Armada, 7th Count of Lucena (born 1984)

== Titles, styles, honours and arms ==
=== Titles and styles ===
- 19 September 2005- 10 May 2006: The Most Excellent Hugo José O'Donnell y Duque de Estrada, 7th Duke of Tetuán, 14th Marquess of Altamira, 8th Marquess of Las Salinas, and 6th Count of Lucena.
- 10 May 2006 – present: The Most Excellent Hugo José O'Donnell y Duque de Estrada, 7th Duke of Tetuán.

=== Military ranks ===
- Commandant, Marine Infantry

=== Honours and decorations ===
==== Military ====
- Spain
  - Grand Cross of Naval Merit with White Decoration
  - Medal of the Sahara

==== Chivalric ====
- Sovereign Military Order of Malta
  - Knight Grand Cross of Honour and Devotion.

==== Scholastic ====
- Spain
  - Numerary Member and Censor of the Royal Academy of History.
  - Meritorious Academic of the Royal Madrilenian Academy of Heraldry and Genealogy.
- United Kingdom
  - Elected Fellow of the Royal Historical Society.

== See also ==
- Spanish nobility

== Bibliography ==
- Curley, Walter J. P., with foreword by Charles Lysaght (2004). Vanishing Kingdoms. The Irish Chiefs and Their Families. Dublin: Lilliput Press; chapter on O'Donnell of Tyrconnell, p. 59. ISBN 1-84351-055-3 & ISBN 1-84351-056-1
- Ellis, Peter Berresford (1999). Erin's Blood Royal. The Gaelic Noble Dynasties of Ireland. London: Constable; pages 251–258 on the O'Donel, Prince of Tirconnell
- O’Donnell, Francis Martin (2018), The O’Donnells of Tyrconnell – A Hidden Legacy, Washington, D.C.: Academica Press LLC, ISBN 978-1-680534740

Spanish nobility
Preceded by Leopoldo O'Donnell	Duke of Tetuan; 13 July 2005 – present	Incumbent; Heir: Carlos O'Donnell
Preceded by Leopoldo O'Donnell	Marquess of Altamira	Succeeded by Carlos O'Donnell
