= Duke of Tetuán =

Spanish hereditary title

Dukedom of Tetúan
- Creation date: 27 April 1860
- Created by: Queen Isabella II
- Peerage: Peerage of Spain
- First holder: Leopoldo O'Donnell y Jorís, 1st Duke of Tetuán
- Present holder: Hugo O'Donnell y Duque de Estrada, 7th Duke of Tetuán
- Heir apparent: Carlos O'Donnell y Armada, 15th Marquess of Altamira
- Subsidiary titles: Count of Lucena; Marquess of Altamira; Marquess of Las Salinas

Duke of Tetuán (Spanish: Duque de Tetuán) is a hereditary title in the Peerage of Spain, with the dignity of Grandee and granted in 1860 by Queen Isabella II to General Leopoldo O'Donnell, 1st Count of Lucena, who had served as the Prime Minister of Spain for several legislatures between 1856 and 1866.

It is a victory title, and was granted to O'Donnell for his victory at the Battle of Tétouan during the First Moroccan War.

It has been held since its creation by members of the O'Donnell family, as the 5th Duchess, Blanca O'Donnell, died without issue of her marriage to Guillermo Pelizaeus.

== Dukes of Tetuan (1860-) ==
- Leopoldo O'Donnell y Jorís, 1st Duke of Tetúan (1809–1867)
- Carlos Manuel O'Donnell y Álvarez de Abreu, 2nd Duke of Tetuán (1834–1903), son of the 1st duke's eldest brother
- Juan O'Donnell y Vargas, 3rd Duke of Tetuán (1864–1928), eldest son of the 2nd duke
- Juan O'Donnell y Díaz de Mendoza, 4th Duke of Tetuán (1897–1934), eldest son of the 3rd duke
- Blanca O'Donnell y Díaz de Mendoza, 5th Duchess of Tetuán (1898–1952), elder daughter of the 3rd duke
- Leopoldo O'Donnell y Lara, 6th Duke of Tetuán (1915–2004), eldest son of the 2nd duke's third son
- Hugo O'Donnell y Duque de Estrada, 7th Duke of Tetuán (b. 1948), eldest son of the 6th duke

The heir apparent is Carlos O'Donnell y Armada, 15th Marquess of Altamira (b. 1974).

== See also ==
- List of dukes in the peerage of Spain
- List of current grandees of Spain
