= Teagle =

Teagle may refer to:

- Terry Michael Teagle (born 1960), American professional basketball player
- Walter Clark Teagle (1878–1962), American president of Standard Oil of New Jersey
- Teagle, California
- Block and tackle
