= Palacio de Torre Tagle =

Cultural heritage site in Lima, Peru

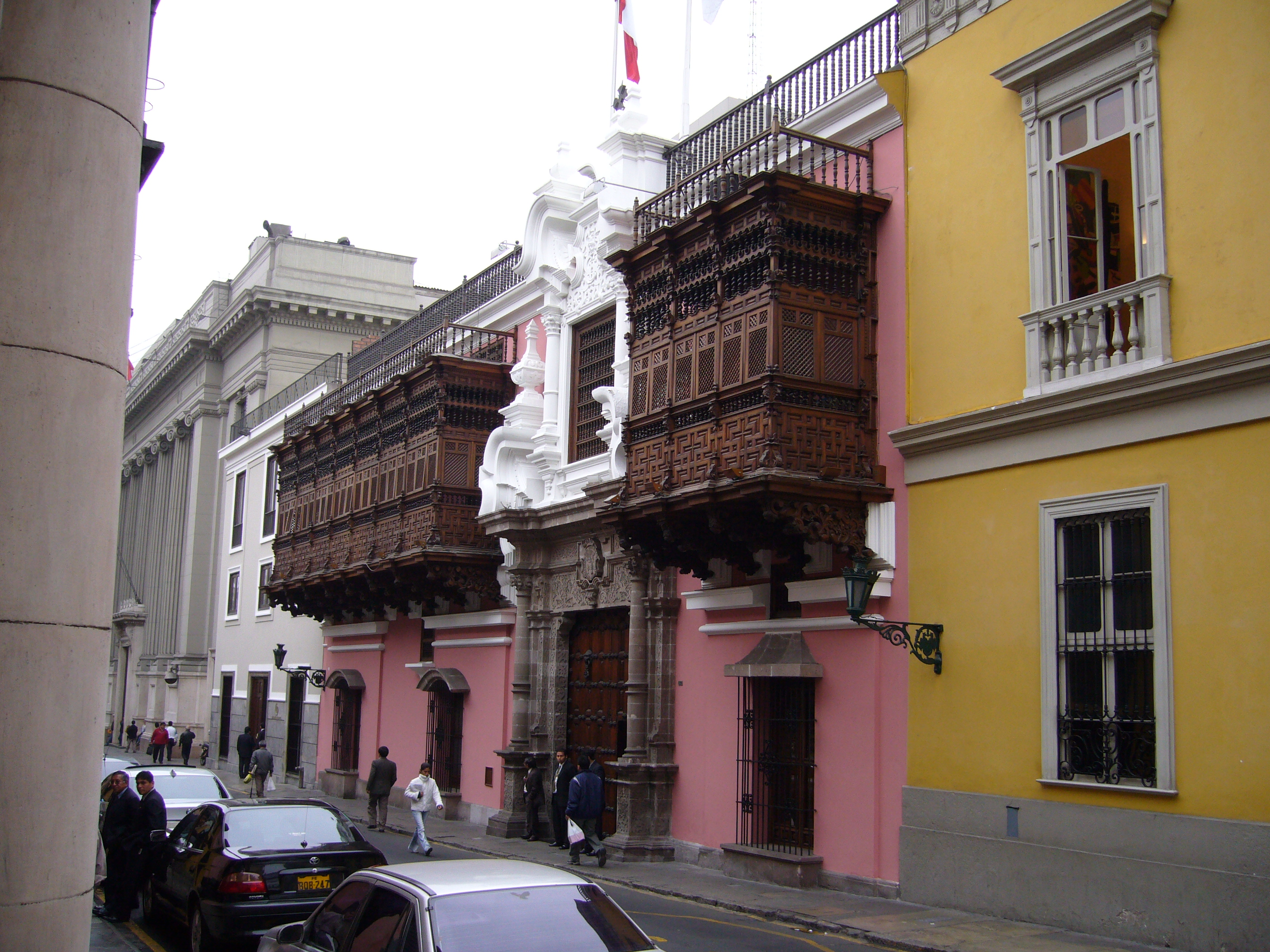
- The building exterior in 2007

General information
- Status: Completed
- Type: Mansion
- Architectural style: Andalusian Baroque; Mudéjar; Churrigueresque
- Location: Jirón Ucayali, Lima, Peru
- Coordinates: 12°02′56″S 77°01′46″W
- Current tenants: Ministry of Foreign Affairs
- Completed: 1735
- Renovated: 1956
- Owner: Government of Peru (since 1918)

Technical details
- Grounds: 1,699 m^{2} (18,290 sq ft)

Design and construction
- Architect: José Bernardo de Tagle Bracho

Renovating team
- Architect: Andrés Boyer

The Palacio de Torre Tagle is a residential mansion built during the colonial era of Peru that currently houses offices of the Ministry of Foreign Affairs of Peru. It is located in the Jirón Ucayali in the historic centre of Lima, two blocks southeast of the Plaza Mayor.

It comprises a built area of 1,699 m^{2} (18,290 sq ft). The materials used in the construction of the Palacio de Torre Tagle were brought from Spain, Panama and other Central American countries.

== History ==
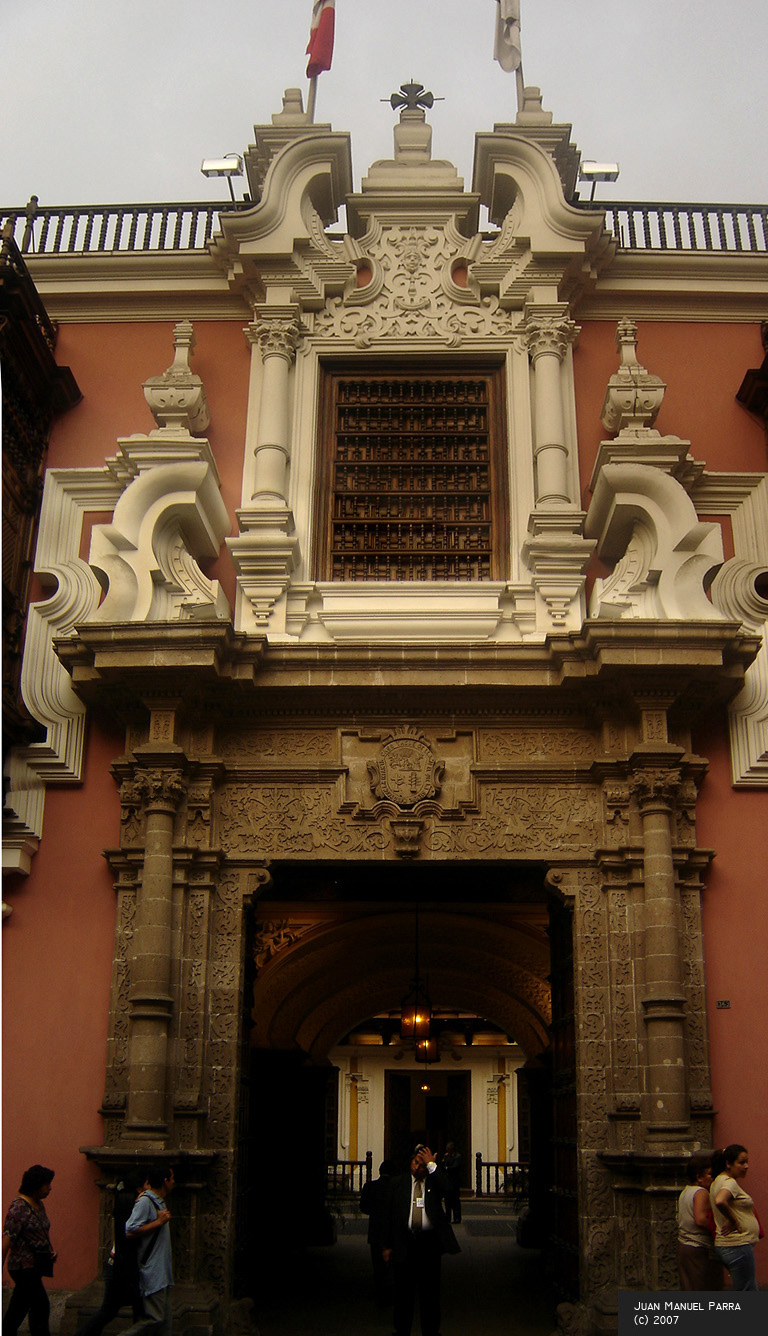
Carved stone porticoes of the Palacio de Torre Tagle at the top of which the noble coat of arms of the Torre Tagle family stands out.

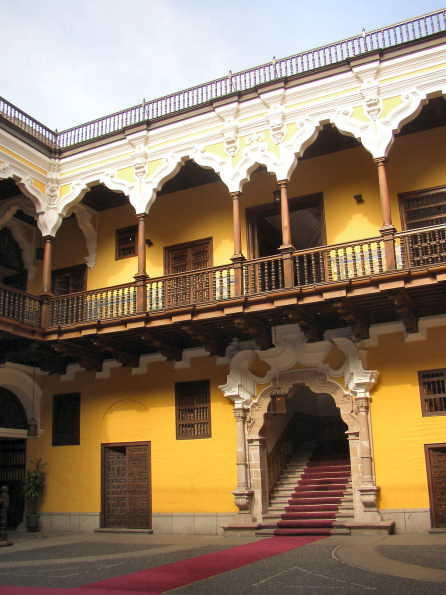
Courtyard of the Palacio de Torre Tagle, Sevillian Churrigueresque and Mudéjar.

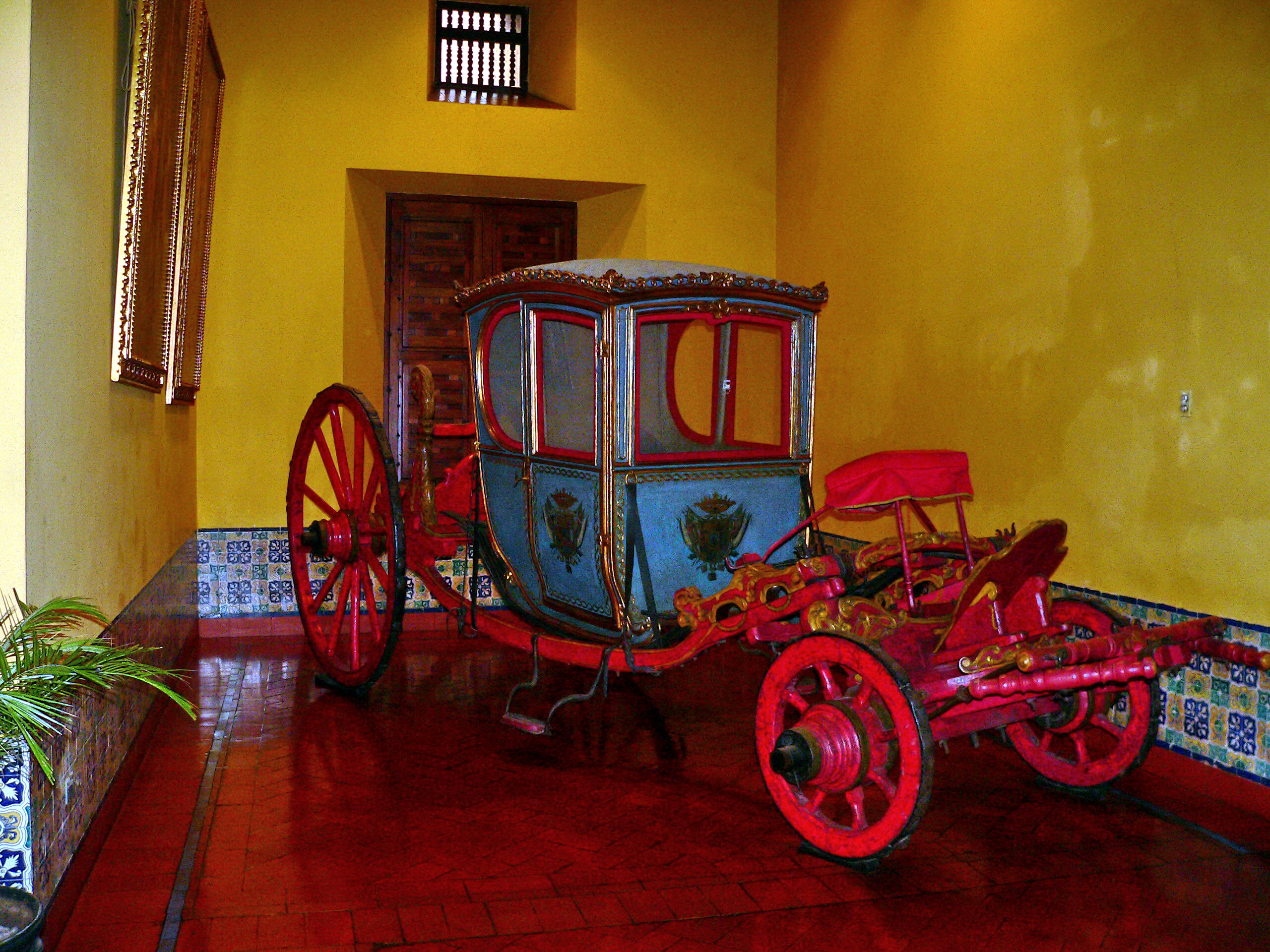
Blue and red carriage from the 18th century of the Marquis of Torre Tagle.

The mansion was built at the early-18th century and was completed in 1735 for José Bernardo de Tagle Bracho who, on November 26, 1730, King Philip V of Spain, by virtue of his extensive services to the Crown, granted the title of Marquis of Torre Tagle, thus making him the founder of that marquessate.

The Peruvian State acquired the colonial building on June 27, 1918, for the sum of S/. 320,000 to the heirs of Ricardo Ortiz de Zevallos y Tagle, 4th Marquis of Torre Tagle. It was restored in 1956 by the Spanish architect Andrés Boyer, and it was, since 1918 to 2023, the main headquarters of the Ministry of Foreign Affairs of Peru, actually houses the National Directorate of State Ceremonial and Protocol.

== Description ==
=== Façade ===
The façade of the Palacio de Torre Tagle, is of Andalusian Baroque style and displays carved stone porticos, arches, two artistic Mudéjar wooden balconies, and wood carvings of cedar and mahogany. Regarding the architectural style of this house, the architect Héctor Velarde Bergmann specifies:

"The Palacio de Torre-Tagle is a symbol of Lima and is unrivaled for its style, grace and richness. It does not look like anything in its so Liman unit. Its luxurious elegance gracefully departs from the ornate, and its ample proportions are never lost in emptiness. Its aesthetic quality is perfect as its expression of time and place."

— Héctor Velarde Bergmann

"The Andalusian, Criollo and even Asian contributions are harmonized with incomparable charm."

— Héctor Velarde Bergmann

The exterior part presents a remarkable and asymmetrical façade, a characteristic that gives it agility and harmony, with a carved portal, in stone in the first body and in stucco in the second, in the most charming Liman Baroque. The upper part of the portal incorporates the noble coat of arms of the Torre Tagle family in which the legend reads:

"Tagle se llamó el que la sierpe mató y con la infanta casó."

means:

"Tagle was called the one that killed the snake and got married with the infanta."

On its second floor, the facade features two typical but ornate balconies, which were the most beautiful from the colonial period. These balconies are made of carved cedar and mahogany wood carved in a Mudéjar-reminiscent style, highlighting the asymmetry of the façade. The enclosed balcony on the right has three sections while the one on the left has seven. Both are completely closed with blinds with slats, both balconies, which reflect the transition from the Andalusian Mudéjar style to the Hispanic-American Baroque. Supporting the balcony are carved wood corbels, with Hindu-inspired motifs.

The windows in the lower part of the house are simple and with wrought iron bars whose austerity contrasts with the ornate style of the balconies. The impressive-sized wooden door, decorated with bronze nails and adorned with two full-size door knockers, opens into a zaguan, featuring four stone-carved segmental arches with a stone floor, in the zaguan to the right and left, there are small steps used by the ladies to get on their mounts without difficulty.

On the platforms that crown them, you can see that the stone pieces are joined by copper stars. Near this place a chain was placed that signified the right of Asylum, a privilege that the Palace of the Marquises of Torre Tagle had, and which some churches in Lima also enjoyed at that time. The walls of the zaguan are decorated with Sevillian azulejos and the ceiling is remarkably artesonado.

=== Interior ===
The zaguan leads to a first courtyard, with a spacious entrance, wide, bright and surrounded by elegant balustrades, arcades and Mudéjar-style columns, conceived as the vital center of the entire architectural complex that gravitates towards it. The style is mainly Andalusian Baroque with an obvious Mudéjar influence on the two floors surrounding the central courtyard. The upper floor is reached by a spacious and opulent staircase at the entrance of which is a notable stone doorway with trefoil arches that, like those on the upper floor, exhibit Andalusian Mudéjar influence.

On the ceiling of the staircase of the Palacio de Torre Tagle, the coat of arms of the Marquis can be seen, made up of three quarters in which a knight, a snake and a maiden can be distinguished, symbolizing the nickname: Tagle was called the one that the snake killed and with the infanta killed. The upper floor of this family home features elegant galleries with azulejos baseboards, guardrail with balusters and fine mosaic floors.

It has fourteen rooms, a dining room, a kitchen, a small chapel, with a fire-gilded Baroque altar, adorned with mirrors and elegant halls, the decorative and interesting azulejos (dating from 1735). One of the rooms, called the Salón Principal, shows the portraits of the Torre Tagle family, one of them shows Don José Bernardo de Tagle Bracho, the 1st Marquis of Torre Tagle who became, in conclusion, the architect of the palace, according to the inscription on the painting:

"Mr. José Bernardo de Tagle y Bracho, 1st Marquis of Torre-Tagle, captain of Light horses, Spanish lances from the fort of Purén, in the conquests of the kingdom of Chile. Governor of the South Sea war expeditions. Perpetual General Paymaster of the Presidio of Callao and its royal army, and founder of the mayorazgos and patronages of his House".

Another of the paintings shows his wife (she died in 1761). One of the palace's greatest attractions is its 18th-century blue and red carriage, which was used by the Marquis of Torre Tagle. The second courtyard was used for the stables, services and garages, with carriages of the time.

== Gallery ==
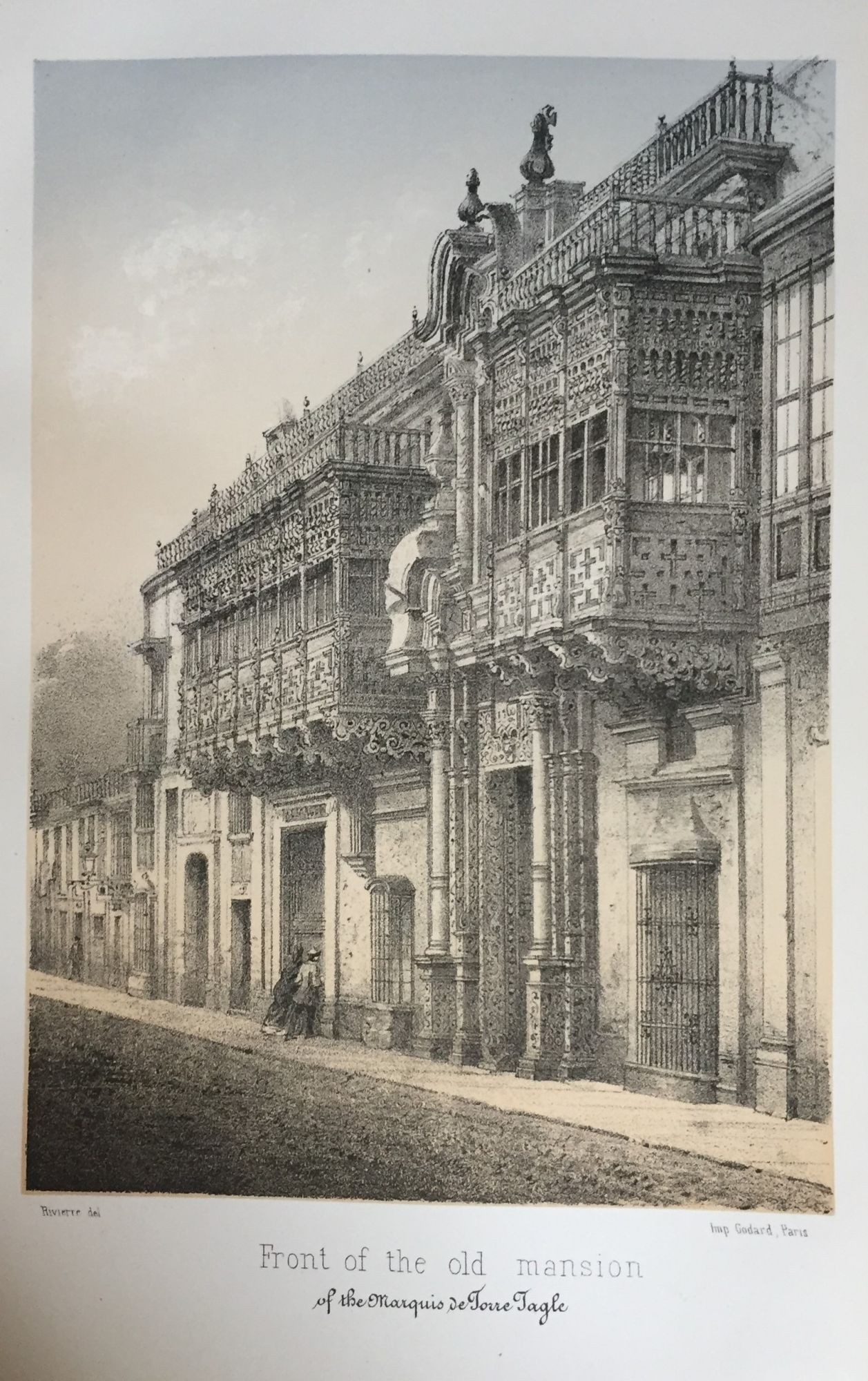
Palacio de Torre Tagle in 1866. (Lima or Sketches of the Capital of Peru by Manuel A. Fuentes and Firmin Didot, Brothers, Sons & Co.). University of Chicago Library.

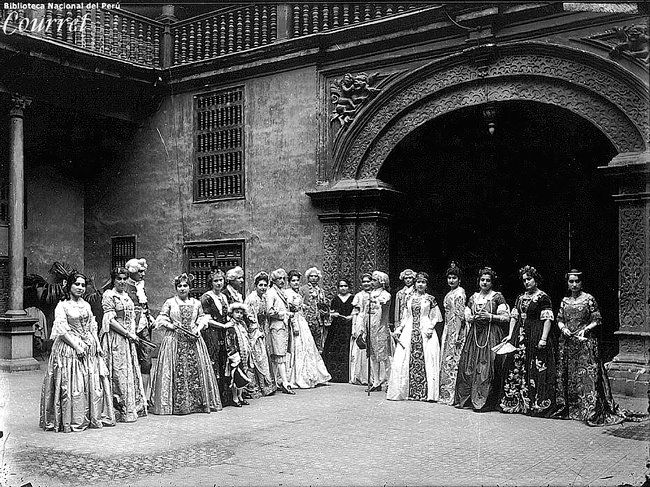
Festivities of the Centennial of the Independence of Peru inside the Palacio de Torre Tagle, photo of 1921.

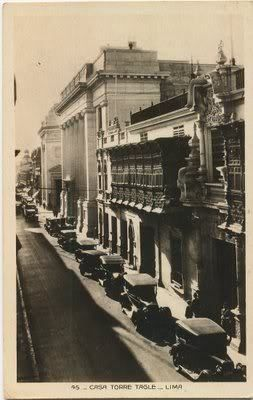
Palacio de Torre Tagle in 1930.

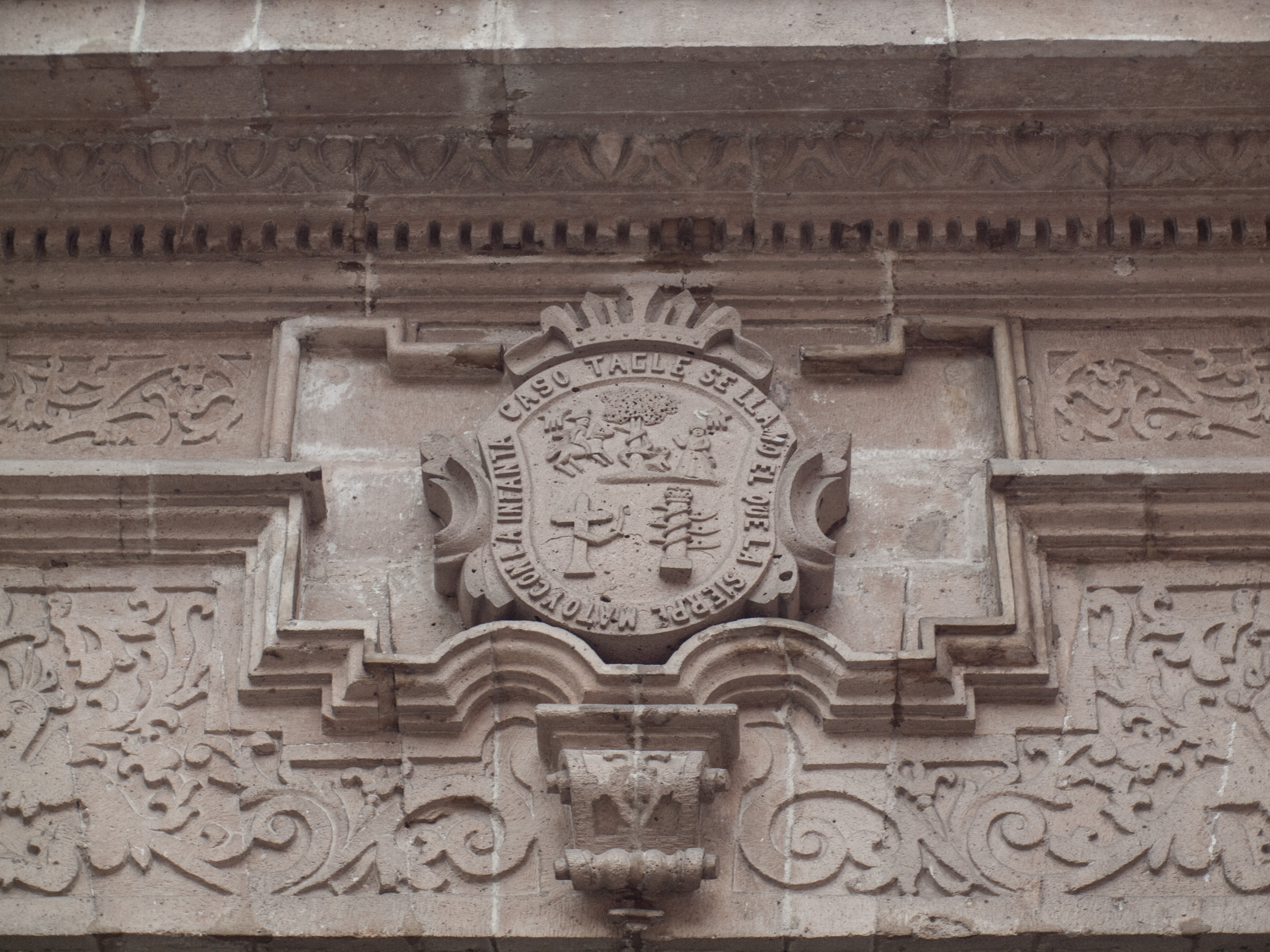
"Tagle se llamó el que la sierpe mató y con la infanta casó."

== See also ==
- Architecture of Peru
- Balconies of Lima
