= Manuela Sánchez de Tagle, 3rd Marchioness of Altamira =

Doña Manuela Sánchez de Tagle y Sánchez de Tagle, 3rd Marchioness of Altamira was a Spanish-Mexican aristocrat.

== Early life ==
Doña Manuela was the daughter of Don Pedro Sánchez de Tagle, 2nd Marquis of Altamira and Doña Luisa Sánchez de Tagle, daughter of Don Luis Sánchez de Tagle, 1st Marquis of Altamira. Her parent were first cousins.

== Family ==
Doña Manuela married on April 12, 1714, Don Pedro Pérez de Tagle, a member of the House of Tagle. Together they had a daughter, Doña Luisa Pérez de Tagle y Sánchez de Tagle. She succeeded her father Don Pedro and became the 3rd marquesa of Altamira. The marquesa and her husband continued on the family business and enriched the Hacienda Cuisillos, which was the prime distributor of tequila in New Spain.

She was succeeded by her only daughter Doña Luisa Pérez de Tagle, who became the 4th marquesa of Altamira
