= Luis Sánchez de Tagle, 1st Marquis of Altamira =

Spanish aristocrat (1642–1710)

The Most Illustrious The Marquess of Altamira
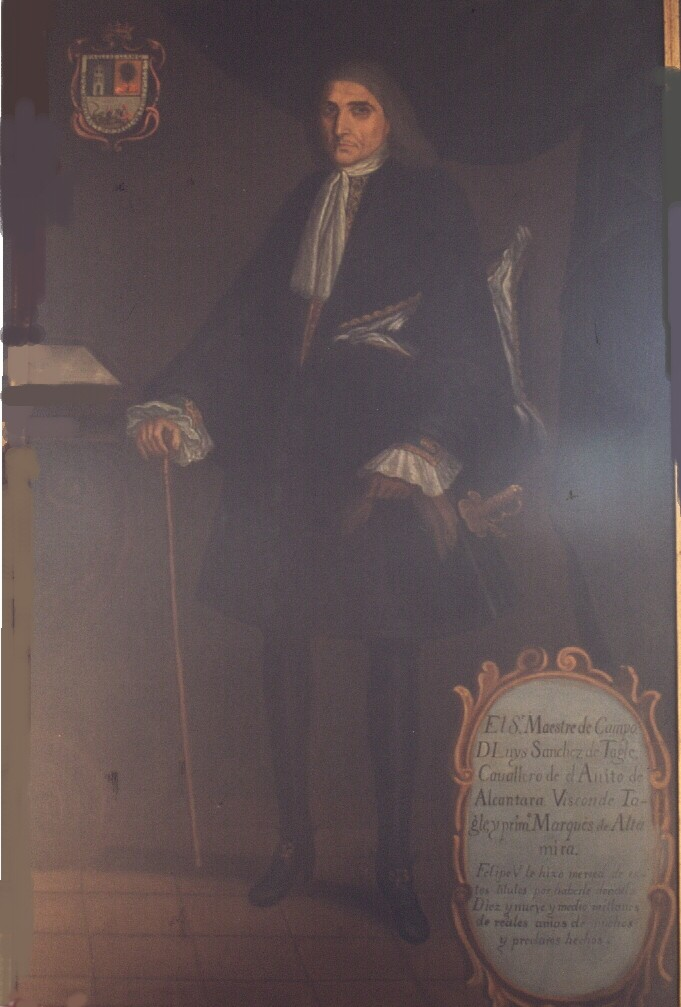
- Luis Sánchez de Tagle, Marquis of Altamira
- Born: 1642
- Died: 1710 (aged 67–68)
- Spouse: Damiana de Dávila y Rojas
- Children: Luisa Sánchez de Tagle
- Parent(s): Anselmo Sánchez de Tagle; Juliana de la Rasa Barreda

Don Luis Sánchez de Tagle y de la Rasa, 1st Marquis of Altamira (1642 - 1710) was a Spanish aristocrat who gained great wealth and influence in New Spain during the 17th century.

== Early life ==
Don Luis was born on 1642 in Santillana, Spain. He was the son of Don Anselmo Sánchez de Tagle and his second wife, Doña Juliana de la Rasa Barreda. Through his father, he was a member of the House of Tagle, one of Spain's most important noble families whose origins can be traced back during the 6th century in the Kingdom of Asturias. At a very young age he left Spain and migrated to New Spain, now Mexico, amassed great power and influence.

== Life in New Spain ==
Don Luis became the most successful and richest man in New Spain by the end of the 17th century. He had many businesses in the commercial market and held the greatest influence as the financier and buyer of the silver mines. as well as investing in large haciendas in northern Mexico. He wielded the greatest influence in the realm as well as outside it as branch members of his family also held great influence in other Spanish colonies such as Peru, Guatemala, Chile leading all the way to the Philippines (the Tagle family AND the Pérez de Tagle family whose descendants include Don Carlos Preysler Pérez de Tagle of the Banco Español-Filipino and his daughter Isabel Preysler), where Manila was one of the greatest commercial hubs of the Spanish Empire.

So great was his wealth that he was able to lend the Spanish Crown 850,000 silver pesos from 1683 to 1698. Between 1700 and 1703, Don Luis was able to lend 500,000 pesos de oro común to the dynasty of Spain's new king, Philip V, the first Spanish king from the House of Bourbon. In gratitude for his loyalty to the Spanish crown, King Philip V granted him the title of 1st Marquis of Altamira, reflecting his good standing in this new dynasty.

The Marquis of Altamira, together with the Marquis of Santa Sabina and the Marquis of Santa Fe, composed the triumvirate which represented the Consulado of Seville and together they defended the interests of the Spanish fleet merchants in New Spain.

The House of Tagle led by the Marquis of Altamira also involved itself in the Philippines. A branch of the family migrated to the colony and ensured the family's influence over the country. Also, with the family ties to the colony, they managed to create a strong relationship with Fausto Cruzat, who served as the Governor General to the Philippines beginning in 1688. This relationship resulted in the engagement of Cruzat's daughtern Doña Ignacia, to Don Domingo Ruiz de Tagle, Marquis of Sierra Nevada who was the nephew of Don Luis. Don Domingo Ruiz de Tagle stayed in the Philippines starting 1708 and served as the General of the Manila-Acapulco Galleon Trade.

== Conflict with the Duke of Alburquerque ==
On November 27, 1702, Don Francisco Fernández de la Cueva, 10th Duke of Alburquerque was assigned by the Spanish crown as the new viceroy of New Spain. The rival merchants of Don Luis forged an alliance with the Duke, who in turn received bribes and even mounted his own business schemes to market illegal merchandise. Soon enough the Duke of Alburquerque clashed with the Marquis of Altamira; in 1703 the Duke accused the Don Luis' nephew the Marquis of Sierra Nevada of breaching the trade restrictions of the Manila-Acapulco Galleon Trade. The Duke also derail the marriage of Don Domingo to Ignacia Cruzat, and supported Jose Joaquin de Uribe, the new oidor or judge as he is one of the Duke's favorite in the high court. On February 6, 1703, the Duke of Alburquerque imprisoned the Marquis of Sierra Nevada for his so-called violations.

Even though the two families are in a feud, the Duke's wife, Doña Juana de la Cerda, the Duchess of Alburquerque and daughter of the 8th Duke of Medinaceli maintained a strong friendship with Doña Luisa Sánchez de Tagle, the daughter of the Marquis of Altamira. This friendship caused the duchess strong disagreement with her husband's actions during the conflict.

On the evening of June 1, 1703, the Duke of Alburquerque ordered the arrest and imprisonment of Don Luis, his nephew and son-in-law Don Pedro for breaching his decree of not obstructing the trial against Don Domingo. Even though only a minority supported immediate sanctions against the Tagle family, the Duke ignored the majority vote of the audiencia who wished for further investigations. Aside from their arrest and imprisonment, the Duke fined each 10,000 pesos, confiscate all their properties and exile them from Mexico.

The feud of two of Spain's most important aristocratic families did not go unnoticed to the Spanish Court as the news reached Madrid. Archbishop Juan Ortega y Montañés, who was also the former viceroy of New Spain and a good friend of the Don Luis, complained bitterly to King Philip V of Spain about the actions of the Duke of Alburquerque and the audencia. in 1704, a representative of the House of Tagle defended the family before the Spanish Court. During the trial, the Marquis of Altamira also charged the Duke of Alburquerque and his minions had forged the records of the Royal Audiencia falsely to express unanimous support for the imprisonment of the members of the Tagle family.

On June 19, 1704, Don Pedro, the rest of the members of the family were released, winning the battle and have the Duke of Alburquerque and his allies pay them a sum of money for all the damages like the 110,000 pesos the Duke of Alburquerque exacted from the Marquis of Altamira and regaining all of their confiscated properties.

== Family ==
Don Luis married Doña Damiana de Dávila y Rojas, daughter of Don Jerónimo de Dávila and Doña María de Rojas. Together they had a daughter, Doña Luisa Sánchez de Tagle, who married her first cousin Don Pedro Sánchez de Tagle. He was succeeded by his nephew and son-in-law Don Pedro Sánchez de Tagle, 2nd Marquis of Altamira.

The Marquis of Altamira is also the ancestor of several important aristocrats, particularly Doña Rosa Juliana Sánchez de Tagle, Marquesa of Torre Tagle and Ana Maria, Empress of Mexico, who was the great great great granddaughter of his brother Don Pedro Sánchez de Tagle y de la Rasa, members of the House of Tagle. He is also an ancestor of Hugo O'Donnell, 7th Duke of Tetuan.
