= Pedro Sánchez de Tagle, 2nd Marquis of Altamira =

Spanish aristocrat (1661–1723)

Don Pedro Sánchez de Tagle y Pérez Bustamante, 2nd Marquis of Altamira (1661–1723) was a Spanish aristocrat and is known as "The Father of Tequila".

== Early life ==
He was the son of Don Andrés Sánchez de Tagle, brother of Don Luis Sánchez de Tagle, 1st Marquis of Altamira and Doña María Pérez de Bustamante. Don Pedro was a member of the Tagle Family, an ancient line of Spanish nobles whose origin can be traced back in the Kingdom of Asturias. Don Pedro was born in Spain but later migrated to Mexico and married his first cousin Doña Luisa Sánchez de Tagle, daughter of the 1st Marquis of Altamira.

== Father of Tequila ==
In 1595, King Philip II of Spain banned the planting of new vineyards in Mexico and other Spanish colonies due to the decline of wine trade with Spain. The main reason behind this is because Mexico is self-sufficient in producing its own wines. The king did this to maintain the market for Spanish products in the New World, and reap the taxes on wine exports. The Marquis of Altamira grabbed the opportunity of the neglected blue agave plants. He built his first Tequila factory in his Hacienda Cuisillos, one of the largest haciendas during that time and amassed a great fortune. The Marquis is now known today as the "Father of Tequila". Don Pedro also served as the Prior of the Consulado, which is the head of the largest corporation in Mexico.

== Feud with the Duke of Alburquerque ==
On 1702, Don Francisco Fernández de la Cueva, 10th Duke of Alburquerque became the viceroy of New Spain. Upon the Duke's rise to power, he clashed with the House of Tagle, which during these times was the richest and most powerful family in Mexico whose influence reached from Spain to the entire Spanish colonies in America and elsewhere. The Duke of Alburquerque accused the Marquis of Altamira and some of his family members of illegal actions that breached the rules given by the King of Spain. Don Pedro, with his uncle, the marqués de Altamira, and his cousin Don Domingo Ruiz de Tagle were imprisoned.

The feud of two of Spain's most important aristocratic families did not go unnoticed to the Spanish Court as the news reached Madrid. Archbishop Juan Ortega y Montañés, who was also the former viceroy of New Spain, complained bitterly to King Philip V of Spain about the actions of the Duke of Alburquerque and the audencia. in 1704, a representative of the House of Tagle defended the family before the Spanish Court. On June 19, 1704, Don Pedro, the rest of the members of the family were released, winning the battle and have the Duke of Alburquerque and his allies pay them an indemnity.

== Family ==
Upon the death of his uncle and father-in-law, Don Pedro succeeded him as the 2nd Marquis of Altamira. He and his wife had had three daughters:

- Doña Manuela Sánchez de Tagle who married Don Pedro Pérez de Tagle, brother of Don Juan Manuel Pérez de Tagle, 1st Marquis of Las Salinas, both which are distant cousins.
- Doña Luisa Sánchez de Tagle who married Don Francisco de Valdivielso, Count of San Pedro del Álamo.
- Doña María Antonia Sánchez de Tagle who married Juan Miranda Argüelles.

He was succeeded by his daughter Doña Manuela Sánchez de Tagle, who became the 3rd Marchioness of Altamira and her husband Don Pedro Pérez de Tagle moved to the Philippines where he would serve as its representative in the Spanish Cortes in 1810.
