= Luisa Pérez de Tagle, 4th Marchioness of Altamira =

Spanish-Mexican aristocrat

Doña Luisa Pérez de Tagle y Sánchez de Tagle, 4th Marchioness of Altamira (1715–1736) was a Spanish-Mexican aristocrat and a member of the House of Tagle, one of Spain's most influential noble families during the 16th to the 19th century.

== Early life ==
Doña Luisa was the only daughter of Don Pedro Pérez de Tagle, brother of the Marquess of Las Salinas and Doña Manuela Sánchez de Tagle, who was by her own right the 3rd Marchioness of Altamira. She was born on May 15, 1715, in Veracruz, Mexico, and was baptized on May 23, 1715.

== Family ==
Doña Luisa succeeded he mother and became the 4th Marchioness of Altamira. She married Don Juan Rodríguez de Albuerne on 1730. Her husband received from her the hacienda of Cuisillos as dowry and he himself became the Marquess Consort of Altamira. In 1737, the King of Spain, Ferdinand VI requested her husband information about the number of patients at the Betlemitas Hospital which led to the creation of the Panteón de Belén years later. Together, the couple had three children:

- Manuel Vicente Rodriguez de Albuerne y Pérez de Tagle who married María de la Paz Isabel Morejón-Girón y Moctezuma, a direct descendant of Emperor Moctezuma II, and a member of the family of the Duke of Moctezuma de Tultengo
- Juana Manuela Rodríguez de Albuerne y Pérez de Tagle
- María Cecilia Rodríguez de Albuerne y Pérez de Tagle who married Domingo Trespalacios de Escandón, a judge in the Audiencia of Mexico and a member of the Council of Indies.

She was the third cousin of Ana Manuela Muñiz de Peo y Sánchez de Tagle, wife of the powerful nobleman Isidro de Huarte y Arrivillaga, parents of Empress Ana Maria of Mexico.

Doña Luisa was succeeded by her son, Don Manuel Rodriguez de Albuerne y Pérez de Tagle as the 5th Marquess of Altamira.
