= Leopoldo O'Donnell =

Spanish general and statesman (1809-1867)

The Most Excellent Leopoldo O'Donnell 1st Duke of Tetuán GE
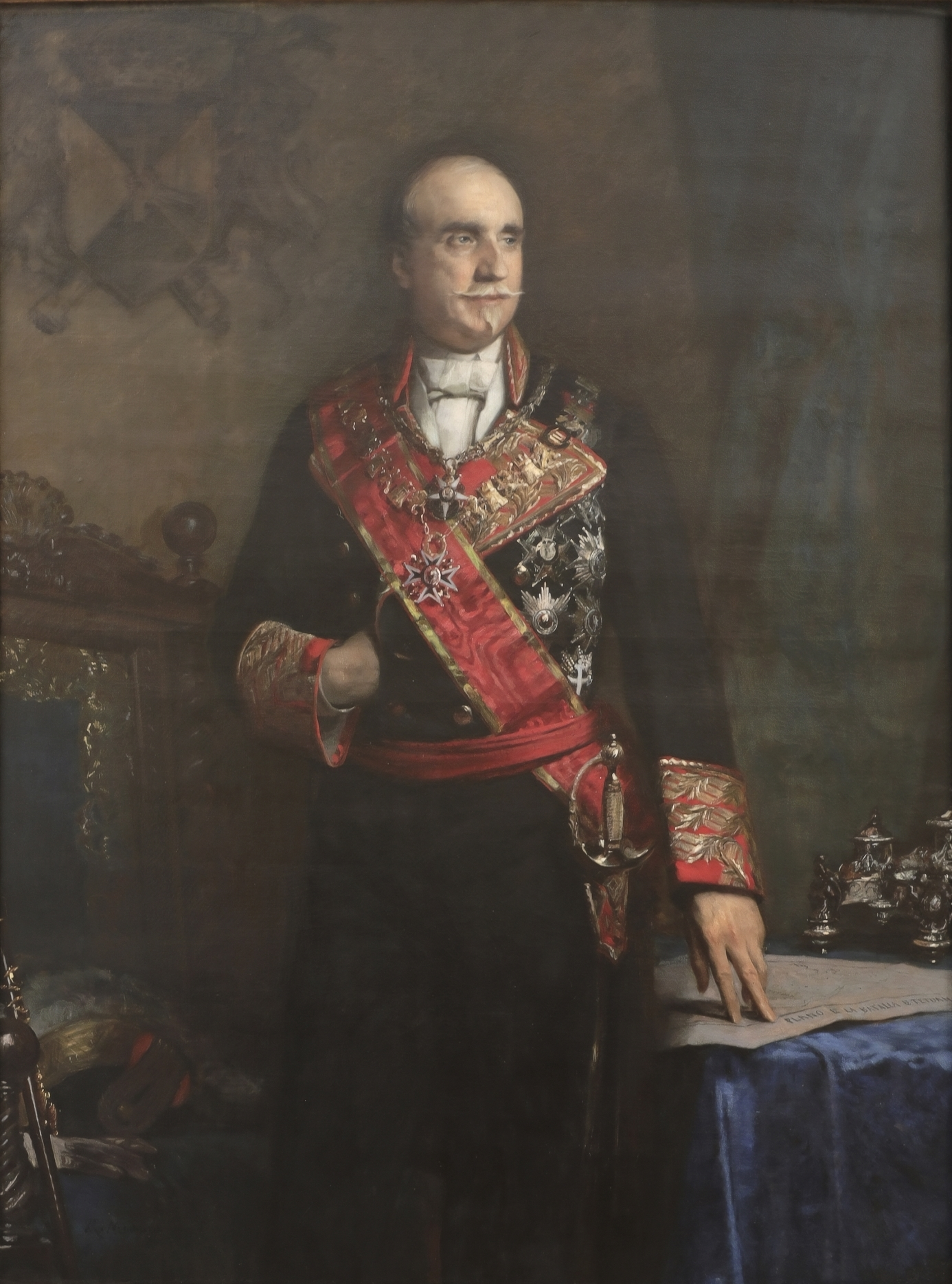

Prime Minister of Spain
- In office 14 July 1856 – 12 October 1856
- Monarch: Isabella II
- Preceded by: The Duke of la Victoria
- Succeeded by: The Duke of Valencia
- In office 30 June 1858 – 2 March 1863
- Monarch: Isabella II
- Preceded by: Francisco Javier de Istúriz
- Succeeded by: The Marquis of Miraflores
- In office 21 June 1865 – 10 July 1866
- Monarch: Isabella II
- Preceded by: The Duke of Valencia
- Succeeded by: The Duke of Valencia

Minister of State of Spain
- Interim
- In office 30 June – 2 July 1858
- Monarch: Isabella II
- Prime Minister: Himself
- Preceded by: Francisco Javier de Istúriz
- Succeeded by: Saturnino Calderón Collantes

Minister of Overseas of Spain
- In office 30 June 1858 – 2 March 1863
- Monarch: Isabella II
- Prime Minister: Himself
- Preceded by: Position created
- Succeeded by: Marquess of Miraflores

Minister of War of Spain
- In office 30 July 1854 – 12 October 1856
- Monarch: Isabella II
- Prime Minister: Himself
- Preceded by: Fernando Fernández de Córdova
- Succeeded by: Marquis of La Solana
- In office 30 June 1858 – 2 March 1863
- Monarch: Isabella II
- Prime Minister: Himself
- Preceded by: Fermín de Ezpeleta
- Succeeded by: Marquess of Havana
- In office 21 June 1865 – 10 July 1866
- Monarch: Isabella II
- Prime Minister: Himself
- Preceded by: Felipe Ribero y Lemoine
- Succeeded by: Duke of Valencia

Minister of the Navy of Spain
- Interim
- In office 25 November – 27 November 1858
- Monarch: Isabella II
- Prime Minister: Himself
- Preceded by: José María Quesada y Bardalonga
- Succeeded by: José MacCrohon y Blake

Governor of Cuba
- In office 21 October 1843 – 29 March 1848
- Monarch: Isabella II
- Prime Minister: Joaquín María López; Salustiano Olózaga; Luis González Bravo; Ramón María Narváez; Marquess of Miraflores; Francisco Javier de Istúriz; Carlos Martínez de Irujo; Joaquín Francisco Pacheco; Florencio García Goyena
- Minister of Overseas: Joaquín de Frías; José Filiberto Portillo; Francisco Armero; Juan Baustista Topete y Viaña; Juan de la Pezuela y Cevallos; Jorgé Pérez Lasso de la Vega; José Baldasano
- Preceded by: Francisco Javier de Ulloa (as interim)
- Succeeded by: Federico Roncali

Personal details
- Born: 12 January 1809 Santa Cruz de Tenerife, Tenerife, Canary Islands, Spain
- Died: 5 November 1867 (aged 58) Biarritz, French Empire
- Resting place: Convent of the Salesas Reales
- Party: Unión Liberal
- Spouse: Manuela Barges
- Relations: Margarita Diez-Colunje y Pombo (cousin)

Leopoldo O'Donnell y Jorris, 1st Duke of Tetuán, GE (12 January 1809 – 5 November 1867), was a Spanish general and Grandee who was Prime Minister of Spain on several occasions.

== Early life ==
He was born at Santa Cruz de Tenerife in the Canary Islands, a son of Carlos O'Donnell (born 1768) and Josefa Jorris y Casaviella. He was a paternal grandson of José O'Donnell and Marie Anne d'Anethan. He was of Irish paternal ancestry, the 11th generation descendant of Calvagh O'Donnell, ri of Tyrconnell, a Gaelic territory in the west of Ulster in the north of Ireland. He had an uncle, Francisco, and an aunt, Beatriz, who married Manuel Pombo y Ante (1769–1829) and had issue.

== Career ==
O'Donnell was a strong supporter of the liberal Cristinos and the regency of Maria Christina of Bourbon-Two Sicilies during the 1830s. When General Baldomero Espartero seized power in 1840, O'Donnell went into exile with Maria Christina and was involved in an attempted coup against Espartero in 1841. O'Donnell was soon back in power and was sent to Cuba as Captain General in October 1843.

O'Donnell was responsible for the 1844 massacre known as the repression of "La Escalera". Thousands of slaves and free-coloured people in Cuba were confined in dungeons, tortured and executed in what became known as the Year of the Lash. In 1854, he made the Vicalvarada, a pronunciamiento against the government and was named Prime Minister for a time. He served as War Minister of the Espartero government.

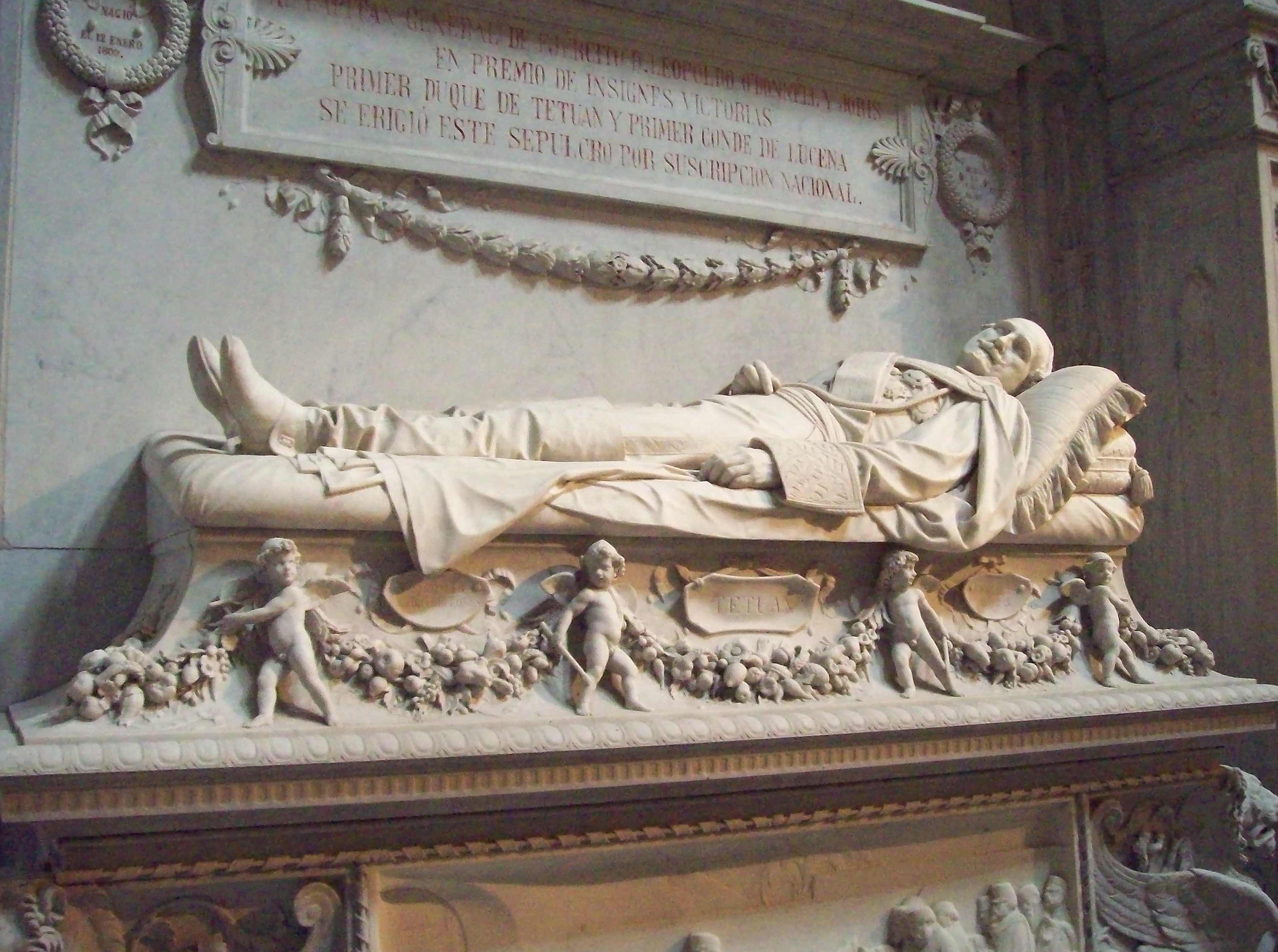
Mausoleum of General The 1st Duke of Tetuán (Madrid)

The Crimean War caused an increase in grain prices due to the blockade of Russia, causing a famine in Galicia during 1854. Riots against power looms spread through Spain, and General O'Donnell intervened, marching on Madrid. Espartero relinquished power in O'Donnell's favour on 14–15 July 1856, and Queen Isabella II asked him to form a government as the 44th Prime Minister of Spain.

For his new administration, O'Donnell formed the Unión Liberal Party, which was designed to combine Progressive, Moderate, and Carlist factions. O'Donnell attempted to define moderate policies for Spain with this new party, advocating a laissez-faire approach and confiscating church land. He was dismissed after only a few months in power on 12 October, and two years of reaction followed.

In later governments, O'Donnell was more careful. His two later administrations worked laboriously to attract foreign investment to improve Spain's railroad infrastructure. He failed to achieve much economic growth, however, and increased industry only in Basque country and Catalonia, both of which already had substantial industrial centres. He was a proponent of a new and aggressive imperial policy, intended principally to expand Spanish territory in Africa, particularly after French successes in Algeria.

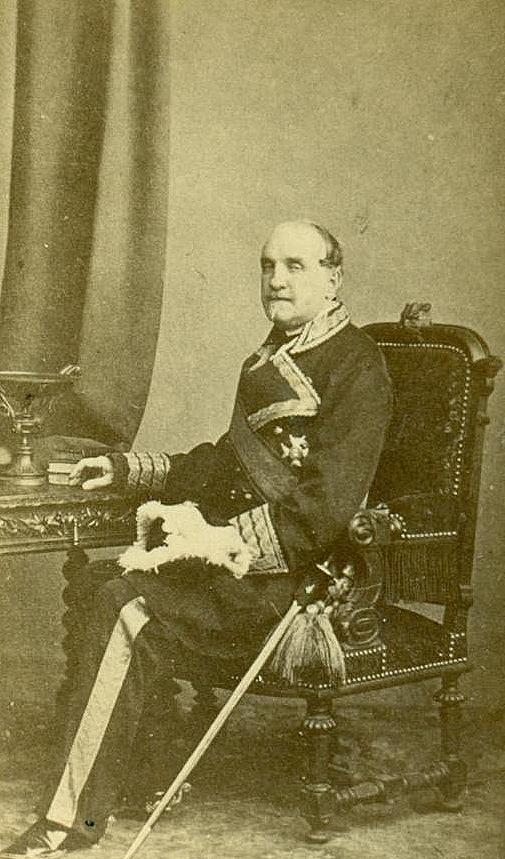
Photograph of General The 1st Duke of Tetuán, c. 1865

In the first administration, he served twice simultaneously as Minister of Foreign Affairs and Prime Minister. He was the 136th Minister of Foreign Affairs and the 48th Prime Minister of Spain between 30 June 1858 and 2 July 1858, and the 138th Minister of Foreign Affairs between 21 October 1860 and 18 January 1863, remaining again solely as Prime Minister until 26 February 1863. His second term as the 53rd Prime Minister started on 21 October 1860.

He took a brief respite from his government in 1860 to command the Spanish army at the Battle of Tétouan and the Battle of Wad Ras during the Spanish-Moroccan War, overseeing the capture of Tétouan. He was rewarded for his abilities in the campaign with the title Duke of Tetuán.

In 1866, he repressed a revolt commanded by General Juan Prim, and was subsequently dismissed by the queen for the brutality of his regime on 11 July 1866. He was the 103rd Grand Cross of the Order of the Tower and Sword.

== Family ==
The Duke of Tetuán was succeeded in his titles by his nephew, Carlos O'Donnell y Álvarez de Abreu (1834 – 1903), 2nd Duke of Tetuán, 2nd Count of Lucena and 9th Marquess of Altamira, who was the son of his brother Carlos O'Donnell y Jorris and wife María del Mar Álvarez de Abreu y Rodríguez de Albuerne. The 2nd Duke of Tetuán married in Madrid on 1 June 1861 to María Josefa de Vargas y Díez de Bulnes (Madrid, 25 July 1838 – 5 November 1905).

== Sources ==
- Chisholm, Hugh, ed. (1911). "O'Donnell, Henry Joseph" . Encyclopædia Britannica. Vol. 20 (11th ed.). Cambridge University Press. pp. 8–9.
  - Fraikin, Jorge Valverde (1991). Titulos Nobiliarios Andaluces. Granada: Andalucia. p. 318.
- O'Cochlain, Ubert (1990). "The O'Donnells of Mayo". North Mayo Historical Society Journal. 11 (4): 67–81. Archived from the original on 22 October 2009.
- O'Hart, John (1892). Irish Pedigrees (5th ed.). Dublin: J. Duffy and Company. pp. 648, 9.

Political offices
| Preceded by The Duke of la Victoria | Prime Minister of Spain; 14 July 1856 – 12 October 1856 | Succeeded by The Duke of Valencia |
| Preceded by Francisco Javier de Istúriz | Prime Minister of Spain; 30 June 1858 – 2 March 1863 | Succeeded by The Marquis of Miraflores |
| Preceded by Francisco Javier de Istúriz | Minister of State; Acting; 30 June 1858 – 2 July 1858 | Succeeded by Saturnino Calderón de la Barca |
| Preceded by The Duke of Valencia | Prime Minister of Spain; 21 June 1865 – 10 July 1866 | Succeeded by The Duke of Valencia |
Spanish nobility
| New creation | Count of Lucena; 25 July 1847 – 5 November 1867 | Succeeded by Carlos O'Donnell |
| New creation | Duke of Tetuan; 20 April 1860 – 5 November 1867 | Succeeded by Carlos O'Donnell |
