= 1920 Spanish general election =

- 19 December 1920 (Congress) (Note: Candidates elected automatically under Article 29 of the Electoral Law were proclaimed on 13 December 1920.); 2 January 1921 (Senate)

All 409 seats in the Congress of Deputies and 180 (of 360) seats in the Senate 205 seats needed for a majority in the Congress of Deputies
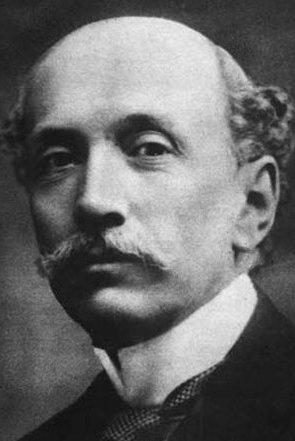

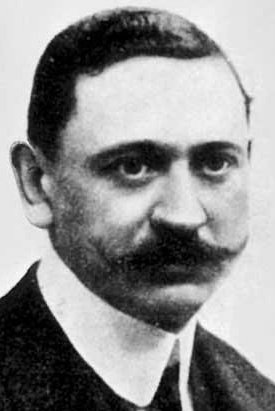

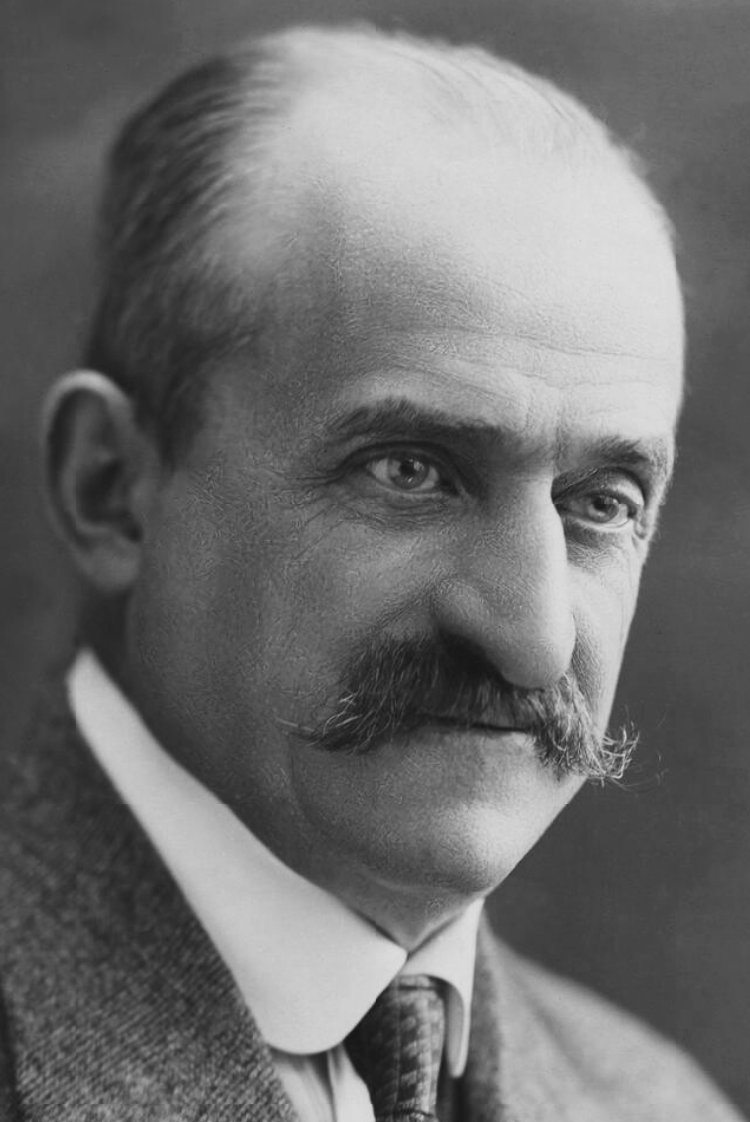

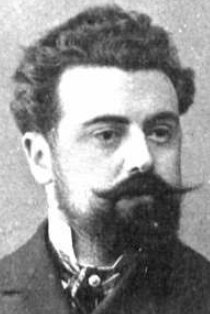

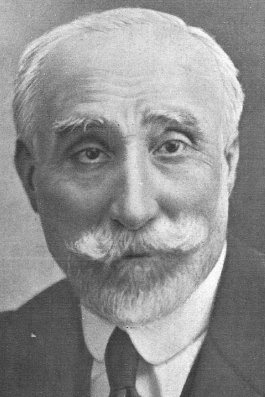

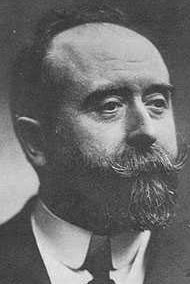
	First party	Second party	Third party
Leader	Eduardo Dato	Marquis of Alhucemas	Count of Romanones
Party	Conservative	Liberal Democratic	Romanonist
Leader since	1913	1913	1912
Leader's seat	Vitoria	Senator for life	Guadalajara
Last election	95 D · 54 S	51 D · 26 S	41 D · 22 S
Seats won	182 D · 72 S	40 D · 23 S	32 D · 20 S
Seat change	▲87 D · ▲18 S	▼11 D · ▼3 S	▼9 D · ▼2 S
	Fourth party	Fifth party	Sixth party
Leader	Santiago Alba	Antonio Maura	Juan de la Cierva
Party	Liberal Left	Maurist	Ciervists
Leader since	1917	1913	1914
Leader's seat	Albuñol	Palma	Mula
Last election	31 D · 10 S	68 D · 27 S	33 D · 10 S
Seats won	30 D · 17 S	24 D · 10 S	21 D · 6 S
Seat change	▼1 D · ▲7 S	▼44 D · ▼17 S	▼12 D · ▼4 S
Prime Minister before election
Eduardo Dato
Conservative
Prime Minister after election
Eduardo Dato
Conservative

A general election was held in Spain on 19 December 1920 (for the Congress of Deputies), and on 2 January 1921 (for the Senate), to elect the members of the 19th Cortes under the Spanish Constitution of 1876, during the Restoration period. All 409 seats in the Congress of Deputies were up for election, as well as 180 of 360 seats in the Senate.

== Background ==
Following the Bourbon Restoration in 1874, the Spanish Constitution of 1876 enshrined Spain as a semi-constitutional monarchy, awarding the monarch—under the royal prerogative—the right of legislative initiative together with the bicameral Cortes; the capacity to veto laws passed by the legislative body; the power to appoint government members (including the prime minister); the ability to grant or deny parliamentary dissolution, the adjournment of legislative sessions and the signature of royal decrees; as well as the title of commander-in-chief of the armed forces. The monarch would play a key role in the turno system by appointing and dismissing governments, which would then organize elections to provide themselves with a parliamentary majority. This informal system allowed the two major "dynastic" political parties at the time, the Conservatives and the Liberals—characterized as oligarchic, elite parties with loose structures dominated by internal factions, each led by powerful individuals—to alternate in power by means of electoral fraud (pucherazo). This was achieved by assigning candidates to districts before the elections were held (encasillado), then arrange their victory through the links between the Ministry of Governance and the territorial clientelistic networks of provincial governors and local bosses (the caciques), excluding minor parties from the power sharing.

== Overview ==
Under the 1876 Constitution, the Spanish Cortes were conceived as "co-legislative bodies", forming a nearly perfect bicameral system. Both the Congress of Deputies and the Senate exercised legislative, oversight and budgetary functions, sharing almost equal powers, except in budget laws (taxation and public credit)—whose first reading corresponded to Congress—and in impeachment processes against government ministers, where Congress handled indictment and the Senate the trial.

=== Date ===
The term of each chamber of the Cortes—the Congress and one-half of the elective part of the Senate—expired five years from the date of their previous election, unless they were dissolved earlier. The previous elections were held on 1 June 1919 for the Congress and on 15 June 1919 for the Senate, which meant that the chambers' terms would have expired on 1 and 15 June 1924, respectively.

The monarch had the prerogative to dissolve both chambers at any given time—either jointly or separately—and call a snap election. There was no constitutional requirement for concurrent elections to the Congress and the Senate, nor for the elective part of the Senate to be renewed in its entirety except in the case that a full dissolution was agreed by the monarch. Still, there was only one case of a separate election (for the Senate in 1877) and no half-Senate elections taking place under the 1876 Constitution.

The Cortes were officially dissolved on 2 October 1920, with the corresponding decree—issued on 27 November—setting election day for 19 December 1920 (Congress) and 2 January 1921 (Senate) and scheduling for both chambers to reconvene on 4 January.

=== Electoral system ===
Voting for the Congress of Deputies was based on universal manhood suffrage, comprising all Spanish national males over 25 years of age with full civil rights, provided they had two years of residence in a Spanish municipality and were not enlisted ranks in active duty. It was compulsory, excepting those over 70, the clergy and—within their territories—trial judges and public notaries. Additional restrictions excluded those deprived of political rights or barred from public office by a final sentence, criminally imprisoned or convicted, legally incapacitated, bankrupt, public debtors, and homeless.

The Congress of Deputies had one seat per 50,000 inhabitants. Of these, those corresponding to larger urban areas were elected in multi-member constituencies using partial block voting: voters in constituencies electing ten seats or more could choose up to four candidates less than the number of seats at stake; in those with between eight and ten seats, up to three less; in those with between four and eight seats, up to two less; and in those with between one and four seats, up to one less. The remaining seats were elected in single-member districts by plurality voting and distributed among the provinces of Spain according to population. Candidates in uncontested seats were automatically elected. (Note: Uncontested districts were those where the number of candidates was equal to or fewer than the available seats. Whenever vacancies remained, a by-election was held to fill the remaining seats.)

As a result of the aforementioned allocation, 311 single-member districts were established, and each Congress multi-member constituency (a total of 28, electing 98 seats) was entitled the following seats:

Seats	Constituencies
8	Madrid
7	Barcelona
5	Palma, Seville
4	Cartagena
3	Alicante, Almería, Badajoz, Burgos, Cádiz, Córdoba, Gran Canaria, Granada, Huelva, Jaén, Jerez de la Frontera, La Coruña, Lugo, Málaga, Murcia, Oviedo, Pamplona, Santander, Tarragona, Tenerife, Valencia, Valladolid, Zaragoza

Voting for the elective part of the Senate was based on censitary suffrage, comprising Spanish male householders of voting age, residing in a Spanish municipality, with full political and civil rights, who met either of the following:

- Being qualified electors (such as archbishops, bishops and cathedral chapter members, in the archdioceses; full academics, in the royal academies; university authorities and professors, in the universities; or provincial deputies);
- Being elected as delegates (either by members with three years of seniority (in the economic societies of Friends of the Country; or by major taxpayers for direct taxes and local authorities, in the local councils).

180 Senate seats were elected using indirect, two-round majority voting. Delegates chosen by local councils—each of which was assigned an initial minimum of one delegate, with one additional delegate for every six councillors—voted for senators together with provincial deputies. The provinces of Barcelona, Madrid and Valencia were allocated four seats each, and the rest three each, for a total of 150. The remaining 30 seats were allocated to special institutional districts (one each), including major archdioceses, royal academies, universities, and economic societies, (Note: The following were considered as the major districts in each category: Archdioceses: Burgos, Granada, Santiago de Compostela, Seville, Tarragona, Toledo, Valencia, Valladolid, and Zaragoza.; Royal academies: Spanish; History; Fine Arts of San Fernando; Exact, Physical and Natural Sciences; Moral and Political Sciences; and Medicine.; Universities: Madrid, Barcelona, Granada, Oviedo, Salamanca, Santiago, Seville, Valencia, Valladolid, and Zaragoza.; Economic societies of Friends of the Country: Madrid, Barcelona, León, Seville, and Valencia.) each elected by their own qualified electors or delegates. Another 180 seats consisted of senators in their own right (such as the monarch's offspring and the heir apparent once coming of age (16), grandees of Spain with an income of Pts 60,000, certain general officers—captain generals and admirals—the Patriarch of the Indies and archbishops, and the heads of higher courts and state institutions (Note: These comprised the Council of State, the Supreme Court, the Court of Auditors and the Supreme Council of War and Navy.) after two years of service), as well as senators for life directly appointed by the monarch.

The law provided for by-elections to fill vacant seats during the legislative term.

== Candidates ==
=== Nomination rules ===
For the Congress, secular Spanish males of voting age, with full civil rights, could run for election. Causes of ineligibility applied to those excluded from voting or meeting any of the incompatibility rules for deputies, as well as to:

- Public contractors, within their relevant territories;
- Holders of a number of territorial posts (such as government-appointed positions, not including government ministers and Central Administration employees; local and provincial employees; and provincial deputation members), within their areas of jurisdiction, during their term of office and up to one year afterwards.
- Servants in the judiciary or the prosecution ministry.

Additionally, candidates were required to either have previously served as deputies or be nominated by two current or former senators (or same-province deputies); three current or former provincial deputies (from the same province); or at least one twentieth of the electorate in the constituencies for which they sought election, disallowing electors from nominating more than one candidate (except in multi-member constituencies, which used the same partial block voting system for nominations as for elections).

For the Senate, eligibility was limited to Spanish males over 35 years of age not under criminal prosecution, disfranchisement nor asset seizure, and who either qualified as senators in their own right or belonged (or had belonged) to certain categories:

- Provided an income of Pts 7,500: the presidents of the Senate and the Congress; deputies serving in three different congresses or eight terms; government ministers; bishops; grandees of Spain not eligible as senators in their own right; and various senior officials after two years of service (such as certain general officers—lieutenant generals and vice admirals—and members of higher courts and state institutions); heads of diplomatic missions abroad (ambassadors after two years, and plenipotentiaries after four); heads and full academics in the royal academies; chief engineers; and full professors with four years of service;
- Provided an income of Pts 20,000 or being taxpayers with a minimum quota of Pts 4,000 in direct taxes (paid two years in advance): Spanish nobility; and former deputies, provincial deputies or mayors in provincial capitals or towns over 20,000;
- Having served as senators before the promulgation of the 1876 Constitution.

Other ineligibility provisions for the Senate also applied to a number of territorial officials within their areas of jurisdiction, during their term of office and up to three months afterwards; public contractors; tax collectors; and public debtors.

Incompatibility rules barred combining:

- The role of senator with other legislative roles (deputy, senator and local councillor, except those in Madrid; and provincial deputies within their respective provinces); or with any public post not explicitly permitted under Senate eligibility requirements;
- The role of deputy with any other civil, military or judicial post, with exceptions—and as many as 40 deputies allowed to simultaneously benefit from these—including a number of specific posts based in Madrid, such as any of the aforementioned ones (provided a public salary of Pts 12,500); senior court officials; university authorities and professors; chief engineers; and general officers.

== Results ==
=== Congress of Deputies ===
← Summary of the 19 December 1920 Congress of Deputies election results →
Parties and alliances	Popular vote		Seats		
Parties and alliances	Votes	%	A.29	Cont.	Total
Conservative Party (PC)			35	147	182
Liberal Democratic Party (PLD)			16	24	40
Romanonist Liberals (PL)			12	20	32
Liberal Left (IL)			9	21	30
Maurist Party (PM)			9	15	24
Ciervist Conservatives (CC)			1	20	21
Regionalist League (LR)			0	17	17
Reformist Party (PRef)			1	8	9
Republican Democracy (DR)			0	7	7
Traditionalist Communion (Jaimist) (CT)			2	4	6
Unaligned Republicans (R)			1	4	5
Agrarian Liberal Party (PLA)			0	5	5
Zamorist Liberals (LZ)			0	5	5
Spanish Socialist Workers' Party (PSOE)			0	4	4
Catalan Republican Party (PRC)			1	1	2
Traditionalist Catholic Party (PCT)			0	1	1
Basque Nationalist Communion (CNV)			1	0	1
Autonomist Monarchist Federation (FMA)			1	0	1
Integrist Party (PI)			1	0	1
Nationalist Democratic Federation (FDN)			0	1	1
Aragonese Union (UA)			0	1	1
Independents (INDEP)			2	12	14
Total			92	317	409
Votes cast / turnout					
Abstentions					
Registered voters					

Seats
PC	44.50%
PLD	9.78%
PL	7.82%
IL	7.33%
PM	5.87%
CC	5.13%
LR	4.16%
PRef	2.20%
DR	1.71%
CT	1.47%
R	1.22%
PLA	1.22%
LZ	1.22%
PSOE	0.98%
PRC	0.49%
PCT	0.24%
CNV	0.24%
FMA	0.24%
PI	0.24%
FDN	0.24%
UA	0.24%
INDEP	3.42%

=== Senate ===
← Summary of the 2 January 1921 Senate of Spain election results →
Parties and alliances	Seats
Conservative Party (PC)	72
Liberal Democratic Party (Prietist) (PLD)	23
Liberal Party (Romanonist) (PL)	20
Liberal Left (Albist) (IL)	17
Maurist Party (PM)	10
Ciervist Conservatives (CC)	6
Regionalist League (LR)	6
Traditionalist Communion (Jaimist) (CT)	4
Reformist Party (PRef)	2
Republican Democracy (DR)	1
Agrarian Liberal Party (Gassetist) (PLA)	1
Zamorist Liberals (LZ)	1
Integrist Party (PI)	1
Independents (INDEP)	7
Archbishops (ARCH)	9
Total elective seats	180

Seats
PC	40.00%
PLD	12.78%
PL	11.11%
IL	9.44%
PM	5.56%
CC	3.33%
LR	3.33%
CT	2.22%
PRef	1.11%
DR	0.56%
PLA	0.56%
LZ	0.56%
PI	0.56%
INDEP	3.89%
ARCH	5.00%

=== Distribution by group ===
Summary of political group distribution in the 19th Restoration Cortes (1920–1923)
Group	Parties and alliances	C	S	Total
PC	Conservative Party (PC)	174	70	254
PC	National Monarchist Union (UMN)	4	2	254
PC	Monarchist Action League (LAM)	4	0	254
PLD	Liberal Democratic Party (Prietist) (PLD)	39	23	63
PLD	National Monarchist Union (UMN)	1	0	63
PL	Liberal Party (Romanonist) (PL)	31	20	52
PL	Monarchist Coalition (MON)	1	0	52
IL	Liberal Left (Albist) (IL)	24	15	47
IL	National Monarchist Union (UMN)	4	2	47
IL	Monarchist Action League (LAM)	1	0	47
IL	Monarchist Coalition (MON)	1	0	47
PM	Maurist Party (PM)	20	10	34
PM	National Monarchist Union (UMN)	2	0	34
PM	Monarchist Coalition (MON)	2	0	34
CC	Ciervist Conservatives (CC)	20	6	27
CC	Monarchist Coalition (MON)	1	0	27
LR	Regionalist League (LR)	17	6	23
PRef	Reformist Party (PRef)	9	2	11
CT	Traditionalist Communion (Jaimist) (CT)	6	4	10
DR	Radical Republican Party (PRR)	5	1	8
DR	Independent Republicans (R.IND)	2	0	8
PLA	Agrarian Liberal Party (Gassetist) (PLA)	5	1	6
LZ	Zamorist Liberals (LZ)	5	1	6
R	Autonomist Republican Union Party (PURA)	3	0	5
R	Republican Federation (FR)	1	0	5
R	Democratic Republican Party (PRD)	1	0	5
PSOE	Spanish Socialist Workers' Party (PSOE)	4	0	4
PRC	Catalan Republican Party (PRC)	2	0	2
PI	Integrist Party (PI)	1	1	2
PCT	Traditionalist Catholic Party (PCT)	1	0	1
CNV	Basque Nationalist Communion (CNV)	1	0	1
FMA	Autonomist Monarchist Federation (FMA)	1	0	1
FDN	Nationalist Democratic Federation (FDN)	1	0	1
UA	Aragonese Union (UA)	1	0	1
INDEP	Independents (INDEP)	2	4	21
INDEP	National Monarchist Union (UMN)	4	0	21
INDEP	Independent Conservatives (C.IND)	3	0	21
INDEP	Independent Liberals (L.IND)	1	2	21
INDEP	Basque Dynastics (Urquijist) (DV)	1	1	21
INDEP	Monarchist Coalition (MON)	1	0	21
INDEP	Independent Republicans (R.IND)	1	0	21
INDEP	Nationalist Republicans (R.NAC)	1	0	21
ARCH	Archbishops (ARCH)	0	9	9
Total		409	180	589

== Bibliography ==
Legislation

- Ley mandando que los distritos para las elecciones de Diputados a Cortes sean los que se expresan en la división adjunta (PDF) (Law). Madrid Gazette (in Spanish). 1 January 1871.
- Constitución de la Monarquía Española (PDF) (Constitution). Madrid Gazette (in Spanish). 30 June 1876.
- Ley electoral de Senadores (PDF) (Law). Madrid Gazette (in Spanish). 8 February 1877.
- Ley electoral de los Diputados a Cortes (PDF) (Law). Madrid Gazette (in Spanish). 28 December 1878.
- Ley enumerando los empleos con los cuales es compatible el cargo de Diputado a Cortes (PDF) (Law). Madrid Gazette (in Spanish). 7 March 1880.
- Ley dividiendo la provincia de Guipúzcoa en distritos para la elección de Diputados a Cortes (PDF) (Law). Madrid Gazette (in Spanish). 23 June 1885.
- Ley dividiendo el distrito electoral de Tarrasa en dos, que se denominarán de Tarrasa y de Sabadell (PDF) (Law). Madrid Gazette (in Spanish). 18 January 1887.
- Ley reformando el art. 4º. de la ley de Incompatibilidades (PDF) (Law). Madrid Gazette (in Spanish). 31 July 1887.
- Ley fijando la división de la provincia de Álava en distritos electorales para Diputados a Cortes (PDF) (Law). Madrid Gazette (in Spanish). 10 July 1888.
- Ley electoral para Diputados a Cortes (PDF) (Law). Madrid Gazette (in Spanish). 26 June 1890.
- Ley disponiendo que las primeras y sucesivas elecciones que se verifiquen en la provincia de Zamora se dividirá en siete distritos en la forma que se expresa (PDF) (Law). Madrid Gazette (in Spanish). 18 June 1895.
- Leyes aprobando la división electoral de las provincias de León y Vizcaya (PDF) (Law). Madrid Gazette (in Spanish). 2 August 1895.
- Leyes aprobando la división electoral en las provincias de Sevilla y de Barcelona (PDF) (Law). Madrid Gazette (in Spanish). 5 July 1898.
- Real decreto disponiendo el número de Senadores que han de elegir las provincias que se citan (PDF) (Royal Decree). Madrid Gazette (in Spanish). 16 March 1899.
- Ley mandando que en lo sucesivo sean cuatro los Diputados a Cortes que elegirá la circunscripción electoral de Cartagena (PDF) (Law). Madrid Gazette (in Spanish). 7 August 1899.
- Ley estableciendo una circunscripción para elegir tres Diputados a Cortes, que la constituirán los cuatro partidos judiciales de Ayamonte, Hueva, Moguer y la Palma, con todas las poblaciones que de ellos forman parte (PDF) (Law). Madrid Gazette (in Spanish). 24 March 1902.
- Ley reformando la Electoral vigente (PDF) (Law). Madrid Gazette (in Spanish). 8 August 1907.
- Ley disponiendo que el territorio de la Nación española que constituye el Archipiélago canario, cuya capitalidad reside en Santa Cruz de Tenerife, conserve su unidad, ateniéndose los servicios públicos en el modo y forma que se determina en esta ley (PDF) (Law). Madrid Gazette (in Spanish). 11 July 1912.
- Real decreto disponiendo que la isla de La Palma (Canarias) se divida, a los efectos de las elecciones para Diputados a Cortes, en dos distritos, que se denominarán de Santa Cruz de la Palma y de Los Llanos (PDF) (Royal Decree). Madrid Gazette (in Spanish). 20 March 1916.
- Real decreto declarando, disueltos el Congreso de los Diputados y la parte electiva del Senado, y declarando que las elecciones de Diputados y Senadores se Celebraran dentro del plazo legal (PDF) (Royal Decree). Madrid Gazette (in Spanish). 2 October 1920.
- Real decreto disponiendo que el día 19 de Diciembre próximo se celebren en todas las provincias del Reino las elecciones de Diputados a Cortes; el 2 de Enero siguiente, las de Senadores, y fijando la fecha del 4 de referido mes de Enero para la reunión de las Cortes en Madrid (PDF) (Royal Decree). Madrid Gazette (in Spanish). 27 November 1920.

Other

- Calero, Antonio María (1987). "La prerrogativa regia en la Restauración: teoría y práctica (1875-1902)" (PDF). Revista de Estudios Políticos (in Spanish) (55). Madrid: Centre for Political and Constitutional Studies: 273–315. ISSN 0048-7694.
- Gómez Ochoa, Fidel (1990). "El gobierno de concentración en el pensamiento y la acción política de Antonio Maura (1918-1922)". Revista de Estudios Políticos (in Spanish) (69). Madrid: Centre for Political and Constitutional Studies: 239–251. ISSN 0048-7694.
- Ortega Álvarez, Luis; Santaolaya Machetti, Pablo (1996). "Evolución histórica del sistema electoral español". Revista de las Cortes Generales (in Spanish). 37. Cortes Generales: 65–107. doi:10.33426/rcg/1996/37/784. ISSN 0213-0130.
- Martorell Linares, Miguel Ángel (1997). "La crisis parlamentaria de 1913-1917. La quiebra del sistema de relaciones parlamentarias de la Restauración" (PDF). Revista de Estudios Políticos (in Spanish) (96). Madrid: Centre for Political and Constitutional Studies: 137–161. ISSN 0048-7694.
- Martínez Ruiz, Enrique; Maqueda Abreu, Consuelo; De Diego, Emilio (1999). Atlas histórico de España. El Reinado de Alfonso XIII (1902-1931) (in Spanish). Vol. 2. Bilbao: Ediciones KAL. pp. 121–132. ISBN 9788470903502.
- Armengol i Segú, Josep; Varela Ortega, José (2001). El poder de la influencia: geografía del caciquismo en España (1875-1923) (in Spanish). Madrid: Marcial Pons. pp. 655–776. ISBN 9788425911521.
- García Muñoz, Montserrat (2002). "La documentación electoral y el fichero histórico de diputados". Revista General de Información y Documentación (in Spanish). 12 (1): 93–137. ISSN 1132-1873.
- Carreras de Odriozola, Albert; Tafunell Sambola, Xavier (2005) [1989]. Estadísticas históricas de España, siglos XIX-XX (PDF) (in Spanish). Vol. 1 (II ed.). Bilbao: Fundación BBVA. pp. 1072–1097. ISBN 84-96515-00-1. Archived from the original (PDF) on 24 September 2015.
- Martínez Relanzón, Alejandro (2017). "Political Modernization in Spain Between 1876 and 1923". Annales Universitatis Mariae Curie-Skłodowska, Sectio K. 24 (1). Madrid: Maria Curie-Skłodowska University: 145–154. doi:10.17951/k.2017.24.1.145. S2CID 159328027.
- Martorell Linares, Miguel (2022). "Personajes: Santiago Alba y Bonifaz" (in Spanish). Royal Academy of History.
- Valle de Juan, María Ángeles (2022). "Personajes: Manuel Allendesalazar y Muñoz de Salazar" (in Spanish). Royal Academy of History.
- Álvarez Tardío, Manuel (2022). "Personajes: Melquíades Álvarez y González Posada" (in Spanish). Royal Academy of History.
- Cuenca Toribio, José Manuel (2022a). "Personajes: Francesc Cambó i Batlle" (in Spanish). Royal Academy of History.
- Seco Serrano, Carlos (2022). "Personajes: Eduardo Dato Iradier" (in Spanish). Royal Academy of History.
- Moreno Luzón, Javier (2022). "Personajes: Álvaro de Figueroa y Torres" (in Spanish). Royal Academy of History.
- Sainz de Vicuña y García-Prieto, Manuel (2022). "Personajes: Manuel García Prieto" (in Spanish). Royal Academy of History.
- Cuenca Toribio, José Manuel (2022b). "Personajes: Antonio Maura y Montaner" (in Spanish). Royal Academy of History.
- Hijano Pérez, Ángeles (2022). "Personajes: Joaquín Sánchez de Toca y Calvo" (in Spanish). Royal Academy of History.
