= 1914 Spanish general election =

- 8 March 1914 (Congress) (Note: Congress candidates elected automatically under Article 29 of the Electoral Law were proclaimed on 1 March 1914.); 22 March 1914 (Senate)

All 408 seats in the Congress of Deputies and 180 (of 360) seats in the Senate 205 seats needed for a majority in the Congress of Deputies
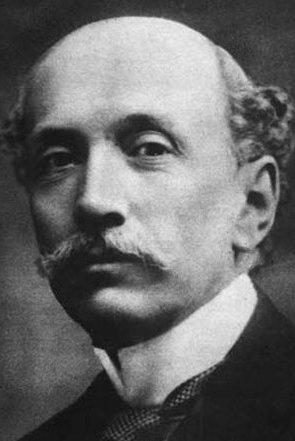

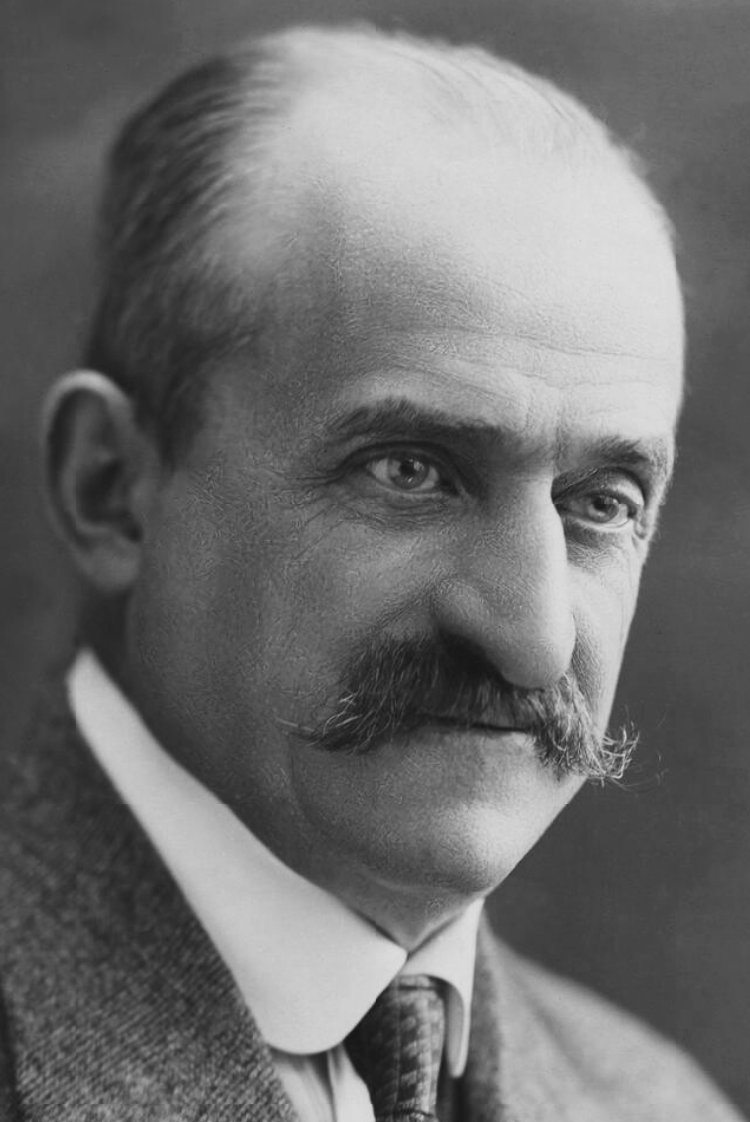

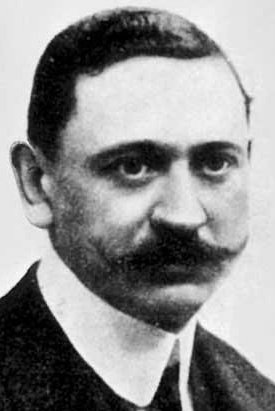

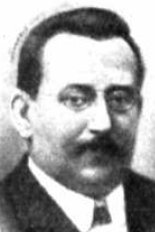

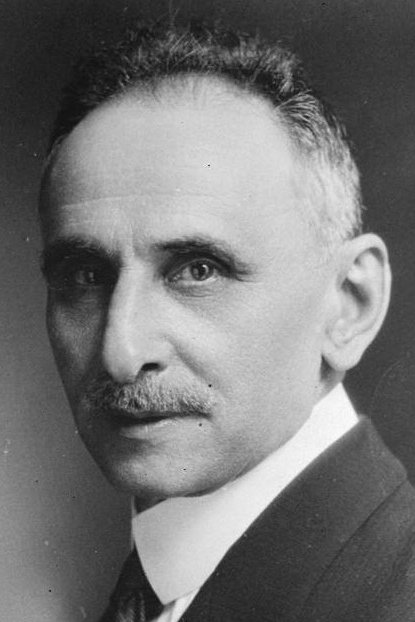

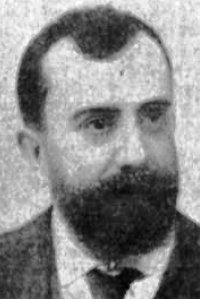
	First party	Second party	Third party
Leader	Eduardo Dato	Count of Romanones	Marquis of Alhucemas
Party	Conservative	Liberal	Liberal Democratic
Leader since	1913	1912	1913
Leader's seat	Vitoria	Guadalajara	Ponferrada
Last election	109 D · 46 S	224 D · 104 S (Note: Results for PDM–PL in the 1910 election.)	Did not contest
Seats won	225 D · 95 S	84 D · 41 S	33 D · 12 S
Seat change	▲116 D · ▲49 S	▼140 D · ▼63 S	▲33 D · ▲12 S
	Fourth party	Fifth party	Sixth party
Leader	Enric Prat de la Riba	Melquíades Álvarez	Roberto Castrovido
Party	Regionalist	Reformist	Republican–Socialist
Leader since	1902	1912	1914
Leader's seat	Did not run	Castropol	Madrid
Last election	8 D · 5 S	Did not contest	18 D · 3 S (Note: Results for UR (14 deputies and 2 senators), PRF (3 deputies and 1 senator) and PSOE (1 deputy and 0 senators) in the 1910 election.)
Seats won	13 D · 6 S	12 D · 3 S	12 D · 2 S
Seat change	▲5 D · ▲1 S	▲12 D · ▲3 S	▼6 D · ▼1 S
Prime Minister before election
Eduardo Dato
Conservative
Prime Minister after election
Eduardo Dato
Conservative

A general election was held in Spain on 8 March 1914 (for the Congress of Deputies), and on 22 March 1914 (for the Senate), to elect the members of the 15th Cortes under the Spanish Constitution of 1876, during the Restoration period. All 408 seats in the Congress of Deputies were up for election, as well as 180 of 360 seats in the Senate.

The informal turno system—which had allowed the country's two main parties, the Conservatives and the Liberals, to alternate in power by determining election outcomes in advance through caciquism and electoral fraud—broke down following Antonio Maura's downfall in 1909, as the latter had come to see the Liberal rise to power as the liquidation of the Pact of El Pardo. The government of Prime Minister José Canalejas attempted to enforce a liberal democratic regenerationism to curb the country's problems, seeing the abolition of consumption taxes, the introduction of compulsory military service, laws addressing the social question, the legal groundwork for the establishment of the Commonwealth of Catalonia in order to placate rising Catalan regionalism and the establishment of a Spanish protectorate in Morocco. But his assassination before he could fully realize his agenda (such as fulfilling the separation of church and state or the rebuilding of the turno with the Conservatives) plunged his plans—and his party—into chaos.

King Alfonso XIII entrusted the Count of Romanones with the formation of a new cabinet, but an internal crisis over the leadership of the Liberal Party prompted supporters of the Marquis of Alhucemas to split into the Liberal Democratic Party. As a result, Romanones's government fell in October 1913 after being defeated in a vote of confidence. Maura rejected the King's mandate to continue the turno, leading to the appointment of Eduardo Dato as prime minister instead. This fragmented the Conservative Party into the Maurists (followers of Maura's doctrine), the "suitable ones" (defenders of the turno system) and the Ciervists (who advocated for Conservative unity of action without affiliating themselves with either faction).

The election saw the Conservative bloc winning a majority of seats in both chambers, but internal infighting between the Maurist and Datist factions would leave the government in an unstable minority position. The Liberals ran divided between the supporters of Romanones and the liberal-democratic faction of the Marquis of Alhucemas. The Republican–Socialist Conjunction had been weakened by the departures of both the Reformist Party of Melquíades Álvarez (representing a moderate republicanism) and Alejandro Lerroux's Radical Republican Party.

== Background ==
Following the Bourbon Restoration in 1874, the Spanish Constitution of 1876 enshrined Spain as a semi-constitutional monarchy, awarding the monarch—under the royal prerogative—the right of legislative initiative together with the bicameral Cortes; the capacity to veto laws passed by the legislative body; the power to appoint government members (including the prime minister); the ability to grant or deny parliamentary dissolution, the adjournment of legislative sessions and the signature of royal decrees; as well as the title of commander-in-chief of the armed forces. The monarch would play a key role in the turno system by appointing and dismissing governments, which would then organize elections to provide themselves with a parliamentary majority. This informal system allowed the two major "dynastic" political parties at the time, the Conservatives and the Liberals—characterized as oligarchic, elite parties with loose structures dominated by internal factions, each led by powerful individuals—to alternate in power by means of electoral fraud (pucherazo). This was achieved by assigning candidates to districts before the elections were held (encasillado), then arrange their victory through the links between the Ministry of Governance and the territorial clientelistic networks of provincial governors and local bosses (the caciques), excluding minor parties from the power sharing.

The Restoration system had entered a phase of decline following the national trauma from the Spanish–American War (the "1898 disaster") and the absence of politically authoritative figureheads since the deaths of Antonio Cánovas del Castillo (1897) and Práxedes Mateo Sagasta (1903), weakening the internal unity of both dynastic parties and strengthening the position of faction leaders and local caciques as power brokers. Concurrently, the anti-monarchist opposition became increasingly competitive in urban and some rural districts, partly due to the introduction of universal suffrage since 1890, partly due to the progressive weakening of the pro-government electoral apparatus.

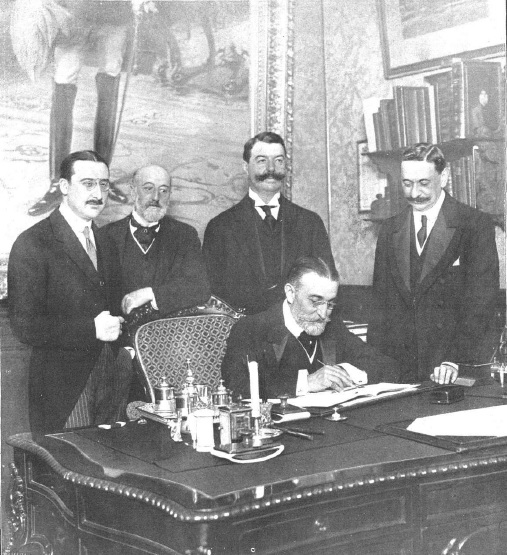
The Franco–Spanish Treaty of 1912 brought about the Spanish protectorate in Morocco.

The 1909–1910 government crisis had seen both the fall of the Conservative government of Antonio Maura by political pressure from the Liberals under Segismundo Moret, and the latter losing the support of the various factions within his party and being replaced by José Canalejas. As prime minister, Canalejas attempted to enforce his own vision of regenerationism (a "democratic regeneration") to "nationalize" the monarchy and address the country's problems, which at the time included: growing tensions within the armed forces, Church–State relations, the Moroccan and social questions—with an increase in strike action and the emergence of the National Confederation of Labour (CNT), seeing episodes such as the Cullera events—and rising Catalan regionalism. This period saw the implementation of various reforms, such as the abolition of consumption taxes, the introduction compulsory military servicet, or a more appropriate regulation of women's working conditions (the "Law of the Chair" or ley de la silla).

Canalejas's aim to curb the Catholic Church's influence over public education resulted in a temporary rupture of relations with the Holy See, as well as a media campaign accusing Canalejas of fostering anti-clericalism. Discreet negotiations saw the approval of the Padlock Law (ley del candado) in December 1910, which restricted the establishment of new religious orders during the next two years. His government also laid the legal foundations for the creation of commonwealths of provinces with limited powers in an attempt to placate the ambitions of the Regionalist League, paving the way for the Commonwealth of Catalonia in 1914. Canalejas refrained from intervening in the 5 October 1910 revolution that overthrew the Portuguese monarchy, but had to tackle its repercussions during the pro-republican mutiny aboard the ironclad Numancia in August 1911. The successful Kert campaign helped bring about the Spanish protectorate in Morocco, with the signing of the Franco–Spanish Treaty of 1912.

Canalejas also attempted to rebuild the turno system through a conciliatory stance towards the Conservatives. Their leader, Maura, had come to see the Pact of El Pardo as liquidated following his fall from power in 1909, declaring an "implacable hostility" to the Liberals in power—equivalent to the official severance of solidarity ties between the two dynastic parties and a renounce to the power alternation—as long as they did not publicly retract their actions of the previous biennium. In the ensuing years, the Conservatives would divide among those adhering to Maura's political doctrine against the turno (the Maurist faction or mauristas), and those advocating for continuity out of loyalty to the monarchy and a desire not to be excluded from power (who would become known as the idóneos or "suitable ones").

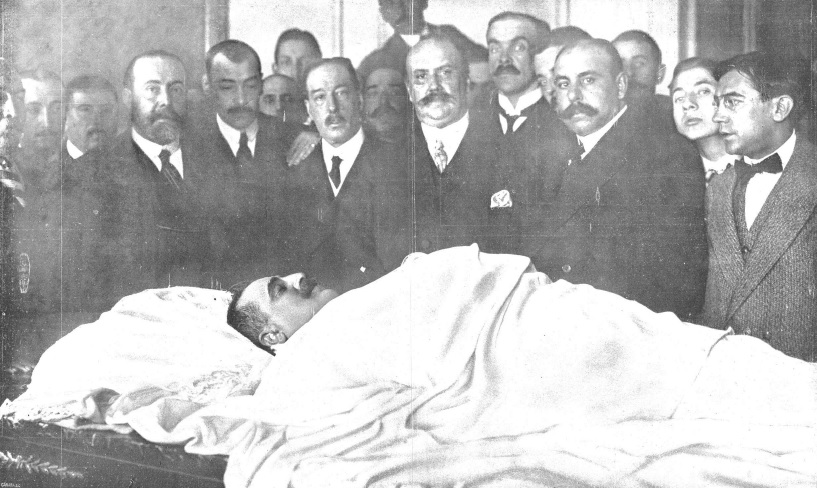
The assassination of José Canalejas in 1912 left the Liberal Party without a solid leadership.

The assassination of Canalejas in November 1912 put an end to his agenda and plunged his party into chaos. King Alfonso XIII's initial decision to appoint the president of the Congress of Deputies, the Count of Romanones, as prime minister, was met with outrage by Maura—deepening his disaffection with the "failed" turno—as well as by supporters of minister of state under Canalejas, the Marquis of Alhucemas, who also aspired to the Liberal leadership. The Alhucemas–Romanones feud and the leadership crisis within the Liberal Party, coupled with the debate on the Law of Commonwealths, brought about the former's split into the Liberal Democratic Party in the summer of 1913 and the latter's downfall in a Senate vote of confidence on 25 October. Maura's refusal to accept the King's mandate and maintain the turno caused a schism within the Conservative Party between "maurists" and "suitable ones", leading Alfonso XIII to hand over power to the "suitable" Eduardo Dato. A third Conservative faction led by Juan de la Cierva—governance minister under Maura—supported restoring unity of action between idóneos and mauristas, without affiliating itself to either.

Within the republican opposition, the Reformist Party was formed in 1912 by Melquíades Álvarez, Gumersindo de Azcárate and Benito Pérez Galdós, representing a moderate, accidentalist and democratic republicanism. Concurrently, disagreements with Alejandro Lerroux's Radical Republican Party led to its departure from the Republican–Socialist Conjunction.

== Overview ==
Under the 1876 Constitution, the Spanish Cortes were conceived as "co-legislative bodies", forming a nearly perfect bicameral system. Both the Congress of Deputies and the Senate exercised legislative, oversight and budgetary functions, sharing almost equal powers, except in budget laws (taxation and public credit)—whose first reading corresponded to Congress—and in impeachment processes against government ministers, where Congress handled indictment and the Senate the trial.

=== Date ===
The term of each chamber of the Cortes—the Congress and one-half of the elective part of the Senate—expired five years from the date of their previous election, unless they were dissolved earlier. The previous elections were held on 8 May 1910 for the Congress and on 22 May 1910 for the Senate, which meant that the chambers' terms would have expired on 8 and 22 May 1915, respectively.

The monarch had the prerogative to dissolve both chambers at any given time—either jointly or separately—and call a snap election. There was no constitutional requirement for concurrent elections to the Congress and the Senate, nor for the elective part of the Senate to be renewed in its entirety except in the case that a full dissolution was agreed by the monarch. Still, there was only one case of a separate election (for the Senate in 1877) and no half-Senate elections taking place under the 1876 Constitution.

The Cortes were officially dissolved on 2 January and 13 February 1914, with the corresponding decree setting election day for 8 March (Congress) and 22 March 1914 (Senate) and scheduling for both chambers to reconvene on 2 April.

=== Electoral system ===
Voting for the Congress of Deputies was based on universal manhood suffrage, comprising all Spanish national males over 25 years of age with full civil rights, provided they had two years of residence in a Spanish municipality and were not enlisted ranks in active duty. It was compulsory, excepting those over 70, the clergy and—within their territories—trial judges and public notaries. Additional restrictions excluded those deprived of political rights or barred from public office by a final sentence, criminally imprisoned or convicted, legally incapacitated, bankrupt, public debtors, and homeless.

The Congress of Deputies had one seat per 50,000 inhabitants. Of these, those corresponding to larger urban areas were elected in multi-member constituencies using partial block voting: voters in constituencies electing ten seats or more could choose up to four candidates less than the number of seats at stake; in those with between eight and ten seats, up to three less; in those with between four and eight seats, up to two less; and in those with between one and four seats, up to one less. The remaining seats were elected in single-member districts by plurality voting and distributed among the provinces of Spain according to population. Candidates in uncontested seats were automatically elected. (Note: Uncontested districts were those where the number of candidates was equal to or fewer than the available seats. Whenever vacancies remained, a by-election was held to fill the remaining seats.)

As a result of the aforementioned allocation, 310 single-member districts were established, and each Congress multi-member constituency (a total of 28, electing 98 seats) was entitled the following seats:

Seats	Constituencies
8	Madrid
7	Barcelona
5	Palma, Seville
4	Cartagena
3	Alicante, Almería, Badajoz, Burgos, Cádiz, Córdoba, Gran Canaria, Granada, Huelva, Jaén, Jerez de la Frontera, La Coruña, Lugo, Málaga, Murcia, Oviedo, Pamplona, Santander, Tarragona, Tenerife, Valencia, Valladolid, Zaragoza

Voting for the elective part of the Senate was based on censitary suffrage, comprising Spanish male householders of voting age, residing in a Spanish municipality, with full political and civil rights, who met either of the following:

- Being qualified electors (such as archbishops, bishops and cathedral chapter members, in the archdioceses; full academics, in the royal academies; university authorities and professors, in the universities; or provincial deputies);
- Being elected as delegates (either by members with three years of seniority (in the economic societies of Friends of the Country; or by major taxpayers for direct taxes and local authorities, in the local councils).

180 Senate seats were elected using indirect, two-round majority voting. Delegates chosen by local councils—each of which was assigned an initial minimum of one delegate, with one additional delegate for every six councillors—voted for senators together with provincial deputies. The provinces of Barcelona, Madrid and Valencia were allocated four seats each, and the rest three each, for a total of 150. The remaining 30 seats were allocated to special institutional districts (one each), including major archdioceses, royal academies, universities, and economic societies, (Note: The following were considered as the major districts in each category: Archdioceses: Burgos, Granada, Santiago de Compostela, Seville, Tarragona, Toledo, Valencia, Valladolid, and Zaragoza.; Royal academies: Spanish; History; Fine Arts of San Fernando; Exact, Physical and Natural Sciences; Moral and Political Sciences; and Medicine.; Universities: Madrid, Barcelona, Granada, Oviedo, Salamanca, Santiago, Seville, Valencia, Valladolid, and Zaragoza.; Economic societies of Friends of the Country: Madrid, Barcelona, León, Seville, and Valencia.) each elected by their own qualified electors or delegates. Another 180 seats consisted of senators in their own right (such as the monarch's offspring and the heir apparent once coming of age (16), grandees of Spain with an income of Pts 60,000, certain general officers—captain generals and admirals—the Patriarch of the Indies and archbishops, and the heads of higher courts and state institutions (Note: These comprised the Council of State, the Supreme Court, the Court of Auditors and the Supreme Council of War and Navy.) after two years of service), as well as senators for life directly appointed by the monarch.

The law provided for by-elections to fill vacant seats during the legislative term.

== Candidates ==
=== Nomination rules ===
For the Congress, secular Spanish males of voting age, with full civil rights, could run for election. Causes of ineligibility applied to those excluded from voting or meeting any of the incompatibility rules for deputies, as well as to:

- Public contractors, within their relevant territories;
- Holders of a number of territorial posts (such as government-appointed positions, not including government ministers and Central Administration employees; local and provincial employees; and provincial deputation members), within their areas of jurisdiction, during their term of office and up to one year afterwards.
- Servants in the judiciary or the prosecution ministry.

Additionally, candidates were required to either have previously served as deputies or be nominated by two current or former senators (or same-province deputies); three current or former provincial deputies (from the same province); or at least one twentieth of the electorate in the constituencies for which they sought election, disallowing electors from nominating more than one candidate (except in multi-member constituencies, which used the same partial block voting system for nominations as for elections).

For the Senate, eligibility was limited to Spanish males over 35 years of age not under criminal prosecution, disfranchisement nor asset seizure, and who either qualified as senators in their own right or belonged (or had belonged) to certain categories:

- Provided an income of Pts 7,500: the presidents of the Senate and the Congress; deputies serving in three different congresses or eight terms; government ministers; bishops; grandees of Spain not eligible as senators in their own right; and various senior officials after two years of service (such as certain general officers—lieutenant generals and vice admirals—and members of higher courts and state institutions); heads of diplomatic missions abroad (ambassadors after two years, and plenipotentiaries after four); heads and full academics in the royal academies; chief engineers; and full professors with four years of service;
- Provided an income of Pts 20,000 or being taxpayers with a minimum quota of Pts 4,000 in direct taxes (paid two years in advance): Spanish nobility; and former deputies, provincial deputies or mayors in provincial capitals or towns over 20,000;
- Having served as senators before the promulgation of the 1876 Constitution.

Other ineligibility provisions for the Senate also applied to a number of territorial officials within their areas of jurisdiction, during their term of office and up to three months afterwards; public contractors; tax collectors; and public debtors.

Incompatibility rules barred combining:

- The role of senator with other legislative roles (deputy, senator and local councillor, except those in Madrid; and provincial deputies within their respective provinces); or with any public post not explicitly permitted under Senate eligibility requirements;
- The role of deputy with any other civil, military or judicial post, with exceptions—and as many as 40 deputies allowed to simultaneously benefit from these—including a number of specific posts based in Madrid, such as any of the aforementioned ones (provided a public salary of Pts 12,500); senior court officials; university authorities and professors; chief engineers; and general officers.

== Results ==
=== Congress of Deputies ===
← Summary of the 8 March 1914 Congress of Deputies election results →
Parties and alliances	Popular vote		Seats		
Parties and alliances	Votes	%	A.29	Cont.	Total
Conservative Party (PC)			48	177	225
Liberal Party (PL)			22	62	84
Liberal Democratic Party (PLD)			12	21	33
Regionalist League (LR)			1	12	13
Reformist Party (PRef)			3	9	12
Republican–Socialist Conjunction (CRS)			1	11	12
Republican Coalition (PRR–UFNR)			1	10	11
Jaimist–Integrist Coalition (CT–PI)			2	6	8
Social Defence Committee (CDS)			0	1	1
Autonomist Republican Union Party (PURA)			0	1	1
Independents (INDEP)			3	5	8
Total			93	315	408
Votes cast / turnout					
Abstentions					
Registered voters					

Seats
PC	55.15%
PL	20.59%
PLD	8.09%
LR	3.19%
PRef	2.94%
CRS	2.94%
PRR–UFNR	2.70%
CT–PI	1.96%
CDS	0.25%
PURA	0.25%
INDEP	1.96%

=== Senate ===
← Summary of the 22 March 1914 Senate of Spain election results →
Parties and alliances	Seats
Conservative Party (PC)	95
Liberal Party (PL)	41
Liberal Democratic Party (PLD)	12
Regionalist League (LR)	6
Jaimist–Integrist Coalition (CT–PI)	4
Reformist Party (PRef)	3
Republican–Socialist Conjunction (CRS)	2
Republican Coalition (PRR–UFNR)	1
Social Defence Committee (CDS)	1
Independents (INDEP)	6
Archbishops (ARCH)	9
Total elective seats	180

Seats
PC	52.78%
PL	22.78%
PLD	6.67%
LR	3.33%
CT–PI	2.22%
PRef	1.67%
CRS	1.11%
PRR–UFNR	0.56%
CDS	0.56%
INDEP	3.33%
ARCH	5.00%

=== Distribution by group ===
Summary of political group distribution in the 15th Restoration Cortes (1914–1916)
Group	Parties and alliances	C	S	Total
PC	Conservative Party (PC)	190	78	320
PC	Maurist Conservatives (CM)	25	14	320
PC	Ciervist Conservatives (CC)	9	2	320
PC	Monarchist Coalition (MON)	1	0	320
PC	Agrarian League (LA)	0	1	320
PL	Liberal Party (PL)	83	41	125
PL	Monarchist Coalition (MON)	1	0	125
PLD	Liberal Democratic Party (PLD)	33	12	45
LR	Regionalist League (LR)	13	6	19
PRef	Reformist Party (PRef)	12	3	15
CRS	Republican Party (PRep)	10	2	14
CRS	Spanish Socialist Workers' Party (PSOE)	1	0	14
CRS	Independent Republicans (R.IND)	1	0	14
PRR– UFNR	Republican Nationalist Federal Union (UFNR)	6	1	12
PRR– UFNR	Radical Republican Party (PRR)	5	0	12
CT–PI	Traditionalist Communion (Jaimist) (CT)	5	2	12
CT–PI	Integrist Party (PI)	3	2	12
CDS	Monarchist Coalition (MON)	1	1	2
PURA	Autonomist Republican Union Party (PURA)	1	0	1
INDEP	Independents (INDEP)	4	3	14
INDEP	Basque Dynastics (Urquijist) (DV)	1	3	14
INDEP	Independent Catholics (CAT)	2	0	14
INDEP	Independent Liberals (L.IND)	1	0	14
ARCH	Archbishops (ARCH)	0	9	9
Total		408	180	588

== Bibliography ==
Legislation

- Ley mandando que los distritos para las elecciones de Diputados a Cortes sean los que se expresan en la división adjunta (PDF) (Law). Madrid Gazette (in Spanish). 1 January 1871.
- Constitución de la Monarquía Española (PDF) (Constitution). Madrid Gazette (in Spanish). 30 June 1876.
- Ley electoral de Senadores (PDF) (Law). Madrid Gazette (in Spanish). 8 February 1877.
- Ley electoral de los Diputados a Cortes (PDF) (Law). Madrid Gazette (in Spanish). 28 December 1878.
- Ley enumerando los empleos con los cuales es compatible el cargo de Diputado a Cortes (PDF) (Law). Madrid Gazette (in Spanish). 7 March 1880.
- Ley dividiendo la provincia de Guipúzcoa en distritos para la elección de Diputados a Cortes (PDF) (Law). Madrid Gazette (in Spanish). 23 June 1885.
- Ley dividiendo el distrito electoral de Tarrasa en dos, que se denominarán de Tarrasa y de Sabadell (PDF) (Law). Madrid Gazette (in Spanish). 18 January 1887.
- Ley reformando el art. 4º. de la ley de Incompatibilidades (PDF) (Law). Madrid Gazette (in Spanish). 31 July 1887.
- Ley fijando la división de la provincia de Álava en distritos electorales para Diputados a Cortes (PDF) (Law). Madrid Gazette (in Spanish). 10 July 1888.
- Ley electoral para Diputados a Cortes (PDF) (Law). Madrid Gazette (in Spanish). 26 June 1890.
- Ley disponiendo que las primeras y sucesivas elecciones que se verifiquen en la provincia de Zamora se dividirá en siete distritos en la forma que se expresa (PDF) (Law). Madrid Gazette (in Spanish). 18 June 1895.
- Leyes aprobando la división electoral de las provincias de León y Vizcaya (PDF) (Law). Madrid Gazette (in Spanish). 2 August 1895.
- Leyes aprobando la división electoral en las provincias de Sevilla y de Barcelona (PDF) (Law). Madrid Gazette (in Spanish). 5 July 1898.
- Real decreto disponiendo el número de Senadores que han de elegir las provincias que se citan (PDF) (Royal Decree). Madrid Gazette (in Spanish). 16 March 1899.
- Ley mandando que en lo sucesivo sean cuatro los Diputados a Cortes que elegirá la circunscripción electoral de Cartagena (PDF) (Law). Madrid Gazette (in Spanish). 7 August 1899.
- Ley estableciendo una circunscripción para elegir tres Diputados a Cortes, que la constituirán los cuatro partidos judiciales de Ayamonte, Hueva, Moguer y la Palma, con todas las poblaciones que de ellos forman parte (PDF) (Law). Madrid Gazette (in Spanish). 24 March 1902.
- Ley reformando la Electoral vigente (PDF) (Law). Madrid Gazette (in Spanish). 8 August 1907.
- Ley disponiendo que el territorio de la Nación española que constituye el Archipiélago canario, cuya capitalidad reside en Santa Cruz de Tenerife, conserve su unidad, ateniéndose los servicios públicos en el modo y forma que se determina en esta ley (PDF) (Law). Madrid Gazette (in Spanish). 11 July 1912.
- Real decreto declarando disuelto el Congreso de los Diputados (PDF) (Royal Decree). Madrid Gazette (in Spanish). 2 January 1914.
- Real decreto declarando disuelta la parte electiva del Senado; que las Cortes se reunan en Madrid el día 2 de Abril próximo, y que las elecciones de Diputados a Cortes se verifiquen en todas las provincias el día 8 de Marzo del año actual y las de Senadores el día 22 de dicho mes (PDF) (Royal Decree). Madrid Gazette (in Spanish). 13 February 1914.

Other

- Soldevilla, Fernando (1910). El Año Político 1909 (in Spanish). Madrid: National Library of Spain.
- Soldevilla, Fernando (1914). El Año Político 1913 (in Spanish). Madrid: National Library of Spain.
- Fernández Almagro, Melchor (1943). "Las Cortes del siglo XIX y la práctica electoral" (PDF). Revista de Estudios Políticos (in Spanish) (9–10). Madrid: Centre for Political and Constitutional Studies: 383–419. ISSN 0048-7694.
- Dendle, Brian John (1986). "Galdós in context: The Republican Years, 1907-1914". Anales Galdosianos (21). Alicante: Miguel de Cervantes Virtual Library: 33–44. ISSN 0569-9924.
- Calero, Antonio María (1987). "La prerrogativa regia en la Restauración: teoría y práctica (1875-1902)" (PDF). Revista de Estudios Políticos (in Spanish) (55). Madrid: Centre for Political and Constitutional Studies: 273–315. ISSN 0048-7694.
- Ortega Álvarez, Luis; Santaolaya Machetti, Pablo (1996). "Evolución histórica del sistema electoral español". Revista de las Cortes Generales (in Spanish). 37. Cortes Generales: 65–107. doi:10.33426/rcg/1996/37/784. ISSN 0213-0130.
- Martorell Linares, Miguel Ángel (1997). "La crisis parlamentaria de 1913-1917. La quiebra del sistema de relaciones parlamentarias de la Restauración" (PDF). Revista de Estudios Políticos (in Spanish) (96). Madrid: Centre for Political and Constitutional Studies: 137–161. ISSN 0048-7694.
- Martínez Ruiz, Enrique; Maqueda Abreu, Consuelo; De Diego, Emilio (1999). Atlas histórico de España. El Reinado de Alfonso XIII (1902-1931) (in Spanish). Vol. 2. Bilbao: Ediciones KAL. pp. 121–132. ISBN 9788470903502.
- Armengol i Segú, Josep; Varela Ortega, José (2001). El poder de la influencia: geografía del caciquismo en España (1875-1923) (in Spanish). Madrid: Marcial Pons. pp. 655–776. ISBN 9788425911521.
- García Muñoz, Montserrat (2002). "La documentación electoral y el fichero histórico de diputados". Revista General de Información y Documentación (in Spanish). 12 (1): 93–137. ISSN 1132-1873.
- Carreras de Odriozola, Albert; Tafunell Sambola, Xavier (2005) [1989]. Estadísticas históricas de España, siglos XIX-XX (PDF) (in Spanish). Vol. 1 (II ed.). Bilbao: Fundación BBVA. pp. 1072–1097. ISBN 84-96515-00-1. Archived from the original (PDF) on 24 September 2015.
- Aguilar Gavilán, Enrique (2012). "El asesinato de José Canalejas y su proyecto frustrado de nacionalización de la Monarquía" (PDF). Ámbitos. Revista de Estudios de Ciencias Sociales y Humanidades (in Spanish) (28). Córdoba: University of Córdoba: 79–86. ISSN 1575-2100.
- Martínez Relanzón, Alejandro (2017). "Political Modernization in Spain Between 1876 and 1923". Annales Universitatis Mariae Curie-Skłodowska, Sectio K. 24 (1). Madrid: Maria Curie-Skłodowska University: 145–154. doi:10.17951/k.2017.24.1.145. S2CID 159328027.
- Royal Academy of History (2022). "Historia Hispánica". Historia Hispánica (in Spanish).
- Serrano Lahoz, Manuel (2020). Los partidos republicanos durante la Restauración (1874-1931) (PDF) (BA thesis) (in Spanish). University of Zaragoza.
- Ruiz Franco, Rosario (2024). "Historia Contemporánea de España. Reinado de Alfonso XIII (1902-1923). El gobierno de Canalejas y el regeneracionismo liberal" (PDF) (in Spanish). Charles III University of Madrid.
