= Alliance of the Left =

Alliance of the Left Alianza de las Izquierdas
- Leader: Melquíades Álvarez; Álvaro de Albornoz
- Founded: 1918
- Dissolved: 1918
- Preceded by: Republican–Socialist Conjunction
- Succeeded by: Republican–Socialist Conjunction
- Ideology: Republicanism; Progressivism; Federalism; Radicalism; Socialism
- Political position: Centre-left to Left-wing

The Alliance of the Left (Spanish: Alianza de las Izquierdas, AI) was a Spanish electoral coalition created ahead of the 1918 general election.

== Background ==
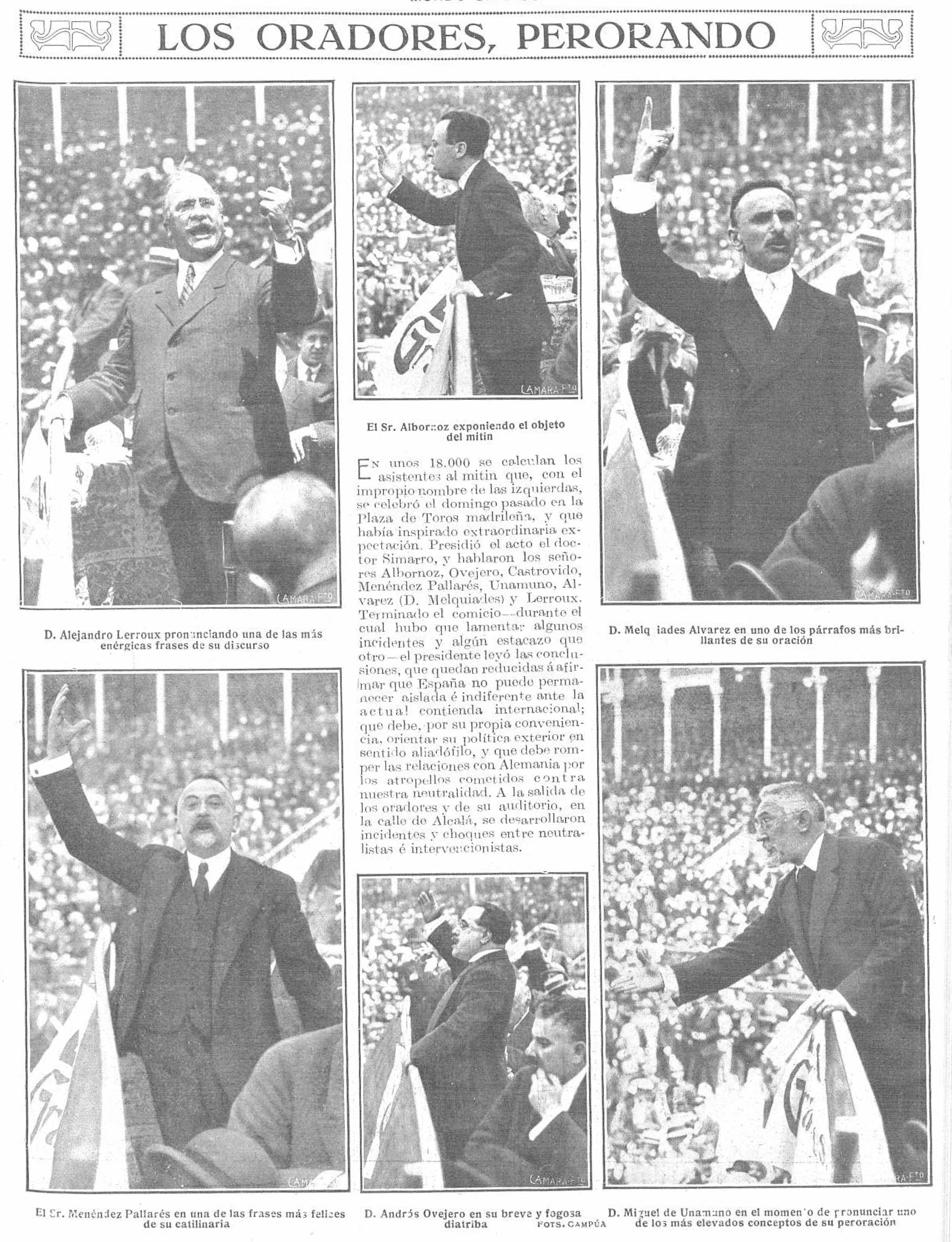
27 May meeting of the "aliadofilos", which would form the Alliance on 1918.

Its origins can be traced to an "aliadófilo" meeting organized by the different republican parties and the Anti-German League, with the ambiguous support of the PSOE, on 27 May.

The common opposition to the Central Powers as well as the aftermath of the Spanish crisis of 1917 made necessary in the eyes of the different leftist groups to create an electoral alliance under the common banner of fighting the current regime, which was considered to be irreparable and the main cause of Spain's decadence.

Nonetheless, the electoral results were disappointing for the parties involved, in total they only achieved 35 seats. The main beneficiaries of this alliance were the more radical republicans and socialists while moderates suffered a decrease in representation, with Álvarez and Lerroux losing their seats.

== Members ==
- Reformist Party (9 seats)
- Republican Federation (10 seats)
- Radical Republican Party (2 seats)
- Autonomist Republican Union Party (1 seat)
- Federal Democratic Republican Party (1 seat)
- Catalan Republican Party (4 seats)
- Spanish Socialist Workers' Party (6 seats)
- Independent catalan nationalists (2 seats)

== Bibliography ==
- Fuentes Codera, Maximiliano (2014). España en la Primera Guerra Mundial: Una movilización cultural. Akal. ISBN 978-84-4603-942-6.
- Serrano Lahoz, Manuel (2020). Los partidos republicanos durante la Restauración (1874-1931) (PDF) (BA thesis) (in Spanish). University of Zaragoza.
