= Republican–Socialist Conjunction =

Republican–Socialist Conjunction Conjunción Republicano–Socialista
- Leader: Benito Pérez Galdós (until 1913)
- Founded: 7 November 1909; March 1931
- Dissolved: December 1919; September 1933
- Ideology: Republicanism; Progressivism; Federalism; Radicalism; Socialism
- Political position: Centre-left to left-wing

The Republican–Socialist Conjunction (Spanish: Conjunción Republicano–Socialista, CRS) was a Spanish electoral coalition created in 1909 and lasting until 1919. It was formed in the aftermath of the Tragic Week and with the Liberal takeover of power leading to the breakdown of the "Left Bloc", seeing a number of anti-monarchist parties joining into the alliance ahead of incoming elections, including Pablo Iglesias Posse's Spanish Socialist Workers' Party (PSOE), Alejandro Lerroux's Radical Republican Party (PRR) and a faction within the Republican Union opposed to Nicolás Salmerón's decision to join Catalan Solidarity in 1907. It comprised different parties during its short lifespan, but it always included the PSOE and at least several republican members. It was disbanded in December 1919 after the PSOE left the alliance.

The coalition was revived in March 1931 ahead of the April municipal elections that led to the proclamation of the Second Spanish Republic, and was renewed for the 1931 general election. Bringing together the PSOE and the main republican parties stemming from the 1930 Pact of San Sebastián, it formed the parliamentary majority that backed the Provisional Government and Manuel Azaña's cabinets, before ultimately dissolving in September 1933 after the PSOE decided to end the alliance and run separately in the 1933 general election.

== Composition ==
Party	Notes
Spanish Socialist Workers' Party (PSOE)	
Radical Republican Party (PRR)	1909–12
Republican Union (UR)	1909–10
Republican Nationalist Federal Union (UFNR)	1911–12
Republican Party (PRep)	1913–17
Federal Republican Party (PRF)	1916–19
Autonomist Republican Union Party (PURA)	1916–19
Republican Federation (FR)	1917–19

== Electoral performance ==
=== Restoration Cortes ===
Election	Popular vote			Seats	Leader	Outcome
Election	Votes	%	#	Seats	Leader	Outcome
1910		10.3	#3	27 / 404	Benito Pérez Galdós	PL majority
1914			#8	10 / 408	Roberto Castrovido	PLC minority
1916			#4	13 / 409	Roberto Castrovido	PL–LD majority
1919			#6	15 / 409	Álvaro de Albornoz	PLC minority

== Bibliography ==
- Robles Egea, Antonio (1982). "Formación de la Conjunción Republicano-Socialista de 1909" (PDF). Revista de Estudios Políticos (in Spanish) (29). Madrid: Centre for Political and Constitutional Studies: 145–161.
- Serrano Lahoz, Manuel (2020). Los partidos republicanos durante la Restauración (1874-1931) (PDF) (BA thesis) (in Spanish). University of Zaragoza.
