= Maurist Party =

Maurist Party Partido Maurista
- Leader: Antonio Maura; Antonio Goicoechea
- Founded: 27 October 1913
- Dissolved: 1931
- Split from: Conservative Party
- Ideology: Maurism

The Maurist Party (Spanish: Partido Maurista, PM), also known as the Maurists (Spanish: Mauristas), was a political faction within the Liberal Conservative Party, led by Antonio Maura, which split from the party after Eduardo Dato's appointment as prime minister of Spain on 27 October 1913.

The party lost relevance after Miguel Primo de Rivera's coup d'état in 1923 and Maura's death in 1925, with Antonio Goicoechea being elected as new party leader. In early 1931, the Constitutional Centre party was founded by three leading maurists (Goicoechea, César Silió, and Maura's son Gabriel) after negotiations in late 1930 in order to establish a federation of right-wing forces between Catalan regionalists and maurists.

== Electoral performance ==
=== Restoration Cortes ===
Election	Seats	Leader
1914	22 / 408	Antonio Maura
1916	17 / 409	Antonio Maura
1918	31 / 409	Antonio Maura
1919	104 / 409	Antonio Maura
1920	24 / 409	Antonio Maura
1923	12 / 409	Antonio Maura

== Bibliography ==
- Soldevilla, Fernando (1914). El Año Político 1913 (in Spanish). Madrid: National Library of Spain.
- Soldevilla, Fernando (1927). El Año Político 1926 (in Spanish). Madrid: National Library of Spain.
- González, María Jesús (1987). "Un aspecto de la "revolución desde arriba": maurismo y acción social". Revista de la Facultad de Geografía e Historia. 1. Madrid: National University of Distance Education: 145–161. doi:10.5944/etfv.1.1988.2654.
- Gil Pecharromán, Julio (1993). "Notables en busca de masas: El conservadurismo en la crisis de la Restauración". Espacio, Tiempo y Forma. Serie V, Historia Contemporánea. 6. Madrid: National University of Distance Education: 233–266. doi:10.5944/etfv.6.1993.2855.
