= Reformist Party (Spain) =

Reformist Party Partido Reformista
- Leader: Melquíades Álvarez
- Founded: 1912
- Dissolved: 1924
- Headquarters: Madrid, Spain
- Ideology: Republicanism; Liberalism; Secularism
- Political position: Centre
- Colours: Red, Yellow and Murrey

The Reformist Party (Spanish: Partido Reformista), formally and less-commonly known as the Reformist Republican Party (Spanish: Partido Republicano Reformista) was a political party in early 20th-century Spain. It was founded in 1912 by Melquíades Álvarez, Gumersindo de Azcárate, and José Ortega y Gasset, and presented itself as representing a moderate, accidentalist and democratic republicanism. In the 1914 election, the party elected 11 members to the Congress of Deputies.

The party ceased to exist during the Second Spanish Republic, which began in 1931.

== Election results ==
Election	Number of Seats	+/–	Notes
Spanish general election, 1914	11 / 408	▲11	
Spanish general election, 1916	12 / 409	▲11	
Spanish general election, 1918	9 / 409	▼3	Part of the Alliance of the Left.
Spanish general election, 1919	6 / 409	▼3	
Spanish general election, 1920	9 / 437	▲3	
Spanish general election, 1923	18 / 437	▲9	Part of the Liberal Concentration.

== Bibliography ==
- Martínez Ruiz, Enrique; Maqueda Abreu, Consuelo; De Diego, Emilio (1999). Atlas histórico de España. El Reinado de Alfonso XIII (1902-1931) (in Spanish). Vol. 2. Bilbao: Ediciones KAL. pp. 121–132. ISBN 9788470903502.
- Suárez Cortina, Manuel (1994). "La quiebra del republicanismo histórico, 1898-1931". In Townson, Nigel (ed.). El republicanismo en España (1830-1977) (in Spanish). Alianza Editorial. pp. 139–164. ISBN 84-206-2778-X.
- Aubert, Paul (2008). "Intelectuales y obreros (1888–1936)". Cuadernos de Historia Contemporánea (in Spanish). 30: 127–154.
- Serrano Lahoz, Manuel (2020). Los partidos republicanos durante la Restauración (1874-1931) (PDF) (BA thesis) (in Spanish). University of Zaragoza.
