= Autonomist Monarchist Federation =

Autonomist Monarchist Federation Unión Monárquica Nacional
- Founded: 1918
- Dissolved: 1930
- Ideology: Monarchism; Liberalism; Regionalism

The Autonomist Monarchist Federation (Spanish: Federación Monárquica Autonomista, FMA) was a political party during the Spanish Restoration period, that existed between 1918 and 1930. It was founded in Catalonia in opposition to the National Monarchist Union.
