= Republican Coalition (Spain, 1914) =

Republican Coalition Coalición Republicana
- Founded: 1914
- Dissolved: 1917
- Ideology: Republicanism; Progressivism
- Political position: Centre-left to left-wing

The Republican Coalition (Spanish: Coalición Republicana, CR) was a Spanish electoral alliance created for the 1914 Spanish general election between the Radical Republican Party (PRR) and the Republican Nationalist Federal Union (UFNR). It would come to be known as the "Sant Gervasi Agreement" (Spanish: Pacto de Sant Gervasi).

== Composition ==
Party
Radical Republican Party (PRR)
Republican Nationalist Federal Union (UFNR)

== Bibliography ==
- Bonet Revés, Carles (2010). La España de los otros españoles (in Spanish). Barcelona: Planeta.
