= Nationalist Democratic Federation =

Nationalist Democratic Federation Federació Democràtica Nacionalista
- Leader: Francesc Macià
- Founded: 2 February 1919
- Dissolved: 1923
- Merged into: Estat Català
- Ideology: Catalan independence Progressivism

The Nationalist Democratic Federation (Catalan: Federació Democràtica Nacionalista, Spanish: Federación Democrática Nacionalista, FDN) was a Catalan political party during the Spanish Restoration period.

== History ==
It was founded by Francesc Macià in February 1919 and was the successor to the Catalan Nationalist Association (ANC). It was merged into Catalan State in 1923.
