= Aragonese Union (1917) =

Aragonese Union Unión Aragonesista
- Founded: 1917
- Dissolved: 1937
- Ideology: Aragonese nationalism

The Aragonese Union (Spanish: Unión Aragonesista, UA) was a political party during the Spanish Restoration period, that existed between 1917 and 1937. It was founded in Barcelona in December 1917 as the Aragonese Regionalist Union (Spanish: Unión Regionalista Aragonese, URA).
