= Albuñol =

- Municipality
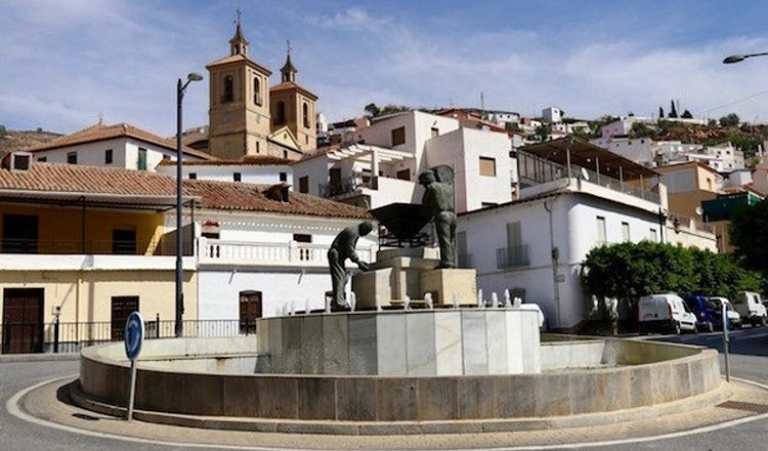

- Flag Coat of arms

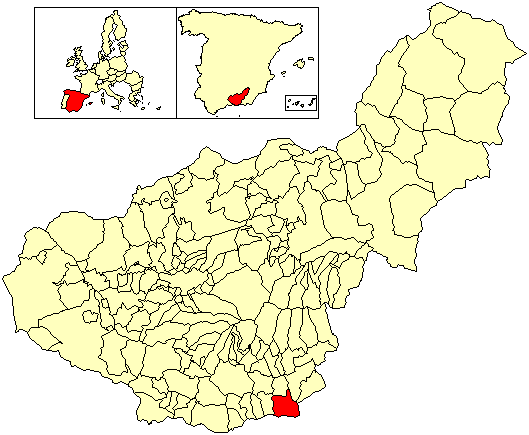

- Location in Spain
- Coordinates: 36°48′N 3°12′W
- Country: Spain
- Autonomous community: Andalusia
- Province: Granada
- Comarca: Costa Tropical
- Judicial district: Motril

Government
  - Alcaldesa: María José Sánchez Sánchez (2009) (PSOE)

Area
  - Total: 63 km^{2} (24 sq mi)
- Elevation: 250 m (820 ft)

Population (2025-01-01)
  - Total: 7,388
  - Density: 120/km^{2} (300/sq mi)
- Demonym: albuñolense/-a
- Time zone: UTC+1 (CET)
  - Summer (DST): UTC+2 (CEST)
- Postal code: 18700
- Dialing code: (+34) 958
- Official language(s): Spanish

Albuñol is a town in the province of Granada, Spain. Located a few miles inland, it is regarded as one of the gateways to the Alpujarras mountains. The municipality includes the small beach resort of La Rabita.

== Demography ==
According to the 2007 census, Albuñol had a population of 6,270 inhabitants.

== History ==
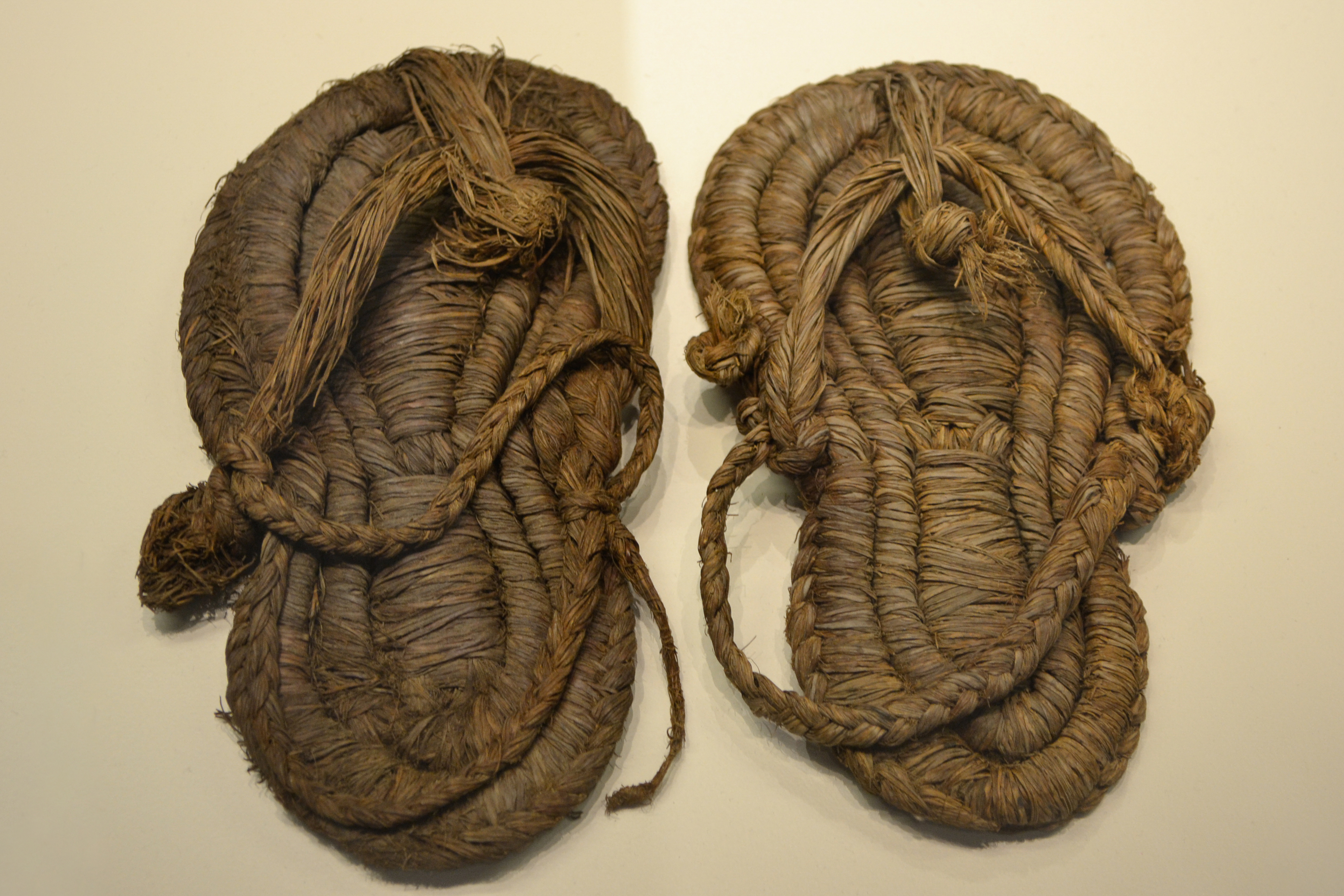
Ancient sandals from the Cave of Bats, now in the National Archaeological Museum

Remains have been found of a prehistoric settlement in the Cave of Bats, located in the municipality, but Albuñol itself is believed to be of Roman origin. The heyday of the Alpujarra was the Moors, at the time Albuñol contained the largest population of Great Cehel or Gran Costa. It was in these centuries Albuñol was defended by the castle of La Rábita. In the sixteenth century Portocarrero Luis Zapata bought the population to the Crown, Dona Juana, also receiving the award of city status. After the expulsion of the Moors in 1570 began the repopulation of the Alpujarra with Castile, Galicia and Leon, but Albuñol did not occur until the seventeenth century. In 1834 he became head of the judicial district of the same name, currently the headquarters is located in Motril.

== Festivities ==
Among the traditions of the town is very Arriagada craft activities in the area such as manufacturing esparto or other materials. It is also called the great tradition of winemaking in the area, unique for its taste and graduation. Among the monuments of the town, one of the fundamentals is the parish church which is dedicated to St Patrick. The building dates from the fifteenth century.

Despite being a small town, Albuñol has several festivities throughout the year. Patronal Feast of St. Patrick on March 17 held by the town's streets the procession of the patron of Albuñol along with San Jose. Fiesta de San Marcos April 25, protector of cattle. Summer Fair: the first weekend of August. Cattle Fair: from 30 October to 1 November. Castles In particular it celebrates its Patronal Fiesta in honor of San Pedro from 27 to 29 June. (La Rábita): Fiesta de San Isidro Labrador, May 15, Feast of San Juan which is held every June 23; Fiestas Patronal of Nuestra Señora La Virgen del Mar every September 8. In El Pozuelo, fiestas in honor of Santiago Apostle on 25 June. In 1986 was held in this population, the V Festival of Traditional Music of the Alpujarra.

== See also ==
- List of municipalities in Granada
