= National Monarchist Union (Spain, 1919) =

National Monarchist Union Unión Monárquica Nacional
- Founded: 1919
- Dissolved: 1931
- Ideology: Monarchism
- Political position: Right-wing

The National Monarchist Union (Spanish: Unión Monárquica Nacional, UMN) was a political alliance during the Spanish Restoration period, from 1919 and 1931. It was founded in Catalonia by supporters of Alfonso XIII's monarchy to try to counteract the political hegemony that the Regionalist League of Catalonia had at the time.
