= Liberal Left (Spain) =

Liberal Left Izquierda Liberal
- Leader: Santiago Alba
- Founded: November 1917/ Early 1918
- Dissolved: 1923
- Split from: Liberal Party
- Ideology: Liberalism; Monarchism
- Political position: Centre-left

The Liberal Left (Spanish: Izquierda Liberal, IL), formally the Monarchist Liberal Left (Spanish: Izquierda Liberal Monárquica), was a political party led by Santiago Alba which split from the Liberal Party between November 1917 and early 1918, following the crisis in the government of the Count of Romanones. As finance minister under Romanones, Alba had gained prominence by leading a liberal legislative programme of tax reforms, public investments, improvements in the Public Treasury administration and fighting tax fraud, but his agenda was blocked by the obstructionist and filibustering opposition from the Regionalist League under Francesc Cambó.

The party was disestablished in 1923 following Miguel Primo de Rivera's coup d'état.

== See also ==
- La Libertad (Spain)

== Bibliography ==
- Martorell Linares, Miguel Ángel (1997). "La crisis parlamentaria de 1913-1917. La quiebra del sistema de relaciones parlamentarias de la Restauración". Revista de Estudios Políticos (in Spanish) (96). Madrid: Centre for Political and Constitutional Studies: 137–161. ISSN 0048-7694. Archived from the original on 2022-12-06.
