= Incompatibility rule =

Incompatibility rule (also incompatibility of membership) is a regulation issued by a group of people (a government, political party, or other association) that prohibits simultaneous membership in this group and other groups (explicitly listed). Such conflicts usually represent an obstacle to admission to the group or a cause for expulsion. For example, the members of parliament in many countries are prohibited from engaging in certain occupations (civil servants, members of the Judiciary, executives of public corporations).

== Parliamentary incompatibility ==
Most countries impose some restrictions regarding outside occupations of the members of parliament (in 1976, the exceptions included many countries of the Soviet bloc, Liechtenstein, and Sweden). Some restrictions come in the form of ineligibility, disqualifying a candidate (for example, as defined by the Incompatibility Clause of the US Constitution or House of Commons Disqualification Act 1975 in the UK). In other cases, the candidate with a potential incompatibility is allowed to run in the election, yet in case of an electoral success has to make a choice between their occupation and membership.

The lists of occupations prohibited to parliamentarians vary by country, but frequently include:

- civil servants, usually defined as people appointed by the government or receiving public money (some states explicitly define the incompatible government jobs). Few countries, like Austria, Germany, France suspend the duties and benefits of public servants, so they are able to resume their original work after ending their parliament career;
- members of the Judiciary defined as either all persons in these occupations (France, Spain), or just the judges of high courts;
- executives of public corporations;
- members of the armed forces and police;
- public contractors;
- members of other deliberative assemblies. Most countries allow an exception for local governments, but some prohibit simultaneous membership in a State or provincial legislature (Australia, Brazil, Canada, India) or any local assembly (Belgium, Italy, Republic of Korea);
- holders of the ministerial office usually cannot combine these jobs with membership in parliament in the states with formal separation of powers and presidential systems, while parliamentary systems (except for France, Netherlands, and Sweden) generally do not consider this an incompatibility and even encourage the practice.

== Party membership ==
=== Germany ===
Germany has a long tradition of incompatibility resolutions (German: Unvereinbarkeitsbeschluss) issued by its parties: Communist Party of Germany (KPD) adopted an incompatibility resolution against the left-wing International Socialist Youth League (ISYL) already in 1922. ISYL members moved on to Social Democratic Party of Germany (SPD), and SPD followed with its own resolution in 1925. The compilation of these resolutions for a particular party is also known as an incompatibility list, German: Unvereinbarkeitsliste.

The Christian Democratic Union of Germany (CDU) officially maintains a stance of incompatibility regarding coalitions and similar forms of cooperation with both The Left and the Alternative for Germany (AfD) since 2018.

== Sources ==
- Herman, Valentine; Mendel, Françoise (1976-01-01). "Table 14. Incompatibility of Occupations and Professions with Membership of Parliament". Parliaments of the World: A Reference Compendium. De Gruyter. pp. 172–181. doi:10.1515/9783111691053.172. ISBN 978-3-11-169105-3.
- Herrmann, K.; Schwitzer, B. (2024). Der Geist der kritischen Schule: Kantisches Denken in der Tradition von Jakob Friedrich Fries und Leonard Nelson im 20. Jahrhundert: Wirkungen und Aktualität (in German). Springer Berlin Heidelberg. ISBN 978-3-662-68345-3.
- van der Hulst, M. (2000). "Parliamentary incompatibilities". The Parliamentary Mandate: A Global Comparative Study. [Studies on comparative parliamentary law. Inter-Parliamentary Union. pp. 44–51. ISBN 978-92-9142-056-8.
- Neef-Methfessel, Tobias (2021). "Der Sozialist und der Staatschutz: Politbiographische Skizze zu Karl Hofmann". Demokratie-Dialog: Werkstattbericht FoDEx (PDF). Göttingen: Göttingen University Press. pp. 2–12. doi:10.17875/gup2021-1768.
- Piccio, Daniela Romée (2012). Party Regulation in Europe: Country Reports (PDF). Working Paper No. 18. Legal Regulation of Political Parties.
