= Monarchist Coalition (Spain) =

Monarchist Coalition Coalición Monárquica
- Founded: 1910
- Dissolved: 1923
- Ideology: Monarchism

The Monarchist Coalition (Spanish: Coalición Monárquica, CM) was an electoral alliance in the constituency of Madrid during the Spanish Restoration period, formed ahead of the 1910 general election by parties supportive of Alfonso XIII's monarchy to try to counteract the growing presence of pro-republican parties.
