= Catalan Republican Party (1917) =

Catalan Republican Party Partit Republicà Català
- Leader: Francesc Layret; Lluís Companys
- Founded: 1917
- Dissolved: 1931
- Merger of: Autonomist Republican Bloc; Republican Nationalist Federal Union
- Merged into: ERC
- Ideology: Republicanism; Catalanism
- Political position: Left-wing

The Catalan Republican Party (Catalan: Partit Republicà Català, PRC) was a Catalanist political party during the Spanish Restoration period, that existed between 1917 and 1931 as a marger of the Autonomist Republican Bloc (BRA), the Republican Youth of Lleida (JRL) and remnants of the Republican Nationalist Federal Union (UFNR). In 1931, with the advent of the Second Spanish Republic, the party integrated itself within the newly founded Republican Left of Catalonia (ERC).

== Bibliography ==
- Serrano Lahoz, Manuel (2020). Los partidos republicanos durante la Restauración (1874-1931) (PDF) (BA thesis) (in Spanish). University of Zaragoza.
