= Ciervists =

Ciervists Ciervistas
- Leader: Juan de la Cierva y Peñafiel
- Founded: 1914
- Dissolved: 1931
- Split from: Conservative Party
- Ideology: Conservatism; Monarchism
- Political position: Right-wing

The Ciervists (Spanish: Ciervistas), also known as the Ciervist Conservatives (Spanish: Conservadores Ciervistas, CC), were a political faction within the Liberal Conservative Party, led by Juan de la Cierva y Peñafiel, which split from the party in 1914.

The party lost relevance after Miguel Primo de Rivera's coup in 1923, though Juan de la Cierva still held high-profile positions in the last monarchist government of Juan Bautista Aznar-Cabañas in 1931.
