= Liberal Democratic Party (Spain, 1913) =

Liberal political party in Restoration Spain

Liberal Democratic Party Partido Liberal Demócrata
- Leader: Manuel García Prieto; Eugenio Montero Ríos
- Founded: 24 June 1913
- Dissolved: 1923
- Split from: Liberal Party
- Ideology: Liberalism; Monarchism
- Political position: Centre to centre-left

The Liberal Democratic Party (Spanish: Partido Liberal Demócrata, PLD), also referred to as the Liberal Democrats (Spanish: Liberal Demócratas), was a political party led by Manuel García Prieto, Marquis of Alhucemas, who split from the Liberal Party in June 1913, shortly after the assassination of Prime Minister José Canalejas. The immediate causes of the split were the debate on the Law of Commonwealths—initiated under Canalejas and opposed by the then president of the Senate, Eugenio Montero Ríos—and the rivaly between Alhucemas and the Count of Romanones (who was the prime minister at the time) over the Liberal leadership. This clash would see the downfall of Romanones' government in October 1913 following its defeat in a vote of confidence in the Senate.

In the summer of 1915, Romanones and Alhucemas would temporarily ally against the Conservative government of Eduardo Dato, forming a joint government upon its downfall and running together in the 1916 general election.

The Liberal Democrats eventually went on to become the dominant liberal faction in the later stages of Restoration Spain.

The party was disestablished in 1923 following Miguel Primo de Rivera's coup d'état.

== Bibliography ==
- Soldevilla, Fernando (1914). El Año Político 1913 (in Spanish). Madrid: National Library of Spain.
- Martorell Linares, Miguel Ángel (1997). "La crisis parlamentaria de 1913-1917. La quiebra del sistema de relaciones parlamentarias de la Restauración". Revista de Estudios Políticos (in Spanish) (96). Madrid: Centre for Political and Constitutional Studies: 137–161. ISSN 0048-7694. Archived from the original on 2022-12-06.
