= Autonomist Republican Union Party =

Autonomist Republican Union Party Partido de Unión Republicana Autonomista
- Leader: Vicente Blasco Ibáñez
- Founded: 1908
- Dissolved: 1936
- Preceded by: Republican Union
- Ideology: Republicanism; Blasquism
- Political position: Centre-left (1908-1931); Centre-right (1931-1936)

The Autonomist Republican Union Party (Spanish: Partido de Unión Republicana Autonomista, PURA) was a Spanish republican party based in Valencia and founded in 1908 by Vicente Blasco Ibáñez.
