= Results of the 1923 Spanish general election =

This is a list of constituency results for the 1923 Spanish general election.

== Competing Parties ==
=== National parties ===
Affiliation	Party	Leader
Liberal Concentration	Liberal Democratic Party	Manuel García Prieto
Liberal Concentration	Romanonists	Álvaro de Figueroa
Liberal Concentration	Liberal Left	Santiago Alba y Bonifaz
Liberal Concentration	Reformist Party	Melquíades Álvarez
Liberal Concentration	Agrarian Liberal Party	Rafael Gasset Chinchilla
Liberal Concentration	Zamorists/Independent Democratic Party	Niceto Alcalá-Zamora
Liberal Concentration	Other liberals	
Conservatives	Liberal Conservative Party	José Sánchez-Guerra
Conservatives	Maurist Party	Antonio Maura
Conservatives	Ciervist Conservatives	Juan de la Cierva
Conservatives	Agrarian Conservative Party	Abilio Calderón Rojo
Regionalist League of Catalonia		Francesc Cambó
Republicans	Radical Republican Party/Republican Democracy	Alejandro Lerroux
Republicans	Catalan Republican Party	Marcelino Domingo
Republicans	Federal Democratic Republican Party	Eduardo Barriobero
Republicans	Nationalist Republican Party	Pau Robert i Rabadà
Republicans	Other Republicans	
Spanish Socialist Workers' Party		Pablo Iglesias Posse
Carlists	Independent Tradicionalists	Jaime III and José Selva Mergelina
Carlists	Traditionalist Catholic Party	Juán Vázquez de Mella
Carlists	Integrist Party	Juan de Olazábal
Basque Nationalist Communion		Ignacio de Rotaeche
Catalan Action		Antoni Rovira
Autonomist Monarchist Federation		Joaquín María de Nadal
Estat Català		Francesc Macià
Aragonese Union		José María Mur
Urquijists		Luis Cayetano de Urquijo
Communist Party of Spain		Antonio García Quejido
Catholics
Agrarians
Others and independents

=== Regional Coalitions ===
Coalition	Parties	Province
Monarchist Action League	PLC, Lib, PSOE (Note: The PSOE wasn't part of the League, they made a deal in which the PSOE candidate for Vizcaya wouldn't be challenged by the League and vice versa)	Vizcaya
Foral Alliance	CT, PNV, PM (Note: The Maurists weren't part of the Foral Alliance, but they reached a deal in Pamplona to get its support for its candidate)	Navarre
National Monarchist Union	PLC, Lib	Gerona, Lérida and Barcelona
Monarchist-Mercantile Coalition	PLC, Lib, Ref	Madrid

=== Abstentionists ===
Group	Abstention since
Traditionalist Communion	1923
Popular Social Party	1922
National Confederation of Labor	1910
Aberri	1921

== La Coruña (14 seats) ==
Competing parties	Seats		
Competing parties	A.29	Cont.	Total
Liberal Democratic Party	4	2	6
Agrarian Liberal Party	0	4	4
Liberal Conservative Party	3	0	3
Maurist Party	1	0	1
Ciervist Conservatives	0	0	0
Independents	0	0	0
Total	8	6	14

=== Santa Marta de Ortigueira ===
Party	Candidate	Votes
Liberal Democrat	Carlos Albert Despujols	Article 29
Liberal Democrat hold

=== Ferrol ===
Party	Candidate	Votes
Liberal Democrat	Ángel García Valerio	Article 29
Liberal Democrat hold

=== Puentedeume ===
Party	Candidate	Votes
Conservative	Julio Wais y San Martín	Article 29
Conservative hold

=== Betanzos ===
Party	Candidate	Votes
Liberal Democrat	José Sánchez Anido	Article 29
Liberal Democrat gain from Conservative

=== La Coruña, Multi-member district (3 seats) ===
Party	Candidate	Votes
Liberal Democrat	Alfonso Gullón y García Prieto	Article 29
Maurist	Juan Armada Losada	Article 29
Conservative	José del Moral Sanjurjo	Article 29
Liberal Democrat hold
Maurist hold
Conservative hold

=== Corcubión ===
Party	Candidate	Votes
Conservative	Benito Blanco Rajoy y Espada	Article 29
Conservative hold

=== Muros ===
Annulled election
Party	Candidate	Votes
Liberal Democrat	José Reino Caamaño	Won
Conservative	José María Paramés Barrios	
Liberal Democrat gain from Conservative

=== Santiago de Compostela ===
Party	Candidate	Votes
Liberal Democrat	Vicente Calderón y Montero Ríos	Won
Conservative	Juan Moreno Tilve	
Liberal Democrat gain from Conservative

=== Santa María de Órdenes ===
Party	Candidate	Votes
Agrarian Liberal	Alfonso Senra Bernárdez	Won
¿?		
Agrarian Liberal hold

=== Noia ===
Party	Candidate	Votes
Agrarian Liberal	Ricardo Gasset Alzugaray	Won
Maurist	José Calvo Sotelo	
Agrarian Liberal hold

=== Padrón ===
Party	Candidate	Votes
Agrarian Liberal	Antonio Rodríguez Pérez	Won
Independent	Luis Suárez González Pumariega	(Note: Sought his proclamation as candidate to prevent the use of Article 29 in this district. After achieving this, he retired from the race.)
Agrarian Liberal hold

=== Arzúa ===
Party	Candidate	Votes
Agrarian Liberal	Generoso Martín-Toledano y Fernández	Won
Ciervist	Eduardo O'Shea Verdes Montenegro	
Agrarian Liberal gain from Ciervist

== Pontevedra (11 seats) ==
Party	Seats		
Party	A.29	Cont.	Total
Conservative Party	3	2	5
Liberal Democratic Party	2	1	3
Agrarian Liberal Party	0	1	1
Romanonists	0	1	1
Reformist Party	1	0	1
Agrarians	0	0	0
Communist Party of Spain	0	0	0
Independents	0	0	0
Total	6	5	11

=== La Estrada ===
Party	Candidate	Votes
Liberal Democrat	Vicente Riestra Calderón	Won
Agrarian	Alfredo Pérez Viondi	
Liberal Democrat hold

=== Caldas de Reyes ===
Party	Candidate	Votes
Liberal Democrat	Bernardo Mateo-Sagasta y Echeverría	Article 29
Liberal Democrat hold

=== Cambados ===
Party	Candidate	Votes
Conservative	Wenceslao González Garra	Article 29
Conservative hold

=== Puente Caldelas ===
Party	Candidate	Votes
Conservative	Raimundo Fernández-Villaverde y Roca de Togores	Won
Agrarian	Manuel Portela Valladares	
Conservative hold

=== Lalín ===
Party	Candidate	Votes
Liberal Democrat	Manuel Sáinz de Vicuña y Camino	Article 29
Liberal Democrat hold

=== Pontevedra ===
Party	Candidate	Votes
Romanonist	Eduardo Vicenti Reguera	Won
Agrarian	Sr. Iglesias	
Communist	Juan Andrade Rodríguez	
Romanonist hold

=== Vigo ===
Party	Candidate	Votes
Agrarian Liberal	Rafael Gasset Chinchilla	Won
Defenders' League	Adolfo Gregorio Espino	
Agrarian Liberal gain from Romanonist

=== Redondela ===
Party	Candidate	Votes
Reformist	Luis Zulueta Escolano	Article 29
Reformist gain from Conservative

=== La Cañiza ===
Party	Candidate	Votes
Conservative	Alejandro Mon Landa	Article 29
Agrarian	Manuel Picouto	(Note: Although he was nominated, his candidacy was not accepted by the Electoral Board)
Conservative hold

=== Tuy ===
Party	Candidate	Votes
Conservative	Mariano Ordoñez y García	Won
Agrarian	Manuel Portela Valladares	
Conservative hold

=== Puenteareas ===
Party	Candidate	Votes
Conservative	Manuel Fernández Barrón	Article 29
Conservative hold

== Lugo (11 seats) ==
Competing parties	Seats		
Competing parties	A.29	Cont.	Total
Romanonists	3	0	3
Liberal Conservative Party	1	2	3
Liberal Democratic Party	2	0	2
Liberal Left	0	1	1
Independents	1	0	1
Ciervist Conservatives	0	0	0
Total	7	3	10 (Note: The election in Mondoñedo was annulled)

=== Vivero ===
Party	Candidate	Votes
Liberal Left	José Soto Reguera	Won
¿?		
Liberal Left hold

=== Mondoñedo ===
Annulled election
Party	Candidate	Votes
Ciervist	Felipe Lazcano y Morales de Setién	Won
Liberal Democrat	Enrique Álvarez Neira	
Left vacant. Previously held by a Ciervist

=== Ribadeo ===
Party	Candidate	Votes
Romanonist	Ramón Bustelo González	Article 29
Romanonist hold

=== Lugo, multi-member district (3 seats) ===
Party	Candidate	Votes
Romanonist	Gerardo Doval y Rodríguez Formoso	Article 29
Independent Liberal	Joaquín Quiroga Espín	Article 29
Conservative	Luis Rodríguez de Viguri	Article 29
Romanonist gain from Conservative
Independent Liberal hold
Conservative hold

=== Fonsagrada ===
Party	Candidate	Votes
Liberal Democrat	Manuel Portela Valladares	Article 29
Liberal Democrat hold

=== Becerreá ===
Party	Candidate	Votes
Conservative	Joaquín Caro y del Arroyo	Won
¿?		
Conservative hold

=== Chantada ===
Party	Candidate	Votes
Liberal Democrat	Carlos Casas Couto	Article 29
Liberal Democrat gain from Romanonist

=== Monforte ===
Party	Candidate	Votes
Conservative	Carlos González Besada y Giráldez	Won
¿?		
Conservative hold

=== Quiroga ===
Party	Candidate	Votes
Romanonist	José Lladó Vallés	Article 29
Romanonist hold

== Orense (9 seats) ==
Competing parties	Seats		
Competing parties	A.29	Cont.	Total
Liberal Conservative Party	1	5	6
Liberal Democratic Party	0	1	1
Maurist Party	0	1	1
Agrarians	0	0	0
Independents	0	0	0
Total	1	7	8 (Note: The election in celanova was annulled)

=== Carballino ===
Party	Candidate	Votes
Conservative	Leopoldo García Durán	3.889
Agrarian	Alfredo García Ramos	2.595
Conservative hold

=== Ribadavia ===
Party	Candidate	Votes
Conservative	José Estévez Carrera	4.951
Agrarian	Adolfo Merelles Martel	2.629
Conservative hold

=== Orense ===
Party	Candidate	Votes
Conservative	Antonio Taboada Tundidor	3.443
Independent	Fernando Ramos	1.996
Agrarian	Basilio Álvarez Rodríguez	929
Conservative hold

=== Puebla de Trives ===
Party	Candidate	Votes
Maurist	Prudencio Rovira Pita	4.400
Agrarian	Juan Amoedo Seoane	3.339
Maurist hold

=== Valdeorras ===
Party	Candidate	Votes
Liberal Democrat	Francisco Barber Sánchez	4.856
Agrarian	Carlos Brasa	1.134
Liberal Democrat hold

=== Celanova ===
Annulled election
Party	Candidate	Votes
Conservative	Roberto Pardo Ocampo	Won
Agrarian	Manuel Lezón Fernández	
Conservative hold

=== Bande ===
Party	Candidate	Votes
Conservative	Gabino Bugallal Araújo	5.054
Independent	Lisardo González	2
Conservative hold

=== Ginzo de Limia ===
Party	Candidate	Votes
Conservative	Luis Usera Bugallal	5.402
Agrarian	Vicente Sagarriga y Martínez de Pisón	1.987
Liberal	Juan José Cobián	5
Others		2
Conservative hold

=== Verín ===
Party	Candidate	Votes
Conservative	Luis Espada Guntín	Article 29
Conservative hold

== Oviedo (14 seats) ==
Competing parties	Seats		
Competing parties	A.29	Cont.	Total
Reformist Party	5	2	7
Liberal Conservative Party	2	1	3
Liberal Democratic Party	2	0	2
Spanish Socialist Workers' Party	0	1	1
Independents	0	1	1
Federal Democratic Republican Party	0	0	0
Communist Party of Spain	0	0	0
Total	9	5	14

=== Castropol ===
Party	Candidate	Votes
Reformist	Melquiades Álvarez y González-Posada	Article 29
Reformist hold

=== Luarca ===
Party	Candidate	Votes
Liberal Democrat	Victoriano García San Miguel y Tamargo	Article 29
Liberal Democrat hold

=== Pravia ===
Party	Candidate	Votes
Reformist	Alfredo Martínez y García-Argüelles	Article 29
Reformist gain from Conservative

=== Avilés ===
Party	Candidate	Votes
Reformist	José Manuel Pedregal y Sánchez-Calvo	Article 29
Reformist hold

=== Gijón ===
Party	Candidate	Votes
Reformist	Francisco de Orueta y Estébanez-Calderón	5.116
Federal republican	Eduardo Barriobero y Herrán	3.586
Reformist hold

=== Villaviciosa ===
Party	Candidate	Votes
Conservative	Nicanor de las Alas Pumariño y Troncoso	Article 29
Conservative hold

=== Llanes ===
Party	Candidate	Votes
Reformist	Amadeo Álvarez García	Article 29
Reformist gain from Liberal

=== Tineo ===
Party	Candidate	Votes
Conservative	Salvador Bermúdez de Castro y O'Lawlor	1.576
Independent	Antonio Camacho Pichardo	15
Conservative hold

=== Cangas de Tineo ===
Party	Candidate	Votes
Reformist	Leopoldo Palacios Morini	Article 29
Reformist gain from Conservative

=== Belmonte ===
Party	Candidate	Votes
Liberal Democrat	Juan Uría Uría	Article 29
Liberal Democrat gain from Conservative

=== Oviedo, multi-member constituency (3 seats) ===
Party	Candidate	Votes
Liberal Union	Ramón Álvarez-Valdés y Castañón, Reformist	16.327
Liberal Union	Ignacio Herrero de Collantes, Independent	13.828
Socialists	Manuel Llaneza Zapico	7.106
Socialists	Teodomiro Menéndez	6.765
Communists	José María Viñuela	978
Communists	Eduardo Torralva	288
Liberal Union hold
Socialist hold

=== Infiesto ===
Party	Candidate	Votes
Conservative	Manuel de Argüelles Argüelles	Article 29
Conservative hold

== Vizcaya (6 seats) ==
Competing parties	Seats		
Competing parties	A.29	Cont.	Total
Monarchist Action League	0	5	5 (Note: 2 Conservative, 1 Liberal Left, 1 Liberal and 1 independent monarchist)
Spanish Socialist Workers' Party	1	0	1
Basque Nationalist Communion	0	0	0
Independents	0	0	0
Total	1	5	6

=== Baracaldo ===
Party	Candidate	Votes
League	José Luis Goyoaga Escario, Conservative	6.548
Nationalist	Mariano de la Torre y Carricarte	5.322
League hold

=== Bilbao ===
Party	Candidate	Votes
Socialist	Indalecio Prieto Tuero	Article 29
Socialist hold

=== Guernica ===
Party	Candidate	Votes
League	Venancio de Nardiz y Alegría, Conservative	4.181
Anti-League	Tomás Elorrieta y Artaza, liberal	2.949
League hold

=== Valmaseda ===
Party	Candidate	Votes
League	Gregorio Balparda de las Herrerías, Liberal Left	6.679
Anti-League	Buylla	3.486
League hold

=== Marquina ===
Party	Candidate	Votes
League	Julio Francisco Domingo de Arteche y Villabaso, liberal	3.447
Nationalist	Ramón de la Sota y Aburto	1.974
League hold

=== Durango ===
Party	Candidate	Votes
League	Víctor Chávarri y Anduiza	2.870
Nationalist	Teodoro de Arozena y Muñuzuri	2.216
League hold

== Guipúzcoa (5 seats) ==
Competing parties	Seats		
Competing parties	A.29	Cont.	Total
Liberal Conservative Party	0	1	1
Maurist Party	0	1	1
Traditionalist Catholic Party	0	1	1
Integrist Party	1	0	1
Independents	0	1	1
Liberal Party (non-factional)	0	0	0
Spanish Socialist Workers' Party	0	0	0
Total	1	4	5

=== Zumaya ===
Party	Candidate	Votes
Maurist	Alfonso de Churruca y Calbetón	2.611
Independent	Eizaguirre	195
Maurist hold

=== San Sebastián ===
Party	Candidate	Votes
Conservative	León Lizariturry Martínez	7.227
Socialist	Pablo Iglesias Posse	837
Liberal	Mariano Zuáznabar	616
Conservative hold

=== Azpeitia ===
Party	Candidate	Votes
Integrist	Manuel Senante Martínez	Article 29
Integrist hold

=== Tolosa ===
Party	Candidate	Votes
Traditionalist Catholic (Note: He was also a member of the Popular Social Party)	Ricardo Oreja Elósegui	2.084
Independent	Eizaguirre	13
Traditionalist Catholic hold

=== Vergara ===
Party	Candidate	Votes
Gunsmith Candidature (Note: Supported by PNV)	Juan Urízar Eguiazu	5.699
Independent Monarchist (Note: Supported by CT)	Manfredo de Borbón y Bernaldo de Quirós	1.860
Others		2
Gunsmith gain from Independent Monarchist

== Álava (3 seats) ==
Competing parties	Seats		
Competing parties	A.29	Cont.	Total
Urquijists	0	2	2
Liberal Democratic Party	0	1	1
Liberal Conservative Party	0	0	0
Republicans (no party affiliation)	0	0	0
Basque Nationalist Communion	0	0	0
Total	0	3	3

=== Amurrio ===
Party	Candidate	Votes
Urquijist	Valentín Ruíz Senén	1.892
Nationalist	Esteban de Isusi y Carredano	67
Urquijist hold

=== Vitoria ===
Party	Candidate	Votes
Urquijist	Luis Cayetano de Urquijo y Ussía	6.548
Conservative	Guillermo Elio y Molinuevo	1.523
Republican	Ramón de Aldasoro	203
Urquijist gain from Conservative

=== Laguardia ===
Party	Candidate	Votes
Liberal Democrat	Enrique Ocio y López de Haro	Won
¿?	Joaquín Pérez de Agote	
Liberal Democrat hold

== Navarre (7 seats) ==
Competing parties	Seats		
Competing parties	A.29	Cont.	Total
Foral Alliance	0	3	3
Liberal Conservative Party	1	1	2
Liberal Party (non-factional)	0	1	1
Catholic	0	1	1
Total	1	6	7

=== Pamplona, multi-member district (3 seats) ===
Party	Candidate	Votes
Foral Alliance	Joaquín Baleztena Azcárate, Independent Traditionalist	7.498
Foral Alliance	Manuel Aranzadi Irujo, Nationalist	7.422
Foral Alliance	Félix Amorena Martínez, Maurist (Note: The Maurists weren't part of the Foral Alliance, but presented Amorena with their consent and endorsement.)	6.120
Liberal	Joaquín Viñas	2.973
Conservative	Gerardo Valcarlos	2.972
Foral Alliance hold

=== Aoiz ===
Party	Candidate	Votes
Conservative	Cándido Barricart Erdozain	Article 29
Conservative hold

=== Estella ===
Party	Candidate	Votes
Liberal	Manuel Gómez-Acebo y Modet	4.676
Foral Alliance	Gabino Martínez	3.789
Liberal gain from Carlist

=== Tafalla ===
Party	Candidate	Votes
Catholic	Justo Garrán Moso	5.594
Liberal	Pedro Arza	3.525
Conservative	Conde del Vado	555
Independent Traditionalist	Esteban Martínez Velez	Retired (Note: He supported Garrán)
Catholic gain from Conservative

=== Tudela ===
Party	Candidate	Votes
Conservative	José María Méndez de Vigo	6.033
Liberal	José María Ligués	5.180
Conservative hold

== Huesca (7 seats) ==
Competing parties	Seats		
Competing parties	A.29	Cont.	Total
Liberal Democratic Party	0	2	2
Liberal Conservative Party	2	0	2
Romanonists	0	1	1
Aragonese Union	0	1	1
Independents	0	1	1
Agrarians	0	0	0
Radical Republican Party	0	0	0
Republicans (Non-party affiliation)	0	0	0
Total	2	5	7

=== Jaca ===
Party	Candidate	Votes
Conservative	Rafael Sánchez Guerra Sainz	Article 29
Conservative hold

=== Boltaña ===
Party	Candidate	Votes
Aragonesist	Francisco Bastos Ansart	3.948
Republican	Celso Joaquinet	
Aragonesist hold

=== Benabarre ===
Party	Candidate	Votes
Conservative	Pío Vicente de Piniés Bayona	Article 29
Conservative hold

=== Huesca ===
Party	Candidate	Votes
Independent Liberal	Miguel Moya y Gastón de Iriarte	4.621
Radical Republican (Note: Supported by the Agrarians)		
Independent Liberal hold

=== Barbastro ===
Party	Candidate	Votes
Romanonist	Eduardo de Figueroa y Alonso-Martínez	4.297
Agrarian	Francisco Laguna	
Independent Liberal	Luis Amat	
Romanonist hold

=== Sariñena ===
Party	Candidate	Votes
Liberal Democrat	Juan Alvarado y del Saz	4.561
Agrarian	José María España Sirat	3.711
Liberal Democrat hold

=== Fraga ===
Party	Candidate	Votes
Liberal Democrat	Álvaro Muñoz Rocatallada	3.466
Agrarian	Vicente Palacio Cambra	
Liberal Democrat gain from Conservative

== Zaragoza (10 seats) ==
Competing parties	Seats		
Competing parties	A.29	Cont.	Total
Liberal Left	1	2	3
Liberal Conservative Party	0	2	2
Republicans (Non-party affiliation)	1	1	2
Liberal Democratic Party	0	1	1
Romanonists	1	0	1
Agrarian Liberal Party	0	1	1
Total	3	7	10

=== Ejea de los Caballeros ===
Party	Candidate	Votes
Liberal Left	José Gascón y Marín	Article 29
Liberal Left hold

=== Tarazona ===
Party	Candidate	Votes
Liberal Democrat	Carlos Corsini Senespleda	5.628
¿?		
Liberal Democrat hold

=== Calatayud ===
Party	Candidate	Votes
Republican	Darío Pérez García	Article 29
Republican hold

=== La Almunia ===
Party	Candidate	Votes
Conservative	Nicolás García Fando	3.620
¿?		
Conservative gain from Maurist

=== Zaragoza, multi-member constituency (3 seats) ===
Party	Candidate	Votes
Liberal Left	José Valenzuela de la Rosa	7.878
Conservative	Tomás Castellano Echenique	7.039
Republican	Mariano Tejero Manero	6.517
¿?		
Liberal Left gain from Independent
Conservative hold
Republican hold

=== Belchite ===
Party	Candidate	Votes
Romanonist	Leopoldo Romeo y Sanz	Article 29
Romanonist hold

=== Caspe ===
Party	Candidate	Votes
Agrarian Liberal	Rafael Bosque Albiac	3.989
¿?		
Agrarian Liberal gain from Maurist

=== Daroca ===
Party	Candidate	Votes
Liberal Left	José Valenzuela Soler	4.517
¿?		
Liberal Left gain from Independent Conservative

== Teruel (6 seats) ==
Competing parties	Seats		
Competing parties	A.29	Cont.	Total
Romanonists	0	2	2
Liberal Conservative Party	1	1	2
Liberal Democratic Party	1	0	1
Liberal Left	0	1	1
Total	2	4	6

=== Montalbán ===
Party	Candidate	Votes
Conservative	Carlos Castel y González	Article 29
Conservative hold

=== Alcañiz ===
Party	Candidate	Votes
Conservative	Francisco Javier Cervantes y Sanz de Andino	Won
¿?	Rafael Barón y Martínez Agullo	
Conservative hold

=== Valderrobres ===
Party	Candidate	Votes
Ramonanonist	Carlos Emilio Montañés y Criquillón	Won
¿?		
Ramonanonist hold

=== Albarracín ===
Party	Candidate	Votes
Liberal Democrat	Fernando Ruano Prieto	Article 29
Liberal Democrat gain from Conservative

=== Teruel ===
Party	Candidate	Votes
Romanonist	Alfonso Torán de la Rad	3.329
Conservative	José Falcó y Álvarez de Toledo	3.248
Ramonanonist gain from Conservative

=== Mora de Rubielos ===
Party	Candidate	Votes
Liberal Left	Francisco Javier Jiménez de la Puente	Won
¿?		
Liberal Left gain from Conservative

== Lérida (8 seats) ==
Competing parties	Seats		
Competing parties	A.29	Cont.	Total
National Monarchist Union	2	1	3 (Note: All from the Liberal Left)
Regionalist League	0	2	2
Reformist Party	0	1	1
Estat Català	0	1	1
Independents	0	1	1
Romanonists	0	0	0
Total	4	4	8

=== Sort ===
Party	Candidate	Votes
Monarchist	Emili Río i Periquet, Liberal Left	Article 29
Monarchist hold

=== Seo de Urgell ===
Party	Candidate	Votes
Monarchist	Joan Sarradell i Farràs, Liberal Left	3.828
Regionalist	Santiago Estapé y Labrador	29
Others		558
Monarchist hold

=== Solsona ===
Party	Candidate	Votes
Regionalist	Eduard Aunós Pérez	4.461
Independent	Antoni Gabarró i Torres	3.054
Regionalist hold

=== Tremp ===
Party	Candidate	Votes
Monarchist	Daniel Río i Periquet, Liberal Left	Article 29
Monarchist hold

=== Balaguer ===
Party	Candidate	Votes
Independent Regionalist	Felip Rodés y Baldrich	Article 29
Independent Regionalist hold

=== Lérida ===
Supreme Court Ruling (Note: On June 7, 1923, a Supreme Court report was approved annulling the proclamation made by the Scrutiny Board in favor of Florensa, proclaiming Dualde lawmaker for Lérida.)
Party	Candidate	Votes
Leridan Action	Manuel Florensa i Farré	4.734
Reformist	Joaquim Dualde i Gómez	4.686
Reformist gain from Conservative

=== Cervera ===
Election annulled
Party	Candidate	Votes
Regionalist	Josep Matheu i Ferrer	4.720
Romanonist	José Alonso Martínez Beá	3.124
Left vacant. Previously held by a Conservative

=== Borjas Blancas ===
Party	Candidate	Votes
Estat Català	Francesc Macià i Llussa	Article 29
Estat Català hold

== Gerona (8 seats) ==
Competing parties	Seats		
Competing parties	A.29	Cont.	Total
Regionalist League	1	2	3
National Monarchist Union	0	2	2 (Note: 1 Liberal Left and 1 Conservative)
Reformist Party	0	1	1
Catalan Republican Party	0	1	1
Independents	0	1	1
Federal Democratic Republican Party	0	0	0
Total	1	7	8

=== Puigcerdá ===
Party	Candidate	Votes
Reformist	Joan Dagas i Puigbó	3.889
Regionalist	Eusebi Bertrand i Serra	3.787
Others		31
Reformist gain from Regionalist

=== Torroella de Montgrí ===
Party	Candidate	Votes
Monarchist	Juli Fournier i Cuadros, Conservative	4.349
Regionalist	Lluís Puig de la Bellacasa i Déu	4.268
Others		8
Monarchist hold

=== Vilademuls ===
Party	Candidate	Votes
Regionalist	Narcís Pla i Carreras	4.028
Monarchist	Dàrius Romeu i Freixa	730
Others		29
Regionalist gain from Monarchist

=== Olot ===
Party	Candidate	Votes
Regionalist	Ignacio de Ventós i Mir	3.537
Monarchist	Adolf Puig i Ravenga	1.683
Regionalist gain from Monarchist

=== Figueras ===
Party	Candidate	Votes
Monarchist	Manuel Rius i Rius, Liberal Left	3.476
Catalan Republican	Albert Quintana i de León	3.069
Others		6
Monarchist gain from Federal Republican

=== La Bisbal ===
Party	Candidate	Votes
Catalan Republican	Salvador Albert i Pey	5.364
Monarchist	José Segura y Solsona, Liberal Left	3.906
Others		2
Catalan Republican hold

=== Gerona ===
Party	Candidate	Votes
Independent Regionalist	Narcís Pla i Deniel	4.361
Reformist	Joan Lladó i Vallès	2.772
Federal Republican	Ramon Noguer i Comet	Retired
Independent Regionalist hold

=== Santa Coloma de Farners ===
Party	Candidate	Votes
Regionalist	Joan Ventosa i Calvell	Article 29
Regionalist hold

== Barcelona (20 seats) ==
Competing parties	Seats		
Competing parties	A.29	Cont.	Total
Regionalist League	0	11	11
National Monarchist Union	0	2	2 (Note: 1 liberal democrat and 1 independent monarchist)
Radical Republican Party	0	2	2
Catalan Republican Party	0	1	1
Traditionalist independents	0	1	1
Republican (non-party affiliation)	0	1	1
Autonomist Monarchist Federation	0	1	1
Independents	0	1	1
Reformist Party	0	0	0
Spanish Socialist Workers' Party	0	0	0
Catalan Action	0	0	0
Liberal Party (non-factional)	0	0	0
Communist Party of Spain	0	0	0
Total	0	20	20

=== Berga ===
Party	Candidate	Votes
Monarchist	Joan Palá i Claret, Liberal Democrat	4.457
Regionalist	José Vidal Tarragó	3.565
Others		25
Monarchist hold

=== Vich ===
Party	Candidate	Votes
Regionalist	Albert Rusinyol i Prats	4.731
Independent Traditionalist	Bartomeu Trias i Comas	Retired
Independent Regionalist	Ramón Vilaplana y Forcada	Retired
Others		439
Regionalist gain from Independent Regionalist

=== Igualada ===
Party	Candidate	Votes
Monarchist	Manuel María Girona y Fernández Maqueira	5.278
Independent	Adolf Ruiz Casamitjana	4.755
Monarchist hold

=== Manresa ===
Party	Candidate	Votes
Regionalist	José Creixell e Iglesias	8.375
¿?		Retired
Regionalist hold

=== Castelltensol ===
Party	Candidate	Votes
Regionalist	Ramón Albó y Martí	5.137
Monarchist	Miquel Salellas y Ferrer	Retired
Regionalist hold

=== Villafranca ===
Party	Candidate	Votes
Regionalist	Enrique Rafols Martí	3.527
Reformist	José Zulueta y Gomis	2.829
Republican	Joan Casanovas i Maristany	1.744
Regionalist gain from Reformist

=== Tarrasa ===
Party	Candidate	Votes
Republican	Domingo Palet y Barba	4.339
Monarchist	Juan Marcet Palet	3.827
Republican gain from Monarchist

=== Granollers ===
Party	Candidate	Votes
Regionalist	José María Trías de Bes	5.896
Monarchist	Francisco Torras Villa, Liberal Left	5.577
Regionalist gain from Monarchist

=== Sabadell ===
Party	Candidate	Votes
Catalan Republican	Lluís Companys i Jover	4.692
Regionalist	Pedro Pascual de Salisachs	2.644
Catalan Republican hold

=== Villanueva ===
Party	Candidate	Votes
Regionalist	José Bertrán y Musitu	3.909
Catalan Republican	Joan Ventosa y Roig	3.124
Regionalist hold

=== San Feliu de Llobregat ===
Party	Candidate	Votes
Regionalist	Antoni Miracle i Mercader	4.381
Monarchist	Pedro Álvarez, Liberal	3.588
Republican	Serra y Cañameras	76
Regionalist hold

=== Barcelona, multi-member constituency (7 seats) ===
Party	Candidate	Votes
Regionalists	Francesc Cambó i Batlle	19.766
Regionalists	Antonio Martínez Domingo	19.508
Regionalists	Pedro Rahola y Molinas	19.100
Regionalists	Magin Morera y Galicia	18.499
Radical Republicans	Alejandro Lerroux García	17.177
Radical Republicans	Emiliano Iglesias y Ambrosio	15.491
Independent Jaimist	Narciso Batlle y Baro	16.856
Catalan Action	Antoni Rovira i Virgili	15.163
Socialists	Manuel Serra Moret	3.391
Socialists	Joan Salas i Antón	3.107
Tenants' Chamber	José Villalta Comes	3.115
Liberal	Federico Schwartz	2.269
Communists	Acher, "the poet"	
Communists	¿?	
Communists	¿?	
Communists	¿?	
Regionalist hold
Radical Republicans hold
Independent Jaimist hold

=== Mataró ===
Party	Candidate	Votes
Independent	Luis Moret y Catala	4.959
Nationalist	Antoni Mariá	1.840
Republican	Joaquim Escofet y Cuscó	459
Independent hold

=== Arenys de Mar ===
Party	Candidate	Votes
Autonomist Monarchist	Santiago Güell y López	4.329
Monarchist	José María Milá y Camps	4.106
Republican	Luis Sisquella	Retired
Others		17
Autonomist Monarchist hold

== Tarragona (8 seats) ==
Competing parties	Seats		
Competing parties	A.29	Cont.	Total
Regionalist League	0	2	2
Liberal Democratic Party	0	1	1
Federal Democratic Republican Party	0	1	1
Liberal Left	0	1	1
Catalan Republican Party	0	1	1
Romanonists	0	1	1
Independents	0	1	1
Liberal Conservative Party	0	0	0
Radical Republican Party	0	0	0
Nationalist Republican Party	0	0	0
Republican (non-party affiliation)	0	0	0
Total	0	8	8

=== Gandesa ===
Party	Candidate	Votes
Regionalist	Carlos Maristany i Benito	4.992
Radical Republican	Joan Caballé i Goyeneche	4.169
Others		2
Regionalist gain from Radical Republican

=== Valls ===
Party	Candidate	Votes
Liberal Left	Albert Dasca i Boada	4.073
Nationalist Republican	Pau Robert i Rabadà	1.825
Regionalist	Tomàs Mallol i Bosch	Retired
Others		71
Liberal Left gain from Regionalist

=== Tarragona-Reus-Falset, multi-member constituency (3 seats) ===
Party	Candidate	Votes
Independent Liberal	Josep Nicolau Sabater	10.408
Regionalist	Eduardo Recasens Mercade	9.224
Federal Republican	Julià Nougués Subirá	8.304
Conservative	Lluís de Morenés y García-Alesson	369
Independent Liberal hold
Regionalist gain from Conservative
Federal Republican hold

=== El Vendrell ===
Party	Candidate	Votes
Romanonist	Lluís Plandiura y Pou	4.351
Catalan Republican	Lluís Figueroa y María	3.941
Others		10
Romanonist gain from Catalan Republican

=== Tortosa ===
Party	Candidate	Votes
Catalan Republican	Marcelino Domingo y Sanjuán	4.432
Liberal Democrat	Valentín González Bárcena	3.142
Conservative	José Martínez Villar	1.194
Others		9
Catalan Republican gain from Conservative

=== Roquetas ===
Party	Candidate	Votes
Liberal Democrat	Manuel Kindelán y de la Torre	6.306
Regionalist	Tomás de Aquino Pou de Foxà	1.560
Republican	Josep Berenguer i Cros	643
Liberal Democrat hold

== Balearic Islands (7 seats) ==
Competing parties	Seats		
Competing parties	A.29	Cont.	Total
Liberal Left	0	4	4
Maurist Party	0	2	2
Ciervist Conservatives	0	1	1
Republicans (non-party affiliation)	0	0	0
Dissident Liberal Party	0	0	0
Independents	0	0	0
Total	0	7	7

=== Ibiza ===
Party	Candidate	Votes
Liberal Left	Carles Roman Ferrer	2.712
Dissident Liberal Party (Note: Supported by Juan March)	Pere Matutes Noguera	1.367
Maurist	Lluís Tur Palau	835
Liberal Left gain from Maurist

=== Palma de Mallorca, multi-member constituency (5 seats) ===
Party	Candidate	Votes
Liberal Left	Juan March Ordinas	30.152
Liberal Left	Luís Alemany Pujol	28.139
Liberal Left	Alejandro Roselló y Pastors	27.665
Maurists	Antonio Maura Montaner	21.730
Maurists	José Cotoner Allendesalazar	21.371
Maurists	José Socías Gradoli	20.867
Independent Liberal	Valeriano Weyler	6.327
¿?	Rafael Milla	35
¿?	José López	34
¿?	César Rodríguez	33
Liberal Left gain from Maurist

=== Mahón ===
Stalemate (Note: According to Article 28 of the Electoral Law, which stipulates that the one who had previously obtained representation in the Cortes for the district must be chosen, the tie is resolved in favor of Mr. García Parreño.)
Party	Candidate	Votes
Ciervist	Guillermo García Parreño López	4.171
Republican	José Teodoro Canet Menéndez	4.171
Ciervist hold

== León (10 seats) ==
Competing parties	Seats		
Competing parties	A.29	Cont.	Total
Liberal Democratic Party	2	6	8
Liberal Conservative Party	0	1	1
Liberal Left	1	0	1
Republican (non-party affiliation)	0	0	0
Independent	0	0	0
Total	3	7	10

=== Murias de Paredes ===
Party	Candidate	Votes
Conservative	José Álvarez Arias	5.469
¿?	Segundo García	2.780
Conservative hold

=== La Vecilla ===
Party	Candidate	Votes
Liberal Democrat	Fernando Merino Villarino (Note: Having been elected by two districts, the draw was carried out in accordance with article 27 of the Electoral Law, and he was assigned to represent the district of León and cease to represent La Vecilla.)	4.540
Leonesist	Francisco Molleda Garcés	179
Others		3
Liberal Democrat hold

=== Riaño ===
Party	Candidate	Votes
Liberal Democrat	Carlos Merino y Mateo-Sagasta	3.356
Leonesist	Mariano Molleda Garcés	2.718
¿?	Francisco del Río Alonso	0
Liberal Democrat gain from Conservative

=== Ponferrada ===
Party	Candidate	Votes
Liberal Democrat	José López y López	6.496
Conservative	Severo Gómez Núñez	998
Liberal Democrat hold

=== Villafranca del Bierzo ===
Party	Candidate	Votes
Liberal Left	Luis Belaunde Costa	Article 29
Liberal Left hold

=== León ===
Party	Candidate	Votes
Liberal Democrat	Fernando Merino Villarino	4.995
Republican	Félix Gordón Ordás	1.621
Liberal Democrat gain from Maurist

=== Sahagún ===
Party	Candidate	Votes
Liberal Democrat	Juan Barriobero Armas	5.796
¿?	Arsenio Valbona	50
Conservative	Mariano Andrés Lascús	21
Others		6
Liberal Democrat gain from Conservative

=== Astorga ===
Party	Candidate	Votes
Liberal Democrat	Manuel Gullón y García-Prieto	Article 29
Liberal Democrat hold

=== La Bañeza ===
Party	Candidate	Votes
Liberal Democrat	Antonio Pérez Crespo	Article 29
Liberal Democrat hold

=== Valencia de Don Juan ===
Party	Candidate	Votes
Liberal Democrat	Mariano Alonso-Castrillo y Bayón	5.113
¿?	Andrés Garrido	160
Liberal Democrat hold

== Zamora (7 seats) ==
Competing parties	Seats		
Competing parties	A.29	Cont.	Total
Liberal Democratic Party	1	1	2
Liberal Left	2	0	2
Romanonists	1	0	1
Zamorists	1	0	1
Liberal Conservative Party	0	0	0
Liberal Party (non-factional)	0	0	0
Agrarians	0	0	0
Maurist Party	0	0	0
Independents	0	0	0
Total	5	1	6 (Note: The election in Toro was annulled)

=== Puebla de Sanabria ===
Party	Candidate	Votes
Romanonist	José Abril Ochoa	Article 29
Romanonist hold

=== Benavente ===
Party	Candidate	Votes
Liberal Democrat	Leopoldo Tordesillas y Fernández de Córdoba	Article 29
Liberal Democrat hold

=== Alcañices ===
Party	Candidate	Votes
Zamorist	Eduardo Cobián y Fernández de Córdoba	Article 29
Zamorist gain from Conservative

=== Villalpando ===
Party	Candidate	Votes
Liberal Democrat	Teodoro Seebold Zarauz	5.863
Liga Agraria		593
Maurist	Mariano Zapico	387
Liberal Democrat hold

=== Bermillo de Sayago ===
Party	Candidate	Votes
Liberal Left	Miguel Núñez Bragado	Article 29
Liberal Left hold

=== Toro ===
Elección anulada
Party	Candidate	Votes
Conservative	Alfonso Ramírez de Arellano y Esteban	4.482
Liberal	Jaime Cussó y Maurell	2.849
Agrarian	Marcelino Arana y Franco	961
Independent Romanonist	García Morales	
Maurist	Mariano Zapico	Retired
Left Vacant. Previously held by a Conservative

=== Zamora ===
Party	Candidate	Votes
Liberal Left	Santiago Alba Bonifaz	Article 29
Liberal Left gain from Conservative

== Salamanca (7 seats) ==
Competing parties	Seats		
Competing parties	A.29	Cont.	Total
Liberal Conservative Party	0	2	2
Romanonists	1	0	1
Agrarians	0	1	1
Reformist Party	0	1	1
Independents	0	2	2
Republicans (non-party affiliation)	0	0	0
Total	1	6	7

=== Ledesma ===
Party	Candidate	Votes
Agrarian	Cándido Casanova Gorjón	4.309
Republican	José Marimón Calaf	3.253
Agrarian gain from Conservative

=== Salamanca ===
Party	Candidate	Votes
Popular Candidature	Juán Mirat Domínguez	5.687
Conservative	Diego Martínez Veloz	2.780
Popular Candidature gain from Conservative

=== Peñaranda de Bracamonte ===
Party	Candidate	Votes
Conservative	Diego Martínez Veloz	4.982
¿?	Liaño	4.192
Conservative hold

=== Vitigudino ===
Supreme Court ruling (Note: Capdevila was initially named the winner. On June 1, 1923, the Supreme Court declared the election null and void, proclaiming Enrique Carrión Vecín the winner in his place.)
Party	Candidate	Votes
Independent	Enrique Carrión Vecín	3.936
Reformist	Luis Capdevila Gelabert	3.861
Independent gain from Reformist

=== Ciudad Rodrigo ===
Party	Candidate	Votes
Romanonist	Clemente de Velasco y Sánchez-Arjona	Article 29
Romanonist hold

=== Sequeros ===
Party	Candidate	Votes
Conservative	Eloy Bullón Fernández	6.873
Republican	Gonzalo Queipo de Llano	1.280
Conservative hold

=== Béjar ===
Party	Candidate	Votes
Reformist	Filiberto Villalobos González	3.344
¿?	Giménez	1.313
Reformist hold

== Santander (5 seats) ==
Competing parties	Seats		
Competing parties	A.29	Cont.	Total
Liberal Conservative Party	3	0	3
Liberal Democratic Party	2	0	2
Total	5	0	5

=== Santander, multi-member district (3 seats) ===
Party	Candidate	Votes
Conservative	Luis Fernández-Hontoria y Uhagón	Article 29
Liberal Democrat	Enrique Melquíades Pico Martínez	Article 29
Conservative	Juan José Ruano de la Sota	Article 29
Conservative hold
Liberal Democrat hold

=== Laredo ===
Party	Candidate	Votes
Conservative	Francisco Albo Abascal	Article 29
Conservative hold

=== Cabuérniga ===
Party	Candidate	Votes
Liberal Democrat	Pablo de Garnica y Echeverría	Article 29
Liberal Democrat hold

== Palencia (5 seats) ==
Competing parties	Seats		
Competing parties	A.29	Cont.	Total
Agrarian Conservative Party	0	3	3
Liberal Democratic Party	0	1	1
Liberal Left	0	1	1
Independents	0	0	0
Total	0	5	5

=== Cervera de Pisuerga ===
Party	Candidate	Votes
Liberal Democrat	Ramón Álvarez-Mon y Basanta	4.584
Agrarian Conservative	Ángel Ruiz de Huidobro y García de los Ríos	4.379
Liberal Democrat gain from Agrarian Conservative

=== Saldaña ===
Party	Candidate	Votes
Agrarian Conservative	Mariano Osorio Arévalo	5.139
Liberal Democrat	Ramón Álvarez-Mon y Basanta	715
Agrarian Conservative hold

=== Carrión de los Condes ===
Party	Candidate	Votes
Liberal Left	Jerónimo Arroyo López	4.367
Castellanist	Juan Díaz-Caneja Candanedo	1.234
Liberal Left gain from Agrarian Conservative

=== Astudillo ===
Party	Candidate	Votes
Agrarian Conservative	Manuel Martínez de Azcoitia y Herrero	5.411
¿?	Enríque Rodríguez	715
Agrarian Conservative hold

=== Palencia ===
Party	Candidate	Votes
Agrarian Conservative	Abilio Calderón Rojo	5.932
Independent Conservative	Juan Polanco Crespo	715
Agrarian Conservative hold

== Burgos (8 seats) ==
Competing parties	Seats		
Competing parties	A.29	Cont.	Total
Liberal Democratic Party	1	3	4
Romanonists	0	1	1
Ciervists	0	1	1
Liberal Left	0	1	1
Maurist Party	0	1	1
Liberal Conservative Party	0	0	0
Integrist Party	0	0	0
Total	1	7	8

=== Villarcayo ===
Party	Candidate	Votes
Maurist	Fernando María de Ybarra y de la Revilla	5.652
¿?	Paulino García del Moral	2.633
Maurist hold

=== Miranda de Ebro ===
Party	Candidate	Votes
Liberal Democrat	Diego de Saavedra y Gaitán de Ayala	3.471
Conservative	Antonio María de Encío	3.357
Liberal Democrat gain from Conservative

=== Castrojeriz ===
Party	Candidate	Votes
Romanonist	Cástulo Gutiérrez Manrique	4.300
Conservative	Amadeo Rilova	3.825
Romanonist gain from Ciervist

=== Burgos, multi-member constituency (3 seats) ===
Party	Candidate	Votes
Liberal Union	Aurelio Gómez González, Liberal Democrat	10.446
Liberal Union	Antonio de Arteche y Villabaso, Liberal Left	9.016
Ciervist	Francisco Aparicio Ruiz	8.512
Integrist	Francisco Estévanez Rodríguez	8.171
Liberal Union gain from Conservative

=== Salas de los Infantes ===
Party	Candidate	Votes
Liberal Democrat	José Fournier y Franco	4.479
Ciervist	Luis de la Peña Braña	2.447
Liberal Democrat gain from Ciervist

=== Aranda de Duero ===
Party	Candidate	Votes
Liberal Democrat	Santos Arias de Miranda y Berdugo	Article 29
Liberal Democrat hold

== Valladolid (6 seats) ==
Competing parties	Seats		
Competing parties	A.29	Cont.	Total
Liberal Left	2	2	4
Liberal Conservative Party	0	1	1
Maurist Party	1	0	1
Agrarians	0	0	0
Spanish Socialist Workers' Party	0	0	0
Total	3	3	6

=== Villalón de Campos ===
Party	Candidate	Votes
Liberal Left	Justo González Garrido	Article 29
Liberal Left gain from Conservative

=== Nava del Rey ===
Party	Candidate	Votes
Liberal Left	José María Zorita Díez	Article 29
Liberal Left hold

=== Valladolid, multi-member district (3 seats) ===
Party	Candidate	Votes
Liberal Left	Leoncio Stampa Stampa	13.382
Liberal Left	Emilio Gómez Díez	12.117
Conservatives	Juan Antonio Llorente García	7.291
Conservatives	Santos Vallejo García	3.624
Agrarian	Pedro Martín Martín	6.438
Socialists	Pablo Iglesias Posse	658
Socialists	Fernando de los Ríos Urruti	590
Liberal Left gain from Maurist

=== Medina del Campo ===
Party	Candidate	Votes
Maurist	Juan Antonio Gamazo Abarca	Article 29
Maurist hold

== Soria (4 seats) ==
Competing parties	Seats		
Competing parties	A.29	Cont.	Total
Liberal Conservative Party	1	2	3
Federal Democratic Republican Party	0	1	1
Liberal Democratic Party	0	0	0
Republican (non-party affiliation)	0	0	0
Liberal Party (non-factional)	0	0	0
Total	1	3	4

=== El Burgo de Osma ===
Party	Candidate	Votes
Federal Republican	Manuel Hilario Ayuso Iglesias	4.390
Liberal Democrat	Tomás Elorrieta y Artaza	3.331
Federal Republican gain from Conservative

=== Soria ===
Party	Candidate	Votes
Conservative	Luis de Marichalar y Monreal	4.390
Republican	Adolfo Hinojar Pons	3.331
Conservative hold

=== Almazán ===
Party	Candidate	Votes
Conservative	Ignacio de Palacio Maroto	Article 29
Conservative hold

=== Ágreda ===
Party	Candidate	Votes
Conservative	Jesús Cánovas del Castillo y Vallejo	4.390
Republican	Anastasio Victoria	1.892
Liberal	Celestino de Córdova	1.654
Conservative hold

== Logroño (4 seats) ==
Competing parties	Seats		
Competing parties	A.29	Cont.	Total
Liberal Democratic Party	2	2	4
Liberal Conservative Party	0	0	0
Independents	0	0	0
Total	2	2	4

=== Santo Domingo de la Calzada ===
Party	Candidate	Votes
Liberal Democrat	Miguel Villanueva Gómez	Article 29
Liberal Democrat hold

=== Logroño ===
Party	Candidate	Votes
Liberal Democrat	Amós Salvador y Sáenz-Carreras	5.830
Independent Conservative	Saturnino Ulargui	3.784
Liberal Democrat hold

=== Torrecilla de Cameros ===
Party	Candidate	Votes
Liberal Democrat	Alberto Villanueva Labayen	Article 29
Liberal Democrat hold

=== Arnedo ===
Party	Candidate	Votes
Liberal Democrat	Isidoro Rodrigánez y Sánchez-Guerra	Won
Conservative	Guillermo Sáenz de Tejada	
Liberal Democrat hold

== Ávila (4 seats) ==
Competing parties	Seats		
Competing parties	A.29	Cont.	Total
Liberal Left	1	1	2
Liberal Conservative Party	1	1	2
Total	2	2	4

=== Arévalo ===
Party	Candidate	Votes
Liberal Left	Alejandro Fernández Araoz	5.730
¿?		
Liberal Left gain from Conservative

=== Piedrahíta ===
Party	Candidate	Votes
Conservative	Jorge Silvela Loring	9.317
¿?		
Conservative hold

=== Ávila ===
Party	Candidate	Votes
Liberal Left	Nicasio Velayos Velayos	Article 29
Liberal Left gain from Conservative

=== Arenas de San Pedro ===
Party	Candidate	Votes
Conservative	Emilio Ortuño Berte	Article 29
Conservative hold

== Segovia (4 seats) ==
Competing parties	Seats		
Competing parties	A.29	Cont.	Total
Liberal Conservative Party	0	2	2
Liberal Left	1	1	2
Liberal Democratic Party	0	0	0
Agrarians	0	0	0
Independents	0	0	0
Total	2	2	4

=== Cuéllar ===
Party	Candidate	Votes
Liberal Left	Mariano Matesanz de la Torre	Article 29
Liberal Left hold

=== Riaza ===
Party	Candidate	Votes
Conservative	José Gil de Biedma	4.897
Agrarian	Pedro Redondo Sanz	2.288
Others		8
Conservative hold

=== Santa María la Real de Nieva ===
Party	Candidate	Votes
Conservative	Pedro Iradier Elías	3.900
Liberal Democrat	Wenceslao Delgado García	3.493
Conservative hold

=== Segovia ===
Party	Candidate	Votes
Liberal Left	Humberto Llorente Regidor	4.759
Independent Liberal	Gregorio Bernabé Pedrazuela	2.379
Independent	Luis García Ubtanda	69
Others		14
Conservative	Rufino Cano de Rueda	Retired
Liberal Left gain from Conservative

== Madrid (13 seats) ==
Competing parties	Seats		
Competing parties	A.29	Cont.	Total
Spanish Socialist Workers' Party	0	5	5
Monarchist-Mercantile Coalition	0	3	3 (Note: 1 Romanonist, 1 Reformist and 1 independent)
Liberal Democratic Party	1	1	2
Romanonists	1	0	1
Agrarian Liberal Party	0	1	1
Independents	0	1	1
Maurist Party	0	0	0
Republican Federation	0	0	0
Communist Party of Spain	0	0	0
Total	2	11	13

=== Torrelaguna ===
Party	Candidate	Votes
Liberal Democrat	Juan Aguilar	5.066
¿?	Valentín G. Ugalde	3.724
Liberal Democrat gain from Conservative

=== Madrid, multi-member constituency (8 seats) ===
Party	Candidate	Votes
Socialists	Julián Besteiro Fernández	21.537
Socialists	Pablo Iglesias Posse	21.404
Socialists	Manuel Cordero Pérez	21.166
Socialists	Fernando de los Ríos Urruti	19.934
Socialists	Andrés Saborit Colomer	19.730
Socialists	Francisco Largo Caballero	18.746
Monárquist-Mercantile	Antonio Sacristán Zavala	20.646
Monárquist-Mercantile	Francisco García Molinas, Romanonist	19.163
Monárquist-Mercantile	Francisco Álvarez Rodríguez-Villamil, Reformist	18.991
Monárquist-Mercantile	Luis Garrido Juaristi	18.724
Monárquist-Mercantile	José Álvarez Arranz, Ciervist	18.414
Monárquist-Mercantile	Emilio Blanco Parrondo	17.758
Maurists	Alfredo Serrano Jover	15.252
Maurists	Antonio Goicoechea	14.954
Maurists	Luis López Doriga	14.006
Maurists	Ramón del Rivero	13.658
Maurists	Miguel Colom	13.038
Maurists	Antonio Conrado	12.934
Republicans	Roberto Castrovido	11.790
Republicans	Emilio Menéndez Pallarés	9.694
Republicans	Rafael Salillas	8.363
Republicans	Gabriel Montero	8.127
Republicans	Adolfo Álvarez Buylla	8.023
Republicans	Antonio Jaen	7.252
Communists	José María Viñuelas	2.481
Communists	Óscar Pérez Solís	1.620
Communists	Manuel Núñez Arsenas	1.559
Communists	Ramón Lamoneda	1.460
Communists	Antonio García Quejido	1.338
Communists	Isidoro Rodríguez	1.336
Socialist gain from Monarchist

=== Alcalá de Henares ===
Party	Candidate	Votes
Agrarian Liberal	Prudencio Muñoz Álvarez	8.583
Socialist	Manuel Cordero Pérez	1.752
Agrarian Liberal gain from Conservative

=== Navalcarnero ===
Party	Candidate	Votes
Liberal Democrat	Juan Fernández Rodríguez	5.868
Maurist	Luis Gallinal Pedregal	2.858
Liberal Democrat hold

=== Getafe ===
Party	Candidate	Votes
Liberal Democrat	Francisco de Ussía y Cubas	Article 29
Liberal Democrat hold

=== Chinchón ===
Party	Candidate	Votes
Romanonist	Luis Ballesteros Tejada	Article 29
Romanonist hold

== Guadalajara (5 seats) ==
Competing parties	Seats		
Competing parties	A.29	Cont.	Total
Romanonists	0	5	5
Agrarians	0	0	0
Liberal Conservative Party	0	0	0
Independents	0	0	0
Total	0	5	5

=== Sigüenza ===
Party	Candidate	Votes
Romanonist	Alfredo Sanz Vives	6.796
Agrarian	Alberto Yust y Más	76
Conservative	Manuel Miralles	76
Romanonist hold

=== Brihuega ===
Party	Candidate	Votes
Romanonist	Fernando Luca de Tena e Ita	4.039
Agrarian	Felipe Serrano/Count of San Rafael	1.668 (Note: Proclaimed so that the Count of San Rafael, who was the true agrarian candidate for Brihuega, could "fight".)
Romanonist gain from Conservative

=== Molina de Aragón ===
Party	Candidate	Votes
Romanonist	Juan Núñez Anchústegui	7.266
Agrarian	Carlos Hernando	687
Romanonist hold

=== Guadalajara ===
Partial election on 26 August (Note: Due to Romanones' resignation from his seat, he would be replaced by Carlos Figueroa and Alonso-Martínez.)
Party	Candidate	Votes
Romanonist	Álvaro Figueroa Torres	6.870
Agrarian	Agustín Robles Vega	1.133
Romanonist hold

=== Pastrana ===
Party	Candidate	Votes
Romanonist	Manuel Brocas Gómez	7.684
Agrarian	Luis Fernández Navarro	1.148
Independent Romanonist	Juan Zabia	Retired
Romanonist hold

== Toledo (8 seats) ==
Competing parties	Seats		
Competing parties	A.29	Cont.	Total
Romanonists	2	1	3
Maurist Party	0	2	2
Liberal Democratic Party	0	2	2
Liberal Conservative Party	1	0	1
Liberal Party (non-factional)	0	0	0
Reformist Party	0	0	0
Spanish Socialist Workers' Party	0	0	0
Communist Party of Spain	0	0	0
Independents	0	0	0
Total	3	5	8

=== Talavera de la Reina ===
Party	Candidate	Votes
Romanonist	Tomás de Beruete y Udaete	Article 29
Romanonist hold

=== Illescas ===
Party	Candidate	Votes
Liberal Democrat	Manuel Posada y García Barrios	4.841
Maurist	Ambrosio Vélez Hierros	3.517
Others		13
Liberal Democrat gain from Maurist

=== El Puente del Arzobispo ===
Party	Candidate	Votes
Maurist	Francisco Leyún Villanueva	6.028
Reformist	Manuel Azaña Díaz	3.897
Maurist hold

=== Torrijos ===
Party	Candidate	Votes
Romanonist	Manuel de Taramona y Díaz de Entresotos	Article 29
Romanonist hold

=== Toledo ===
Party	Candidate	Votes
Maurist	José Félix de Lequerica Erquiza	4.792
Liberal	Manuel Gómez y García Barzanallana	3.726
Socialist	Julián Besteiro Fernández	25
Communist	José María Viñuelas	14
Others		6
Maurist hold

=== Ocaña ===
Party	Candidate	Votes
Romanonist	Adelaido Rodríguez Fernández Avilés	5.224
Independent Liberal	Juan Rózpide González	3.284
Romanonist gain from Conservative

=== Orgaz ===
Party	Candidate	Votes
Conservative	José Díaz-Cordovés y Gómez	Article 29
Conservative hold

=== Quintanar de la Orden ===
Party	Candidate	Votes
Liberal Democrat	Práxedes Zancada Ruata	4.167
Conservative	Ángel Conde y Arroyo	3.660
Liberal Democrat gain from Conservative

== Cuenca (6 seats) ==
Competing parties	Seats		
Competing parties	A.29	Cont.	Total
Liberal Conservative Party	2	0	2
Maurist Party	0	1	1
Ciervist Conservatives	0	1	1
Liberal Democratic Party	1	0	1
Liberal Party (non-factional)	0	1	1
Reformist Party	0	0	0
Romanonists	0	0	0
Independents	0	0	0
Total	3	3	6

=== Huete ===
Party	Candidate	Votes
Conservative	Fernando Sartorius y Díaz de Mendoza	Article 29
Conservative hold

=== Tarancón ===
Annulled election (Note: On June 6, 1923, the Supreme Court's report was approved, proposing the annulment of the election and the need for a new call for elections.)
Party	Candidate	Votes
Ciervist	Enrique Gosálvez y Sources-Manresa	4.764
Independent Conservative	Juan Cervantes y Sanz de Andino	4.064
Ciervist gain from Conservative

=== Cuenca ===
Party	Candidate	Votes
Maurist	Joaquín Fanjul Goñi	5.305
Reformist	Tomás Sierra Rustarazo	2.415
Romanonist	Arturo Ballesteros Rubio	1.988
Maurist hold

=== Cañete ===
Annulled election (Note: He did not submit his credentials within the regulatory deadline. On June 27, the Supreme Court's report was approved, proposing the annulment of the election and the need for a new election. In the new election, carried out on 26 August, Ochoa once again won and didn't present his credentials, leaving the seat vacant)
Party	Candidate	Votes
Liberal	José Ochoa Lledó	5.099
Maurist	Enrique María de Arribas y Turull	5.007
Left vacant. Previously held by a Maurist

=== San Clemente ===
Party	Candidate	Votes
Conservative	Mariano Marfil García	Article 29
Conservative hold

=== Motilla del Palancar ===
Party	Candidate	Votes
Liberal Democrat	Manuel Casanova Conderana	Article 29
Liberal Democrat hold

== Ciudad Real (6 seats) ==
Competing parties	Seats		
Competing parties	A.29	Cont.	Total
Agrarian Liberal Party	1	2	3
Liberal Conservative Party	0	1	1
Romanonists	0	1	1
Independents	0	1	1
Liberal Party (non-factional)	0	0	0
Ciervist Conservative	0	0	0
Total	1	5	6

=== Ciudad Real ===
Party	Candidate	Votes
Agrarian Liberal	Fernando Acedo-Rico y Jarava	Article 29
Agrarian Liberal gain from Conservative

=== Daimiel ===
Party	Candidate	Votes
Independent	Arsenio Martínez-Campos y de la Viesca	6.895
Liberal	Antonio Criado y Carrión Vega	4.330
Independent hold

=== Alcázar de San Juan ===
Party	Candidate	Votes
Agrarian Liberal	Rafael Gasset Chinchilla	8.877
Independent	José Antonio de Sangróniz	2.413
Agrarian Liberal hold

=== Almadén ===
Party	Candidate	Votes
Agrarian Liberal	Germán Inza Álvarez	5.781
Independent	Ramón Solano y Manso de Zúñiga	4.350
Agrarian Liberal gain from Independent

=== Almagro ===
Modified election (Note: The Supreme Court would annul the election and demand a re-run which was won by Ramón Díez)
Party	Candidate	Votes
Romanonist	Santiago Ugarte y Aurreocechea	5.328
Conservative	Ramón Díez de Rivera	4.387
Conservative hold

=== Villanueva de los Infantes ===
Party	Candidate	Votes
Conservative	Pascual Díez de Rivera y Casares	10.197
¿?	José de Lís Agudo	516
Ciervist	Manuel Fernández Yáñez y Rojo	161
Conservative hold

== Cáceres (7 seats) ==
=== Hoyos ===
Party	Candidate	Votes
Conservative	Juan Alcalá Galiano y Osma	Won
¿?		
Conservative hold

=== Coria ===
Party	Candidate	Votes
Liberal Left	Juan Muñoz Casillas	Won
¿?		
Liberal Left gain from Conservative

=== Alcántara ===
Party	Candidate	Votes
Conservative	Antonio Garay Vitorica	Article 29
Conservative hold

=== Plasencia ===
Party	Candidate	Votes
Liberal Democrat	Arturo Gamonal Calaf	Won
¿?		
Liberal Democrat gain from Conservative

=== Cáceres ===
Party	Candidate	Votes
Independent	Juan Vitorica Casuso	Article 29
Independent hold

=== Navalmoral de la Mata ===
Party	Candidate	Votes
Liberal Democrat	José Rosado Gil	Won
¿?		
Liberal Democrat hold

=== Trujillo ===
Party	Candidate	Votes
Liberal Democrat	José Granda y Torres-Cabrera	Article 29
Liberal Democrat gain from Conservative

== Badajoz (10 seats) ==
=== Badajoz, multi-member constituency (3 seats) ===
Party	Candidate	Votes
Liberal Democrat	Jesús Lopo Gómez	14.798
Independent	Antonio Callejo Sáez	14.550
Maurist	Francisco Marín y Beltrán de Lis	14.123
Conservative	José María Albarrán Ramos Izquierdo	12.529
Socialist	Narciso Vázquez Torres	1.887
Radical Republican	Manuel Barbosa García	1.587
Independent	Francisco Torres Muñoz	320
Communist	José María Viñuelas	130
Federal Republican	Narciso Vázquez Lemus	52
Others		344
Liberal Democrat hold
Independent gain from Conservative
Maurist hold

=== Mérida ===
Party	Candidate	Votes
Liberal Democrat	Mariano Larios Rodríguez	3.652
Independent Liberal	Sancho Conejo Coca	3.197
Conservative	Antonio Pacheco y Lerdo de Tejada	2.844
Socialist	Manuel Cordero Pérez	192
Others		7
Liberal Democrat gain from Conservative

=== Villanueva de la Serena ===
Party	Candidate	Votes
Liberal Left	Feliciano Gómez-Bravo y Martínez de la Mata	2.108
Conservative	Antonio Fernández Daza y Gómez Braco	1.312
Liberal Left gain from Conservative

=== Don Benito ===
Election annulled
Party	Candidate	Votes
Conservative	Luis Hermida Villega	4.985
Republican	Manuel Ciges Aparicio	4.748
Liberal	Carlos Groizard y Coronado	21
Conservative hold

=== Almendralejo ===
Party	Candidate	Votes
Liberal Democrat	Antonio Texeira Perillán	8.316
Conservative	José Gutiérrez Silva	3.729
Others		15
Liberal Democrat gain from Conservative

=== Castuera ===
Party	Candidate	Votes
Romanonist	Álvaro de Figueroa y Alonso-Martínez	Article 29
Romanonist hold

=== Fregenal de la Sierra ===
Party	Candidate	Votes
Romanonist	Jesús Corujo Valvidares	Article 29
Romanonist hold

=== Llerena ===
Party	Candidate	Votes
Reformist	Juan Uña Sartou	5.948
Maurist	Federico Carlos Bas Vasallo	4.747
Others		3
Reformist gain from Maurist

== Castellón de la Plana (7 seats) ==
=== Morella ===
Party	Candidate	Votes
Ciervist	Luis Montiel Balanzat	4.910
¿?	José María de la Figuera y de la Cerdá	3.503
Ciervist hold

=== Vinaroz ===
Party	Candidate	Votes
Liberal Democrat	Ramón Sáiz de Carlos	Won
¿?		
Liberal Democrat hold

=== Albocácer ===
Party	Candidate	Votes
Ciervist	Ricardo de la Cierva y Codorníu	5.209
¿?	Sr. Santacruz	4.667
Ciervist hold

=== Lucena del Cid ===
Party	Candidate	Votes
Liberal Democrat	Vicente Cantos Figuerola	Article 29
Liberal Democrat hold

=== Segorbe ===
Party	Candidate	Votes
Liberal Democrat	Juan Navarro Reverter y Gomis	Won
¿?		
Liberal Democrat hold

=== Castellón ===
Party	Candidate	Votes
Radical Republican	Fernando Gasset Lacasaña	Article 29
Radical Republican hold

=== Nules ===
Party	Candidate	Votes
Liberal Democrat	Faustino Valentín Torrejón	Won
Ciervist (Note: He was also a member of the CT)	Jaime Chicharro Sánches-Guío	
Liberal Democrat gain from Ciervist

== Valencia (15 seats) ==
=== Chelva-Ademuz ===
Party	Candidate	Votes
Liberal Left	Miguel Alcalá Martínez	7.289
¿?	Alas Pumariño	Retired
Liberal Left gain from Conservative

=== Liria ===
Party	Candidate	Votes
Romanonist	Juan Izquierdo Alcaide	Article 29
Romanonist hold

=== Sagunto ===
Party	Candidate	Votes
Liberal Democrat	Manuel García del Moral y de Lamata	Victorioso
¿?		
Liberal Democrat hold

=== Requena ===
Party	Candidate	Votes
Liberal Democrat	José García Berlanga Pardo	6.544
Conservative	Rafael Marín Lázaro	5.982
Liberal Democrat gain from Conservative

=== Chiva ===
Party	Candidate	Votes
Liberal Democrat	Manuel Falco Escandón	8.096
¿?	José María Mengual Mengual	370
Autonomist Republican	Antonio Merino Conde	
Liberal Democrat gain from Conservative

=== Torrente ===
Party	Candidate	Votes
Romanonist	José Campos Crespo	Won
¿?		Retired
Romanonist gain from Conservative

=== Valencia, multi-member constituency (3 seats) ===
Party	Candidate	Votes
PURA	Félix Azzati Descalci	11.663
PURA	Adolfo Beltrán Ibáñez	10.836
ARAC (Note: Regional Group of Catholic Action. (In spanish: Agrupación Regional de Acción Católica)) (Note: He was also a member of the Traditionalist Catholic Party and the Popular Social Party)	Luis García Guijarro	10.817
CMM (Note: Ministerial Monarchist Candidature. (In spanish: Candidatura Monárquica Ministerial))	Jose María Lamo de Espinosa	10.543
PURA hold
ARAC gain from CMM

=== Sueca ===
Party	Candidate	Votes
Liberal Left	Emetrio Muga Díez	8.410
Autonomist Republican	Juan Bort Olmos	
Liberal Left gain from Autonomist Republican

=== Enguera ===
Party	Candidate	Votes
Conservative	Carlos Hernández Lázaro	6.704
Republican	José Aparicio Albiñana	2.048
Conservative hold

=== Alcira ===
Party	Candidate	Votes
Reformist	Gustavo Pittaluga Fattorini	8.523
Ciervist	José Montesinos Checa	6.921
Reformist gain from Ciervist

=== Játiva ===
Party	Candidate	Votes
Liberal Democrat	Francisco Rubio Goula	5.763
¿?		
Liberal Democrat gain from Conservative

=== Gandía ===
Party	Candidate	Votes
Liberal Left	Melchor Román Adrover	9.877
¿?	Ibáñez Rizo	207
Liberal Left gain from Ciervist

=== Albaida ===
Party	Candidate	Votes
Conservative	Vicente Puigmoltro Rodríguez Trelles	Article 29
Conservative hold

== Alicante (10 seats) ==
=== Alcoy ===
Party	Candidate	Votes
Romanonist	Joaquín Salvatella Gisbert	5.825
Radical Republican	José Guardiola y Ortiz	3.642

=== Pego ===
Party	Candidate	Votes
Liberal Democrat	José Beneyto Rostoll	5.200
¿?		Retired

=== Denia ===
Party	Candidate	Votes
Liberal Democrat	Salvador Raventos Clivilles	Article 29

=== Villena ===
Party	Candidate	Votes
Liberal Democrat	Antonio Hernández Pérez	Won
¿?	Francisco Soler	

=== Villajoyosa ===
Party	Candidate	Votes
Conservative	José Jorro Miranda	Article 29

=== Alicante, multi-member constituency (3 seats) ===
Party	Candidate	Votes
Liberal Union (Note: Due to a conflict between Villamil and Rojas, the Reformist Party decided to not support the Liberal Union candidature. Several prominent reformists supported Salvatella and Álvarez Estrada's candidatures, but the official party position was for its member to vote for "whom they find more suitable".)	Alfonso de Rojas y Pascual de Bonanza, Liberal Democrat	20.527
Liberal Union	Rafael Beltrán Auso, Liberal	18.271
Conservative	Salavdor Canals y Vinaro	14.794
Independent Liberal	Joaquín Salvatella Gisbert	1.074
Independent Liberal	José Álvarez Estrada	630
Republican	Miguel de Unamuno y Jugo	796

=== Dolores ===
Party	Candidate	Votes
Liberal Democrat	Vicente Ruiz Valarino	5.165
Independent Liberal Left	Joaquín Chapaprieta y Torregrosa	Retired

=== Orihuela ===
Party	Candidate	Votes
Liberal Democrat	José Martínez Arenas	5.773
Independent Liberal	José Lázaro Galdiano	678

== Albacete (5 seats) ==
=== Casas Ibáñez ===
Party	Candidate	Votes
Romanonist	Ramón Ochando Serrano	7.867
Ciervist	Juan García Más	1.091
Others		19

=== Alcaraz ===
Party	Candidate	Votes
Conservative	José Martínez Acacio	Article 29

=== Albacete ===
Party	Candidate	Votes
Liberal Democrat	Félix Suárez Inclán y González Villar	Article 29

=== Almansa ===
Party	Candidate	Votes
Ciervist	Fernando Núñez Robres y Galiano	7.892
Socialist	Isidoro Escandell Úbeda	110
Independent	Ubaldo Fuentes Birlayan	66
Liberal	Francisco Sánchez Silva	14
Conservative	Cosme de Teresa Beltrán	9
Others		8
Reformist	Sr. Fuentes	Retired

=== Hellín ===
Party	Candidate	Votes
Liberal Democrat	Graciano Atienza Fernández	Article 29

== Murcia (11 seats) ==
=== Yecla ===
Party	Candidate	Votes
Ciervist	Vicente Llovera Codorniú	Article 29

=== Cieza ===
Party	Candidate	Votes
Ciervist	Alfonso Pidal y Chico de Guzmán	Article 29

=== Mula ===
Party	Candidate	Votes
Ciervist	Juan de la Cierva y Peñafiel	Article 29

=== Murcia, multi-member constituency (3 seats) ===
Party	Candidate	Votes
Ciervists	Juan de la Cierva y Codorniú	Article 29
Ciervists	Emilio Díez de Revenga y Vicente	Article 29
Romanonist	José María Guillamón Miró	Article 29

=== Lorca ===
Party	Candidate	Votes
Reformist	Tomás de Aquino Arderius Sánchez Fortún	Article 29

=== Cartagena, multi-member constituency (4 seats) ===
Party	Candidate	Votes
Ciervists	Eduardo Espín Vázquez	Article 29
Ciervists	José Maestre Zapata	Article 29
Ciervists	Miguel Rodríguez Valdés	Article 29
Romanonist	José García-Vaso Linares	Article 29

== Huelva (5 seats) ==
=== Huelva, multi-member constituency (3 seats) ===
Party	Candidate	Votes
Conservative	Manuel de Burgos y Domínguez	21.785
Liberal Union	José Limón Caballero, Romanonist	14.893
Liberal Union	Luis Oteyza y García, Liberal Left	11.747
Independent Liberal Left	Nicolás Vázquez de la Corte	7.369

=== Aracena ===
Party	Candidate	Votes
Conservative	Francisco Javier Sánchez Dalp y Calonge de Guzmán	Article 29

=== Valverde del Camino ===
Party	Candidate	Votes
Reformist	José Marchena Colombo	Won
Independent Maurist	Manuel Fernández Balbuena	
Radical Republican	Diego Martínez Barrio	Retired

== Seville (13 seats) ==
=== Seville, multi-member constituency (5 seats) ===
Party	Candidate	Votes
Conservative	Tomás de Ibarra y Lasso de la Vega	13.103
Liberal Left	Antonio Rodríguez de la Borbolla y Serrano	12.370
Liberal Left	Francisco del Castillo y Vaquero	11.711
Commercial Union	Pedro Fernández Palacios Labraña	11.272
Independent Liberal	Juan Ignacio Luca de Tena y García de Torres	9.245
Radical Republican	Diego Martínez Barrios	7.424
Right-wing Coalition	José María López Cepero y Muru	5.308
Independent	Félix Sánchez-Blanco y Sánchez	664
Others		1.523

=== Carmona ===
Party	Candidate	Votes
Conservative	Lorenzo Domínguez Pascual	4.165
Federal Republican	Pedro Rico López	1.085

=== Écija ===
Party	Candidate	Votes
Liberal Democrat	José Centeno González	Article 29

=== Sanlucar la Mayor ===
Party	Candidate	Votes
Conservative	Carlos Cañal y Migolla	9.262
Republican	Juan Caballero López	604

=== Marchena ===
Party	Candidate	Votes
Conservative	Fernando Barón y Martínez Agullo	Article 29

=== Estepa ===
Party	Candidate	Votes
Liberal Left	Manuel Blasco Garzón	9.634
¿?	Manuel Falcó y Álvarez de Toledo	52

=== Utrera ===
Party	Candidate	Votes
Romanonist	Miguel Sánchez Dalp y Calonge de Guzmán	3.896
Independent Liberal Left	Leopoldo de la Maza y Gutiérrez Solana	2.763
Others		1

=== Morón ===
Party	Candidate	Votes
Liberal Left	Manuel Hoyuela Gómez	4.789
Socialist	Manuel Olmedo Serrano	970

=== Cazalla de la Sierra ===
Party	Candidate	Votes
Liberal Left	Ramón Charlo Gómez	9.830
Independent	Antonio Merchán y Silva	73
Others		9

== Cádiz (10 seats) ==
=== Jerez de la Frontera, multi-member district (3 seats) ===
Party	Candidate	Votes
Ciervist	Juan José Romero y Martínez	10.977
Conservative	Patricio Garvey y González de la Mota	10.406
Romanonist	Alfonso Ruiz de Grijalba y López Falcón	9.024
Socialist	Antonio Roma Rubies	1.291
Socialist	Manuel Cordero Pérez	941
Radical Republican	Manuel Moreno Mendoza	798
Independent	Lorenzo López de Carrizosa y de la Viesca	9

=== Cádiz, multi-member district (3 seats) ===
Party	Candidate	Votes
Romanonist	Juan Aramburu e Inda	8.397
Romanonist	Ángel Ferrer y Cagigal	8.361
Conservative	Juan Bautista Lazaga y Patero	5.119
Republican	José Sánchez Robledo	2.426

=== Medina Sidonia ===
Party	Candidate	Votes
Romanonist	Serafín Romeu y Pagés	7.500

=== Algeciras ===
Party	Candidate	Votes
Reformist	Manuel Rodríguez Piñero	5.170
Conservative	José Luis Torres Beleña	4.386

=== El Puerto de Santa María ===
Party	Candidate	Votes
Romanonist	José Morote y Reus	Article 29

=== Grazalema ===
Party	Candidate	Votes
Liberal Democrat	Carlos López Dóriga y Salavierra	Article 29

== Córdoba (9 seats) ==
=== Hinojosa del Duque ===
Party	Candidate	Votes
Conservative	José Castillejo y Castillejo	Article 29

=== Posadas ===
Party	Candidate	Votes
Liberal Democrat	José Ortiz Molinas	Article 29

=== Córdoba, multi-member constituency (3 seats) ===
Party	Candidate	Votes
Liberal Democrat	Eugenio Barroso y Sánchez-Guerra	Article 29
Liberal Democrat	José García Martínez	Article 29
Conservative	Manuel Enríquez Barrios	Article 29

=== Cabra ===
Party	Candidate	Votes
Conservative	José Sánchez-Guerra y Martínez	Article 29

=== Lucena ===
Party	Candidate	Votes
Liberal Democrat	Martín de Rosales y Martel	Article 29

=== Montilla ===
Party	Candidate	Votes
Zamorist	José Fernández Jiménez	Article 29

=== Priego de Córdoba ===
Party	Candidate	Votes
Zamorist	Juan Bufill Torres	Article 29

== Málaga (11 seats) ==
=== Archidona ===
Party	Candidate	Votes
Liberal Left	Alfonso Molina Padilla	Article 29

=== Campillos ===
Party	Candidate	Votes
Conservative	Fabio Bergamín Gutiérrez	Won
¿?		

=== Antequera ===
Party	Candidate	Votes
Conservative	José de Luna Pérez	Article 29

=== Ronda ===
Party	Candidate	Votes
Reformist	Ricardo López Barroso	Article 29

=== Vélez-Málaga ===
Party	Candidate	Votes
Conservative	José Martín Velandia	Won
¿?		

=== Torrox ===
Party	Candidate	Votes
Ciervist	Juan Antonio Pérez-Urruti y Villalobos	Won
¿?		

=== Guacín ===
Party	Candidate	Votes
Liberal Left	Guillermo Moreno Calvo	Won
¿?		

=== Málaga, multi-member constituency (3 seats) ===
Party	Candidate	Votes
Liberal Left	Luis de Armiñán y Pérez	Won
Liberal Left	Manuel Romero Raggio	Won
Conservative	José Estrada Estrada	Won
¿?		

=== Coín ===
Party	Candidate	Votes
Liberal Left	Eduardo Ortega y Gasset	Article 29

== Jaén (9 seats) ==
=== Baeza ===
Party	Candidate	Votes
Conservative	José María Yangüas Messía	Article 29

=== La Carolina ===
Party	Candidate	Votes
Zamorist	Niceto Alcalá-Zamora y Torres	Article 29

=== Úbeda ===
Party	Candidate	Votes
Romanonist	Luis de Figueroa y Alonso-Martínez	8.435
Republican	Juan de Dios y Caballero Morales	5
¿?	Manuel Godoy Caballero	4
Others		1

=== Villacarrillo ===
Party	Candidate	Votes
Zamorist	Miguel Pastor Orozco	Article 29

=== Martos ===
Party	Candidate	Votes
Zamorist	Emilio Sebastián González	4.531
Conservative	Manuel Ruiz Córdoba	4.468
¿?	Joaquín Ramos Marín	30
Others		4

=== Jaén, multi-member constituency (3 seats) ===
Party	Candidate	Votes
Romanonist	Virgilio Anguita Sánchez	Article 29
Liberal Democrat	Luis Fernández Ramos	Article 29
Conservative	Pedro Villar Gómez	Article 29

=== Cazorla ===
Party	Candidate	Votes
Conservative	Mariano de Foronda y González de Villarino	11.106
¿?	Jesús Guerrih Escamilla	7

== Granada (11 seats) ==
=== Loja ===
Supreme Court sentence (Note: On 8th June, the Supreme Court annulled the election of José Chaparieta Rodríguez in favor of Fernández de Córdoba.)
Party	Candidate	Votes
Liberal	José Chaparieta Rodríguez	4.583
Conservative	Gonzalo Fernández de Córdoba y Morales	4.338

=== Granada, multi-member constituency (3 seats) ===
Party	Candidate	Votes
Liberal Union	Pascual Nacher Vilar, Romanonist	14.213
Liberal Union	Agustín Rodríguez Aguilera, Reformist	13.738
Conservative	Eduardo Moreno Agrela	11.039
Independent Liberal Democrat	Santiago Oliveras Santaló	7.713
¿?	Juan Pedro Afán de Ribera y Rodríguez	335

=== Guadix ===
Party	Candidate	Votes
Ciervist	Antonio Marín Hervás	Article 29

=== Baza ===
Party	Candidate	Votes
Liberal Democrat	Heliodoro Suárez-Inclán y González	Article 29

=== Huéscar ===
Party	Candidate	Votes
Conservative	Félix Sánchez Eznarriaga	Article 29

=== Alhama ===
Party	Candidate	Votes
Maurist	Joaquín de Montes y Jovellar	6.254
Liberal	Juan Espejo Hinojosa	2.937

=== Órgiva ===
Party	Candidate	Votes
Liberal Left	Natalio Rivas Santiago	Article 29

=== Motril ===
Party	Candidate	Votes
Liberal Democrat	Isidro Romero Civantos	Article 29

=== Albuñol ===
Party	Candidate	Votes
Liberal Left	Santiago Alba Bonifaz	Article 29

== Almería (8 seats) ==
=== Vélez-Rubio ===
Party	Candidate	Votes
Liberal Democrat	Luis López-Ballesteros y Fernández	Article 29

=== Purchena ===
Party	Candidate	Votes
Conservative	Julio Amado y Reygondaud de Villebardet	Article 29

=== Vera ===
Party	Candidate	Votes
Independent	Augusto Barcia Trelles	Article 29

=== Almería,multi-member constituency (3 seats) ===
Party	Candidate	Votes
Liberal Democrat	Emilio Díaz-Moreu e Irisarry	Article 29
Liberal Democrat	Luis Silvela Casado	Article 29
Conservative	Manuel Jiménez Ramírez	Article 29

=== Berja ===
Party	Candidate	Votes
Conservative	José María Cervantes y Sanz de Andino	Article 29

=== Sorbas ===
Party	Candidate	Votes
Liberal Democrat	Juan Gómez-Acebo y Modet	Article 29

== Santa Cruz de Tenerife (7 seats) ==
=== Los Llanos ===
Party	Candidate	Votes
Conservative	Pedro Poggio y Álvarez	1.181
Romanonist	Ricardo Ruiz y Benítez de Lugo	938

=== Santa Cruz de la Palma ===
Party	Candidate	Votes
Liberal Democrat	Julian Van Baumbergher	1.745
Reformist	Pedro Pérez Díaz	1.474

=== La Gomera ===
Party	Candidate	Votes
Liberal Left	Nicasio León Bencomo	1.789
Independent	Fragoso	808

=== El Hierro ===
Party	Candidate	Votes
Romanonist	Juan de Urquía y Redecilla	Won
Independent Liberal	Gómez Torneros	

=== Santa Cruz de Tenerife, multi-member constituency (3 seats) ===
Party	Candidate	Votes
Liberal Union	Santiago Alba Bonifaz, Liberal Left	8.676
Liberal Union	Andres de Arroyo y González de Chaves, Conservative	8.614
Liberal Union	Félix Eleuterio Benítez de Lugo y Rodríguez, Liberal Democrat	8.495
Radical Republican	Alejandro Lerroux García	5.389
Romanonist	Ricardo Ruiz y Benítez de Lugo	2.395
Socialist	Indalecio Prieto Tuero	590

== Las Palmas de Gran Canaria (5 seats) ==
=== Las Palmas, multi-member constituency (3 seats) ===
Party	Candidate	Votes
Radical Republican	Rafael Guerra del Río	Article 29
Conservative	Leopoldo Matos y Massieu	Article 29
Romanonist	Baldomero Argente del Castillo	Article 29

=== Fuerteventura ===
Party	Candidate	Votes
Liberal Democrat	Salvador Manrique de Lara y Massieu	1.268
Conservative	Luis Richi	757

=== Lanzarote ===
Party	Candidate	Votes
Romanonist	José Betancort Carrera	1.568
Independent Liberal	Rafael Barón	1.517

== Senate ==
=== Barcelona ===
Candidate	Votes
Agustín Riera y Pau	303
Luis Durán y Ventosa	302
Ricardo Ramos Cordero	301
José Estadella Arnó	295
Carlos Vergara Caillaux	9
Alejandro Lerroux García	2
Emiliano Iglesias Ambrosio	2
Blank votes	1
Total	1.215

=== Madrid ===
Candidate	Votes
Eduardo Yáñez Carvallés	236
Luis de Ussía	229
Arturo Soria Hernández	224
Vicente Buendía	222
Felipe Montoya	28
Others	2
Blank votes	1
Total	942
Voting Delegates	241

=== Valencia ===
Candidate	Votes
Eduardo Berenguer	306
Juan José Dómine	305
Juan Bautista Valldecabres	305
José Manteca	304
Blank votes	0
Total	1.220

=== Provinces ===
District	Deputy	Deputy	Deputy
Álava	Ricardo Echevarría Francés	Carlos Ajuria Urigortia	José María González Echevarri
Albacete	Fabián Sabino Lorenzo	Pío Suárez Inclán	Gustavo Ruiz de Grijalba
Alicante	Álvaro Valero de Palma	Vicente Álvarez R. Villamil	José Villalba Riquelme
Almería	Juan Melgar Abreu	Miguel Salvador Carreras	Augusto Gálvez Cañero
Ávila	Césareo Nieto	César Jiménez	Pascual Amal
Badajoz	Pedro Gallardo Calzadilla	José Márquez de Prado	Miguel López de Saa
Baleares	Ramiro Alonso Castrillo	Antonio Pon y Reus	Luis Pascual Bauzá
Burgos	José Martínez de Velasco	Rafael Bermejo Cevallos	Ramón de la Cuesta y Cobo
Cáceres	Juan Bautista Aznar-Cabañas	Andrés Sánchez de la Rosa	Mariano Delgado Gómez Novales
Cádiz	Juan A. Gómez Aramburu	Manuel Semprún Pombo	Luis Gómez Aramburu
Canarias	Antonio Izquierdo Vélez	Pedro del Castillo Olivares	Tomás Salazar Cologán
Castellón	Bernardo Gómez Igual	Luis García de la Rasilla	Antonio Mompeón Matos
Ciudad Real	Miguel Pérez Molina	Antonio Criado Carrión	Emilio González Llana
Córdoba	Francisco de San Julián y Belda	Andrés Peralbo	Florentino Sotomayor
La Coruña	José María Ozores	Joaquín Chapaprieta	Marquese of Villanueva de la Sagra
Cuenca	José María López Cobo	Dalmacio García Izcara	Fernando Muñoz Valsalobre
Gerona	Carlos de Campos	Luis Ferrer y Vidal	Bartolomé Trías
Granada	Vicente Rodríguez Jiménez Jaén	Francisco Almendros Cobos	Eduardo Estelat
Guadalajara	Álvaro de Figueroa	José Antonio Ubierna	Daniel López y López
Guipuzcoa	Rafael Picavea	José Elósegui	Joaquín Ampuero y del Río
Huelva	Widower Marquese of Mondéjar	José María Jiménez Molina	José Valero Hervás
Huesca	José Almuzara	Juan Urrutia Zulueta	Andrés Martínez Vargas
Jaén	Nicolás Santa Olalla y Rojas	Ramón Melgares	Manuel Saénz de Quejada
León	Antonio Gullón del Río	Mariano Alonso Vázquez	Tomás Elorrieta
Lérida	José Llarí	José Agolet	Eduardo Auros
Logroño	Víctor del Valle Martínez	Santiago García Vaquero	Perfecto García Jalón
Lugo	Pegerte Pardo Velmonte	Francisco Javiér Vázquez	Mariano Martínez Fernández
Málaga	Manuel Egea	Ricardo Burguete	José Calfarena
Murcia	Diego González Conde	Juan Antonio Perea Martínez	José Álvarez Arranz
Navarra	Valentín Gayarre	José María Gastón	Tomás Domínguez Arévalo
Orense	Manuel Martín Salazar	Federico Carlos Bas	José Sabucedo Morales
Oviedo	Indalecio Corujedo	Adolfo González Posada	Benito Castro
Palencia	Félix de Abásolo y Zuazo	Luis Calderón	Ignacio de la Portilla
Pontevedra	Marquese of Santa María	Fernando Weyler	Eladio de Lema
Salamanca	Enrique Esperabé	Isidro Pérez Oliva	Fernando García Sánchez
Santander	Luis Hoyos Sáinz	Gregorio Eguilior Llaguno	Luis María de Aznar
Segovia	Francisco Tomilla	Mariano González Bartolomé	Rufino Cano Rueda
Sevilla	Count of Buines	Eduardo Sánchez Pizjuán	Carlos de la Lastra
Soria	Mateo Azpeitia	Tomás Allende	Faustino Archiclas
Tarragona	Joaquín Payá	José Elías de Molins	Juan Pich y Pon
Teruel	Antonio Royo Villanova	Justino Bernard	Francisco Ferrán Zapatero
Toledo	Álvaro de Figueroa	Arturo Taramona	Manuel Escrivá de Romaní
Valladolid	Enrique Gavilán	Julio Guillén	Manuel Núñez de Arce
Vizcaya	Constantino Careaga	Luis Salazar Tulia	Manuel Lezama
Zamora	Antonio Rodríguez Cid	Felipe González Gómez	Isidoro Rubio Gutiérrez
Zaragoza	José Guillén	Sixto Celorrio	Luis Pérez Cistúe

=== Universities ===
University	Deputy
Barcelona	José Daurella
Granada	José Martos de la Fuente
Madrid	Luis Ortega Morejón
Oviedo	Fermín Canella
Santiago	Miguel Gil Casares
Salamanca	Álvaro de Figueroa
Sevilla	Francisco Pagés
Valencia	Rafael Altemira
Valladolid	Felipe Clemente de Diego
Zaragoza	Ricardo Royo Villanova

=== Royal Academies ===
Academy	Deputy
Spanish	Emilio Cotarelo
History	Francisco Rafael de Uhagón
Fine Arts	José Joaquín Herrero
Exact Sciences	Daniel de Cortázar
Moral Sciences	Emilio Tovar y Roca
Medicine	Francisco Huertas Barrero

=== Economic Societies ===
Society	Deputy
Barcelona	Juan Garriga Masó
León	Federico de Echeverría
Madrid	José Varela de Limia
Sevilla	José Gómez Chaix
Valencia	Elías Tormo

=== Archbishoprics ===
Diocesis	Deputy
Burgos	Zacarías Martínez Núñez
Granada	Vicente Casanova y Marzol
Santiago	Juan José Solís y Fernández
Sevilla	Eustaquio Ilundain y Esteban
Tarragona	Isidoro Badía y Sarradel
Toledo	Enrique Reig Casanova
Valencia	Prudencio Melo y Alcalde
Valladolid	Remigio Gandásegui
Zaragoza	Rigoberto Doménech Valls
