= Government of Juan Bautista Aznar-Cabañas =

Government of Spain

Government of Aznar-Cabañas
- Government of Spain
- 1931
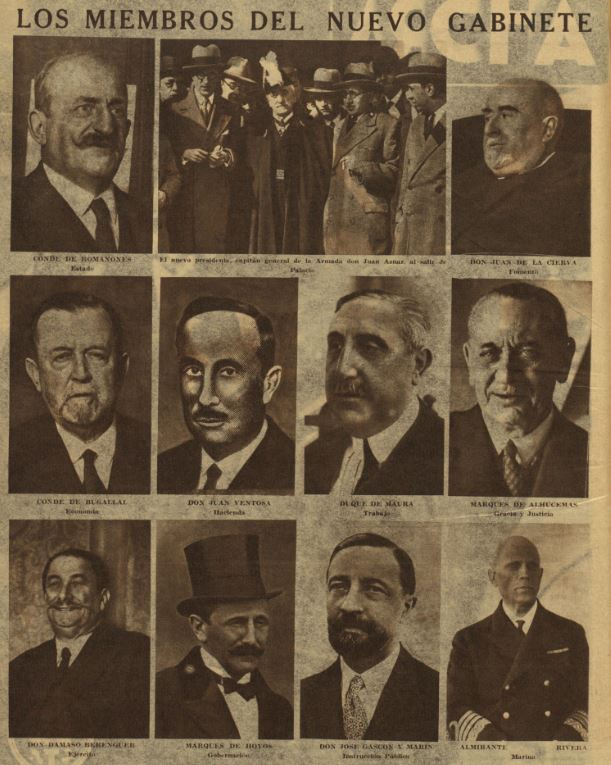
- Date formed: 18 February 1931
- Date dissolved: 14 April 1931

People and organisations
- King: Alfonso XIII
- Prime Minister: Juan Bautista Aznar-Cabañas
- No. of ministers: 10 (Note: Does not include the prime minister.)
- Total no. of members: 10
- Member parties: Liberal Party; Conservative Party; Regionalist League

History
- Predecessor: Berenguer
- Successor: Provisional

The government of Juan Bautista Aznar-Cabañas was formed on 18 February 1931 following the latter's appointment by King Alfonso XIII and his swearing-in the same day. It succeeded the Berenguer government and was the government of Spain from 18 February 1931 to 14 April 1931, a total of 56 days, or 1 month and 28 days.

The cabinet comprised members from the military, the Liberal Party, the Liberal-Conservative Party and the Regionalist League of Catalonia.

The government collapsed after their loss in the local elections of 1931 and the subsequent handing over of power to the republican-socialist "revolutionary committee" by Alfonso XIII.

== Formation ==
=== Overview ===
The Spanish Constitution of 1876 enshrined Spain as a semi-constitutional monarchy during the Restoration period, awarding the monarch—under the royal prerogative—the power to appoint government members (including the prime minister); the ability to grant or deny the decree of dissolution of the Cortes, or the adjournment of legislative sessions, to the incumbent or aspiring government that requested it; and the capacity to inform, inspect and ultimately control executive acts by granting or denying the signature of royal decrees; among others.

=== The search for a new prime minister ===
After the failure of Berenguer's government to celebrate the elections scheduled for 1 March 1931 due to the abstention of the main monarchist political parties (only the conservatives and the UMN accepted to participate). Having lost the confidence of the monarchist politicians and of his own ministers after this failure, Berenguer presented his resignation on 14 February 1931.

Following the advice of regionalist politician Francesc Cambó, the king nominated exiled liberal politician Santiago Alba, who refused the offer and recommended the king to form a government formed up by "constitutionalists" Following his advice, the king nominated constitutionalist José Sanchez Guerra, who accepted the offer. He sought to include members from the DLR in his government and reach a deal with the socialists, meeting with their jailed leaders in the Cárcel Modelo. They refused to cooperate and Sánchez-Guerra decided to decline the nomination. The king then nominated, following the advice of Sánchez Guerra, reformist politician Melquíades Álvarez, who declined after the refusal of the king to include general Manuel Goded in the government.

After reaching a deal with the main monarchist factions, Juan de la Cierva recommended Alfonso XIII to form a "government of monarchist concentration" presided by admiral Aznar-Cabañas. The king accepted with the condition that Berenguer remained as Minister of War.

== Council of Ministers ==
Image	Portfolio	Name	Political Party
	Prime minister	Juan Bautista Aznar-Cabañas	Military
	Minister of State	Count of Romanones	Liberal Party
	Minister of Grace and Justice	Manuel García Prieto	Liberal Party
	Minister of War	Dámaso Berenguer	Military
	Minister of the Navy	José Rivera Álvarez de Canero	Military
	Minister of Finance	Joan Ventosa i Calvell	Regionalist League of Catalonia
	Minister of the Governance	José María de Hoyos y Vinent	Liberal Conservative Party
	Minister of Public Instruction and Fine Arts	José Gascón y Marín	Liberal Conservative Party
	Minister of Development	Juan de la Cierva y Peñafiel	Liberal Conservative Party
	Minister of Labour and Social Foresight	Gabriel Maura Gamazo	Liberal Conservative Party
	Minister of National Economy	Gabino Bugallal Araújo	Liberal Conservative Party

== Sources ==
- Constitución de la Monarquía Española (PDF) (Constitution). Madrid Gazette (in Spanish). King of Spain. 30 June 1876.
- Calero, Antonio María (1987). "La prerrogativa regia en la Restauración: teoría y práctica (1875-1902)" (PDF). Revista de Estudios Políticos (in Spanish) (55). Madrid: Centre for Political and Constitutional Studies: 273–315. ISSN 0048-7694.
