= Fifth government of Antonio Maura =

5th government of Antonio Maura
- Government of Spain
- 1921–1922
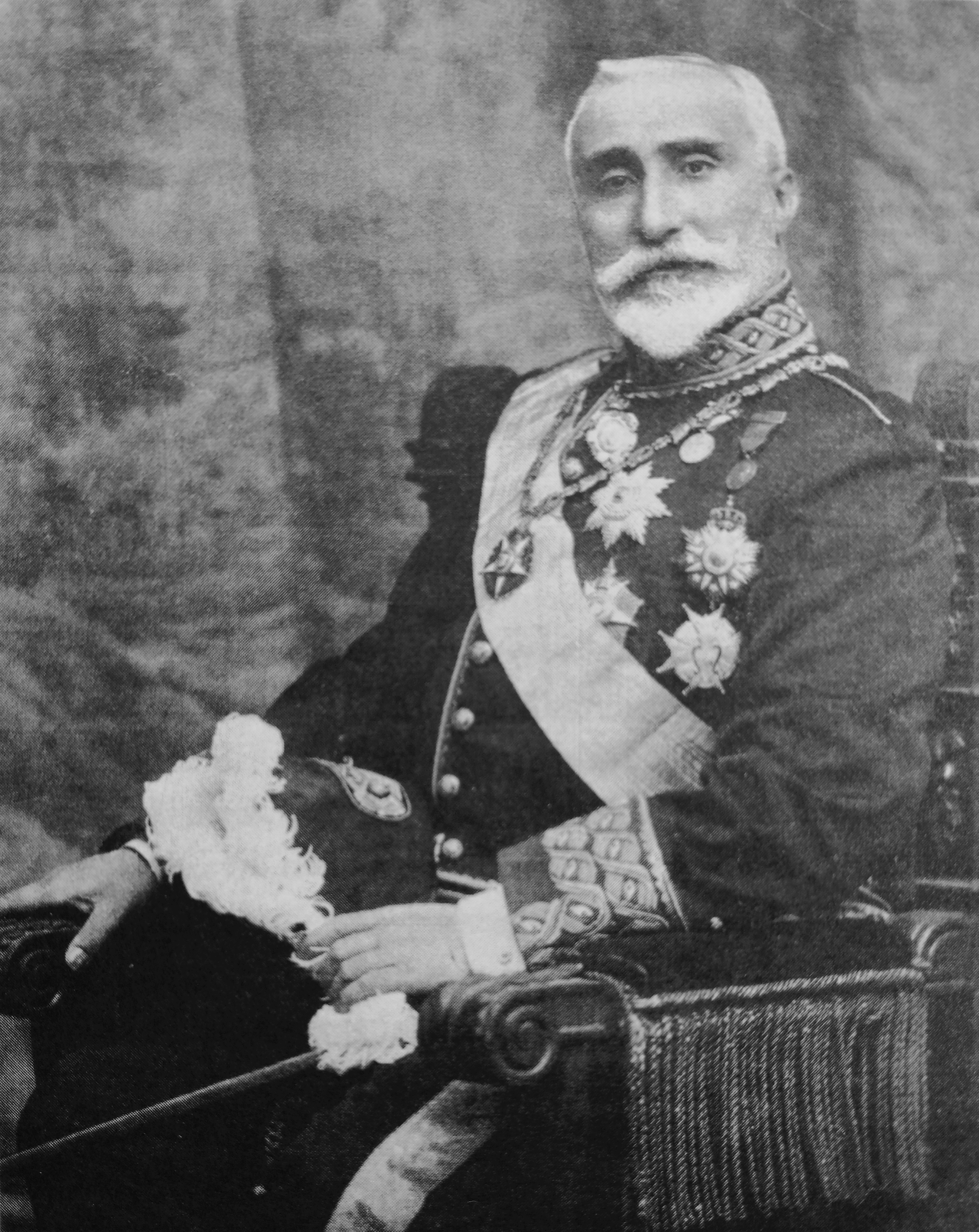
- Maura in the 1910s
- Date formed: 14 August 1921
- Date dissolved: 8 March 1922

People and organisations
- Monarch: Alfonso XIII
- Prime Minister: Antonio Maura
- No. of ministers: 9 (Note: Does not include the prime minister.)
- Total no. of members: 9
- Member party: Conservative; Liberal; Liberal Democrats; Catalan Regionalists
- Status in legislature: Majority (National unity government)
- Opposition party: Reformist
- Opposition leader: Melquíades Álvarez

History
- Predecessor: Allendesalazar II
- Successor: Sánchez-Guerra

The fifth government of Antonio Maura, was formed on 14 August 1921, following the latter's appointment as prime minister of Spain by King Alfonso XIII and his swearing-in that same day, as a result of the resignation en masse of the government on August 12. It succeeded the second government of Manuel Allendesalazar and was the government of Spain from 14 August 1921 to 8 March 1922, a total of 206 days, or 6 months and 22 days.

The cabinet, which was formed as a national unity government to confront the Rif War after the disastrous Battle of Annual, comprised members of the Conservative Party, the Liberal and the Liberal Democratic parties, the Catalan Regionalists, an independent politician, and a military officer.

It resigned due to political disagreements among the parties forming the government over the continuation of the suspension of constitutional guarantees in force since 1919, as well as disputes between several ministers concerning the upcoming military operations in the Rif War.

== Formation ==
=== Overview ===
The Spanish Constitution of 1876 enshrined Spain as a semi-constitutional monarchy during the Restoration period, awarding the monarch—under the royal prerogative—the power to appoint crown ministers (including the prime minister); the ability to grant or deny the decree of dissolution of the Cortes, or the adjournment of legislative sessions, to the incumbent or aspiring government that requested it; and the capacity to inform, inspect and ultimately control executive acts by granting or denying the signature of royal decrees; among others.

The monarch would play a key role in the turno system by appointing and dismissing governments, which would then organize elections to provide themselves with a parliamentary majority. As a result, governments during this period were dependent on royal confidence, which was frequently secured or lost based on the leaders' ability to guarantee the internal unity and parliamentary cohesion of their parties. In practice, the royal prerogative was not exercised freely by the monarch, but was carried out through the opening of a round of consultations—with the presidents of the chambers, the leaders of the main parties, the potential candidates and other notable figures—prior to government formation, or when prime ministers raised a matter of confidence to the monarch.

=== Cabinet crisis ===
At the Council of Ministers' meeting on 3 August 1921, the government agreed to request the Monarch to initiate consultations with the main political leaders on Moroccan policy and the future of the government. King Alfonso XIII held a round of consultations on 6–11 August 1921 to determine a solution to the political crisis arising from the defeat at the Battle of Annual.

Consultations; King of Spain
Date	Consultee	Office/position	Party
3 August 1921 (Note: Informal meeting; unofficial.)	The Marquess of Alhucemas	Leader of the Liberal Democrats; Prime Minister (former)	Liberal Democrat
6 August 1921	Antonio Maura	Leader of the Conservative Party; Prime Minister (former)	Conservative
8 August 1921	The Count of Romanones	Leader of the Liberal Party; Prime Minister (former)	Liberal
9 August 1921	Joaquín Sánchez de Toca	President of the Senate; Prime Minister (former)	Conservative
9 August 1921	José Sánchez-Guerra y Martínez	President of the Congress of Deputies	Conservative
11 August 1921	Santiago Alba y Bonifaz	Leader of Liberal Left	Liberal Left
Nominations
Outcome →	Nomination of Antonio Maura (Conservative) Accepted		

The outcome of the consultations led Alfonso XIII to entrust the formation of a new government to Antonio Maura, Leader of the Conservative Party. On August 12, Maura met with the main political leaders and on the morning of August 13, he announced the composition of the new government.

== Council of Ministers ==
The Council of Ministers was structured into the office for the prime minister and nine ministries.

← Maura V Government → (14 August 1921 – 8 March 1922)
Portfolio	Name	Party	Took office	Left office	Ref.
Prime Minister	Antonio Maura	Conservative	14 August 1921	8 March 1922	
Minister of State	Manuel González-Hontoria	Independent	14 August 1921	8 March 1922	
Minister of Grace and Justice	José Francos Rodríguez	Liberal Democrat	14 August 1921	8 March 1922	
Minister of War	Juan de la Cierva y Peñafiel	Conservative	14 August 1921	8 March 1922	
Minister of the Navy	The Marquess of Cortina	Liberal	14 August 1921	8 March 1922	
Minister of Finance (Note: Until Cambó's arrival at court on August 22, 1921, José Gómez-Acebo, Marquess of Cortina, Minister of the Navy, served as Acting Minister of Finance.)	Francesc Cambó	Catalan Regionalist	14 August 1921	8 March 1922	
Minister of Governance	The Count of Coello de Portugal	Military	14 August 1921	8 March 1922	
Minister of Public Instruction and Fine Arts	César Silió y Cortés	Conservative	14 August 1921	8 March 1922	
Minister of Development	José Maestre Pérez	Conservative	14 August 1921	8 March 1922	
Minister of Labour	Leopoldo Matos Massieu	Liberal	14 August 1921	8 March 1922	

== Bibliography ==
- Constitución de la Monarquía Española (PDF) (Constitution). Madrid Gazette (in Spanish). King of Spain. 30 June 1876.
- Soldevilla, Fernando (1921). El Año Político 1921 (in Spanish). Madrid: National Library of Spain.
- Soldevilla, Fernando (1922). El Año Político 1921 (in Spanish). Madrid: National Library of Spain.
- Calero, Antonio María (1987). "La prerrogativa regia en la Restauración: teoría y práctica (1875-1902)" (PDF). Revista de Estudios Políticos (in Spanish) (55). Madrid: Centre for Political and Constitutional Studies: 273–315. ISSN 0048-7694.
- Martorell Linares, Miguel Ángel (1997). "La crisis parlamentaria de 1913-1917. La quiebra del sistema de relaciones parlamentarias de la Restauración" (PDF). Revista de Estudios Políticos (in Spanish) (96). Madrid: Centre for Political and Constitutional Studies: 137–161. ISSN 0048-7694.
- Martínez Ruiz, Enrique; Maqueda Abreu, Consuelo; De Diego, Emilio (1999). Atlas histórico de España. El Reinado de Alfonso XIII (1902-1931) (in Spanish). Vol. 2. Bilbao: Ediciones KAL. pp. 121–132. ISBN 9788470903502.
- González, María Jesús (2002). "'Neither God Nor Monster': Antonio Maura and the Failure of Conservative Reformism in Restoration Spain (1893–1923)" (PDF). European History Quarterly. 32 (3). SAGE Publications: 307–334. doi:10.1177/0269142002032003059. ISSN 0265-6914.

Preceded by Allendesalazar II	Government of Spain; 1921–1922	Succeeded by Sánchez-Guerra
