= Provincial Statute of 1925 (Spain) =

Act passed by the Spanish government

The Provincial Statute of 1925 (in Spanish: Estatuto Provincial de 1925) was the regulation of the provincial deputation in Spain, promulgated on March 21, 1925, by the Dictatorship of Primo de Rivera. It responded to the abandonment of the initial idea of “healthy regionalism” by the dictator, which was replaced by a belligerent Spanish nationalism. Thus, the approval of the Provincial Statute led to the dissolution of the Commonwealth of Catalonia, which had already been severely depleted of its powers since the approval of the Municipal Statute of 1924. On the other hand, as the planned elections were never held, the provincial deputies were appointed by the civil governors and the deputations functioned as a kind of delegations of the Central Administration.

== Background ==
At first, it seemed that Primo de Rivera supported what he called “healthy regionalism”, and a few days after the coup d'état, he commissioned the Basque provincial deputations to draw up a draft statute, a task which the Provincial Deputation of Guipúzcoa fulfilled and presented at the end of December 1923. However, the Provincial Deputation of Vizcaya, which was dominated by the Monarchist Action League, was opposed, and the project was abandoned.

On October 12, 1923, Primo de Rivera declared that he proposed to suppress “the 49 small provincial administrations”, replacing them with 10, 12, or 14 regions endowed with “all that it is possible to grant within the unity of the land”. This policy was confirmed with the offer made by the Dictatorship to the conservative Galician nationalists of a Galician Commonwealth, in exchange for collaboration with the regime's policy. A similar offer was made to the Valencian and Aragonese regionalists. In March 1924 in Santiago de Compostela, the preliminary draft of the Galician Commonwealth made by Vicente Risco and Antón Losada Diéguez was approved, but by then the "regionalist" impulse of the Dictatorship had disappeared.

On January 13, 1924, Primo de Rivera decreed the dissolution of the provincial councils, with the exception of the provincial councils of the Basque Country and Navarre, as he had already done with the city councils three months earlier. The civil governors, who were mostly military, were in charge of appointing their new members from among liberal professionals, major taxpayers, and directors of cultural, industrial, and professional corporations. Likewise, the new deputations were to report on the operational problems they detected and to propose remedies.

The appointment at the head of the Catalan deputations of prominent Spaniards, who were mostly from the National Monarchist Union, as had already happened with the city councils, provoked the disaffection of the members of the Lliga Regionalista led by Josep Puig i Cadafalch, who had initially believed in the regionalist goodwill of Primo de Rivera.

Primo de Rivera entrusted the task of reforming the legal-administrative system of city councils and provincial councils to the young lawyer José Calvo Sotelo, a conservative politician from the Maurist party, whom he placed at the head of the General Directorate of Local Administration. Calvo Sotelo appointed a team of ex-Maurists and right-wing Catholics, such as José María Gil Robles, Count Vallellano, Josep Pi i Suñer, Miquel Vidal i Guardiola, and Luis Jordana de Pozas, who collaborated in the drafting of the Municipal Statute of 1924 and the Provincial Statute of 1925.

== The Statute ==
According to Eduardo González Calleja, the Provincial Statute promulgated on March 21, 1925 “was a faithful reflection of the change in Primo de Rivera's attitude from the initial promotion of healthy regionalism to his final hostility towards any threat to Spanish centralist nationalism”. This was reflected in the unofficial note that accompanied the promulgation of the Provincial Statute, in which the Commonwealth of Catalonia was mentioned as an example of “misunderstood” regionalism:

To reconstruct the region from the Power, to reinforce its personality to exalt the differentiated pride between some and others is to contribute to undo the great work of national unity. It is to initiate the disintegration, for which there is always stimulus in the pride or selfishness of men. [...] We have gone through a trial of this special regionalism with the Commonwealth of Catalonia, and it has led to such a degree of misunderstanding of the predominance of regional sentiment that, contrary to what was said that it was coexistent with that of the Patria Grande, we have seen it gallop unbridled towards nationalism and separatism, causing the Catalans who love Spain to spend hours of bitterness and humiliation, and all Spaniards to feel uneasy and disheartened.

The Statute “was divided into three books dealing, respectively, with the provincial organization (province, civil governors, provincial deputations, provincial administration, provincial legal system and administrative system of the Canary Islands), the provincial treasury (budgets, provincial revenues, provincial collection, and accounting) and the region, the latter significantly with only one title”. Eduardo González Calleja emphasizes that for the first time, the province was defined as a local administration, “favoring a timid process of supervised corporate provincialization (as opposed to the previous rigid centralism) as a priority criterion of administrative operation”.

The Statute made it clear that the provincial organization depended on the municipalities, and that they could modify it, with the agreement of one-third of the local entities and two-thirds of the town councils with two-thirds of the provincial population. Half of the provincial deputies, whose number was reduced so that the deputation would be a management body and not a kind of parliament, would be directly elected by universal suffrage and the other half by the councilors of the municipalities.

The Statute provided for the creation of regions, but the process was complicated, as the approval of three-quarters of the municipalities affected and representing the same proportion of electors was required, and it ultimately depended on the approval of the government, which was responsible for drafting the final project. It was what Eduardo González Calleja has called “regionalism from above”.

== Application ==
The Statute increased the administrative and financial autonomy of the provincial deputations, although their income depended on the taxes ceded by the State and the resources ceded by the municipalities. As the elections provided for in the Statute were never held, the provincial deputies were appointed by the civil governors, so the deputations functioned as “a mere appendix of the Central Administration”, states González Calleja.

== Bibliography ==
- Barrio Alonso, Ángeles (2004). La modernización de España (1917-1939). Política y sociedad [The modernization of Spain (1917-1939). Politics and society]. Madrid: Síntesis. ISBN 84-9756-223-2.
- Ben-Ami, Shlomo (2012) [1983]. El cirujano de hierro. La dictadura de Primo de Rivera (1923-1930) [The iron surgeon. The Dictatorship of Primo de Rivera (1923-1930)]. Barcelona: RBA. ISBN 978-84-9006-161-9.
- González Calleja, Eduardo (2005). La España de Primo de Rivera. La modernización autoritaria 1923-1930 [The Spain of Primo de Rivera. Authoritarian modernization 1923-1930]. Madrid: Alianza Editorial. ISBN 84-206-4724-1.
