= Republican Federation (Spain) =

Defunct Spanish political party

Republican Federation Federación Republicana
- Leader: Bernardo Giner de los Ríos; Alejandro Lerroux; Roberto Castrovido; Manuel Marraco Ramón; Marcelino Domingo
- Founded: 1917
- Dissolved: 1923
- Ideology: Republicanism
- Political position: Centre-left

The Republican Federation (Spanish: Federación Republicana, UR) was a Spanish republican party during the Spanish Restoration period, founded in 1917 by Bernardo Giner de los Ríos, Alejandro Lerroux (Radical Republican Party), Roberto Castrovido, Manuel Marraco Ramón and Marcelino Domingo (Catalan Republican Party). It aimed for agrarian reform and tackling the issues of labour, hunger, education, the tax system, the army, international politics, and the autonomous regions, with it being in favor of granting autonomy to Catalonia.

== Bibliography ==
- Serrano Lahoz, Manuel (2020). Los partidos republicanos durante la Restauración (1874-1931) (PDF) (BA thesis) (in Spanish). University of Zaragoza.
