= Maurists =

Maurists may refer to:

- Congregation of Saint Maur, a congregation of French Benedictines
- Maurism, a conservative political movement in Spain around the figure of Antonio Maura
- Maurist Party, the splinter faction of the Spanish Conservative Party during the Restoration led by Antonio Maura
