= Gamacists =

Gamacists Gamacistas
- Leader: Germán Gamazo; Antonio Maura
- Founded: October 1898
- Dissolved: 6 November 1902
- Split from: Liberal Party
- Merged into: Conservative Party
- Ideology: Liberalism; Conservative liberalism Monarchism
- Political position: Centre

The Gamacists (Spanish: Gamacistas) were a political faction within the Liberal Party led by Germán Gamazo. They split from the party in October 1898 following the Ribot scandal—a controversy involving Cádiz governor and Gamazo's ally Pascual Ribot—which Gamazo attributed to an internal conspiration within the Liberal party to get rid of him as Development minister. Among its members were future prime minister and Conservative leader Antonio Maura, son-in-law of Gamazo, as well as other notorious Liberal legislators.

After Gamazo's death in November 1901, it eventually merged into the Conservative Party of Francisco Silvela in November 1902.

== Bibliography ==
- Soldevilla, Fernando (1903). El Año Político 1902 (in Spanish). Madrid: National Library of Spain.
- Hidalgo Marín, Inés Sofía (1995). University of Valladolid (ed.). "La familia Gamazo: elite castellana en la restauración (1874-1923)". Investigaciones históricas: Época moderna y contemporánea (in Spanish) (15): 107–118. ISSN 0210-9425.
- Cano García, Juan Antonio (2004). Poder, política y partidos en Valladolid durante la Restauración (Thesis) (in Spanish). Valladolid: University of Valladolid. pp. 328–381.
- Calzada del Amo, Esther (2011). Germán Gamazo, 1840-1901: poder político y redes sociales en la Restauración (in Spanish). Madrid: Marcial Pons Historia. ISBN 9788492820382.
