= Francisco Aparicio y Ruiz =

Spanish lawyer and politician

Francisco Aparicio Ruiz
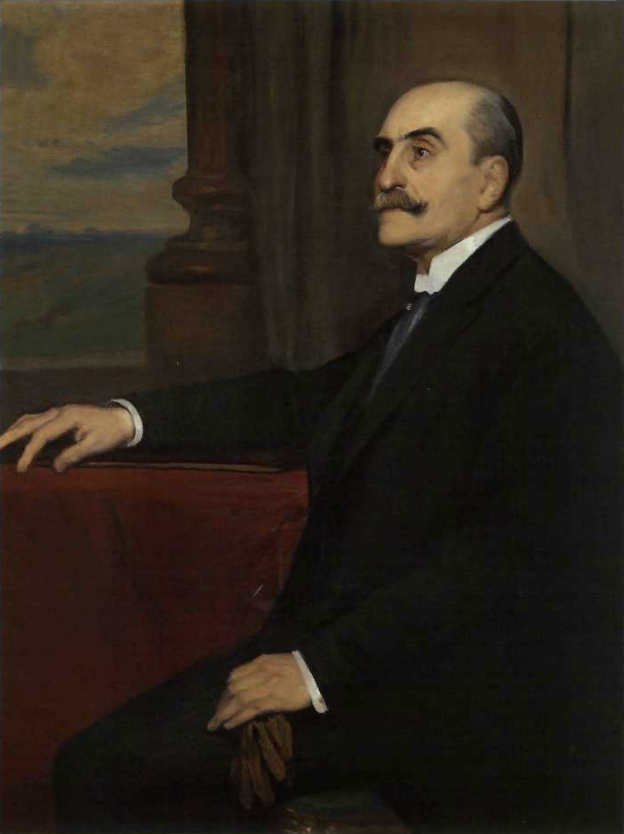
- oil painting of Francisco Aparicio Ruiz by unknown artist
- Born: 17 July 1852; Burgos, Spain
- Died: 6 November 1936 (aged 84); Burgos, Spain
- Occupations: Lawyer and politician
- Years active: 1880s-1920s

Minister of Public Instruction and Fine Arts of Spain
- In office 31 March – 13 August 1921
- Monarch: Alfonso XIII
- Prime Minister: Manuel Allendesalazar
- Preceded by: Tomás Montejo y Rica
- Succeeded by: Cesár Silió

Personal details
- Party: Conservative Party (Spain)

Francisco Aparicio y Ruiz (17 July 1852 in Burgos — 6 November 1932 in Burgos) was a Spanish lawyer and politician.

He studied and was educated in Madrid. In his youth he was a director of his local newspaper, Caput Castellae. He was a member of the Conservative Party, provincial deputy for Burgos in 1888, president of the Provincial Delegation of Burgos in 1890, Director General of Local Administration in 1899 and Deputy Secretary of Finance in 1900, Regional Commissioner of the Treasury in 1918 and Governor of Madrid in 1919. He was a member of the Congress for Burgos from 1891 to 1923 and also served as Vice-President of Congress from 1901 to 1910. He was Minister of Public Instruction between 13 March and 14 August 1921 in the government presided over by Manuel Allendesalazar Muñoz and reign of Alfonso XIII.

Further details about his life and death are unknown.
