= Juan de la Cierva y Peñafiel =

Spanish politician and lawyer

The Most Excellent Don Juan de la Cierva y Peñafiel
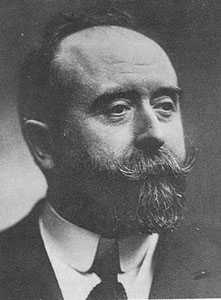

Minister of Public Instruction and Fine Arts of Spain
- In office 16 December 1904 – 23 June 1905
- Monarch: Alfonso XIII
- Prime Minister: Marcelo Azcárraga Palmero; Raimundo Fernández Villaverde
- Preceded by: Lorenzo Domínguez Pascual
- Succeeded by: Andres Mellado

Minister of Governance of Spain
- In office 25 January 1907 – 21 October 1909
- Monarch: Alfonso XIII
- Prime Minister: Antonio Maura
- Preceded by: Count of Romanones
- Succeeded by: Segismundo Moret

Minister of Finance of Spain
- In office 15 April – 20 July 1909
- Monarch: Alfonso XIII
- Prime Minister: Antonio Maura
- Preceded by: José Gómez-Acebo
- Succeeded by: Gabino Bugallal

Minister of Development of Spain
- In office 12 March – 13 August 1921
- Monarch: Alfonso XIII
- Prime Minister: Manuel Allendesalazar
- Preceded by: Luis Espada Guntín
- Succeeded by: José Maestre Pérez
- In office 18 February – 14 April 1931
- Monarch: Alfonso XIII
- Prime Minister: Juan Bautista Aznar
- Preceded by: José Estrada y Estrada
- Succeeded by: Álvaro de Albornoz

Minister of War of Spain
- In office 3 November 1917 – 22 March 1918
- Monarch: Alfonso XIII
- Prime Minister: Manuel García Prieto
- Preceded by: José Marina Vega
- Succeeded by: José Marina Vega
- In office 14 August 1921 – 8 March 1922
- Monarch: Alfonso XIII
- Prime Minister: Antonio Maura
- Preceded by: Luis de Marichalar y Monreal
- Succeeded by: José Olaguer Feliú

Personal details
- Born: March 11, 1864 Mula, Murcia
- Died: January 11, 1938 (aged 73) Madrid
- Party: Partido Liberal-Conservador
- Education: Universidad de Madrid
- Profession: Lawyer and politician

Juan de la Cierva y Peñafiel (March 11, 1864 - January 11, 1938) was a Spanish politician and lawyer, who served during the reign of Alfonso XIII as Minister of Public Instruction and Fine Arts, of the Interior, of War, and of Finance and Development, and in the last government of the monarchy as Minister of Development.

Cierva was born Mula, Murcia, the son of lawyer and notary public Juan de la Cierva y Soto. He married a daughter of the banker Eleuterio Peñafiel, who was active between 1860 and 1896.

He graduated in law from the University of Madrid, beginning his political career with the Spanish Partido Liberal-Conservador (English: "Liberal-Conservative Party") as a councillor in 1895, and became the Mayor of Murcia and provincial leader of the Conservatives. In 1896, he was given writ to stand as a deputy congressman for the region of his birth, but failed to be elected.

During the Spanish Civil War he took refuge in the embassy of Norway. Because there was no medicine there, and such a deprivation of provisions, he contracted tuberculosis and suffered severe conditions, dying on 11 January 1938.

== Politician ==
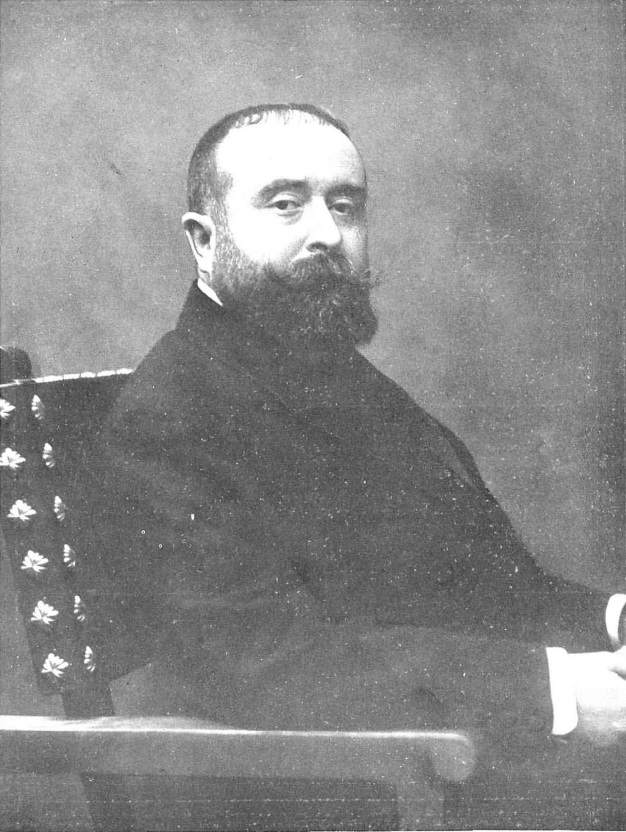
Juan de la Cierva, photograph by Kaulak

From 1902, Cierva built a network of political secret contacts, who maintained absolute power of the people, in exchange for political loyalty to the royal family. This time is known in Murcia as ciervismo. Cierva's political hegemony was strained by the class struggle and the establishment of the Spanish Second Republic.

He was the Minister for Education and the Minister for Arts December 16, 1904, and April 8, 1905, respectively, in separate governments presided by Marcelo Azcárraga Palmero and Raimundo Fernández Villaverde.

Between January 25, 1907, and October 21, 1909, he was the Minister of the Interior. He was also Minister of War twice: from 3 November 1917 to March 22, 1918, where he was in the cabinet of Manuel García Prieto, and from 14 August 1921 to March 8, 1922 in Antonio Maura's government.

Under this government, he was also the Finance Minister, from April 15 to 20 July 1919.
