= Roberto Castrovido =

Spanish journalist and politician

Roberto Castrovido Sanz (5 January 1864 – 1941) was a Spanish journalist and politician who served as legislator in the Congress of Deputies a number of times during the Restoration period between 1912 and 1920, and again during the Second Spanish Republic between 1931 and 1933.

== Bibliography ==
- Angosto Vélez, Pedro Luis (2019). Ministry of Justicia (ed.). Roberto Castrovido, de las luchas por la democracia al exilio mexicano. Vida y artículos (1864-1941) (in Spanish). Madrid. ISBN 9788477874935. OCLC 1130109399.
- Blanco y Sánchez, Rufino (1925). Tip. de la "Revista de archivos, bibliotecas y museos" (ed.). Elementos de literatura española e hispanoamericana (in Spanish). Madrid.
