= Monarchist Action League =

Monarchist Action League Liga de Acción Monárquica
- Founded: 1919
- Dissolved: 1931
- Ideology: Monarchism; Spanish nationalism Conservatism

The Monarchist Action League (Spanish: Liga de Acción Monárquica, LAM) was a political party during the Spanish Restoration period, that existed between 1919 and 1931. It was founded in the Basque Country by supporters of Alfonso XIII's monarchy to try to counteract the political hegemony that the Basque Nationalist Communion had at the time.
