= Conservative Party (Spain) =

1876–1931 political party in Spain

Liberal Conservative Party Partido Liberal-Conservador
- Leaders: Antonio Cánovas; Arsenio Martínez-Campos; Francisco Silvela; Antonio Maura; Eduardo Dato; José Sánchez-Guerra
- Founded: 1876
- Dissolved: 1931
- Preceded by: Moderate Party; Liberal Union
- Merged into: Popular Party
- Ideology: Monarchism; Centralization; Liberal conservatism
- Political position: Centre-right

The Conservative Party (Spanish: Partido Conservador), officially the Liberal Conservative Party (Spanish: Partido Liberal-Conservador, PLC) and colloquially the Conservatives (Spanish: Conservadores), was a Spanish political party founded in 1876 by Antonio Cánovas del Castillo.

== History ==
=== Foundation ===
The "Conservative" label referred to the dominant political ideas in Spain at the time, particularly regarding matters of state. The political formation of Spain was shaped by Antonio Cánovas del Castillo, at the request of Alfonso XII of Spain, who assumed the crown following the failure of the First Spanish Republic. The Conservative Party brought together a varied group of people, from the supporters of Isabel II of Spain before the Republic to the members of other groups Cánovas had formed. Its existence was linked to Cánovas himself and on his death in 1897 it was kept going by Francisco Silvela.

In 1885, the party signed the Pact of El Pardo with the Liberal Party of Sagasta, in which the parties agreed to alternate (turno) in power after the death of Alfonso XII of Spain. The pact was guaranteed by the caciques networks right across Spain in both parties and was intended to keep out of power radical socialist, anarchist or republican parties that wished to destroy the monarchy.

The party was founded by Antonio Cánovas del Castillo at the end of the Revolutionary Sexennial, during the period 1874–1876. It was called "liberal" because of the system of State it defended – always complying with the 1876 Constitution that Cánovas himself had drafted – and "conservative" because of the type of ideas that were to prevail in Spain during managing State affairs. In its early years, the members of the Conservative Party came from old formations that had existed during the reign of Isabella II: an important part came from the extinct Liberal Union, while another part came from the also extinct Moderate Party. Cánovas del Castillo dominated the Spanish political situation for several years, until the 1881 elections.

In 1884, the Catholic Union party joined the party.

After the assassination of Cánovas del Castillo by an anarchist in 1897, Francisco Silvela took over the leadership of the party.

=== Antonio Maura (1905–13) ===
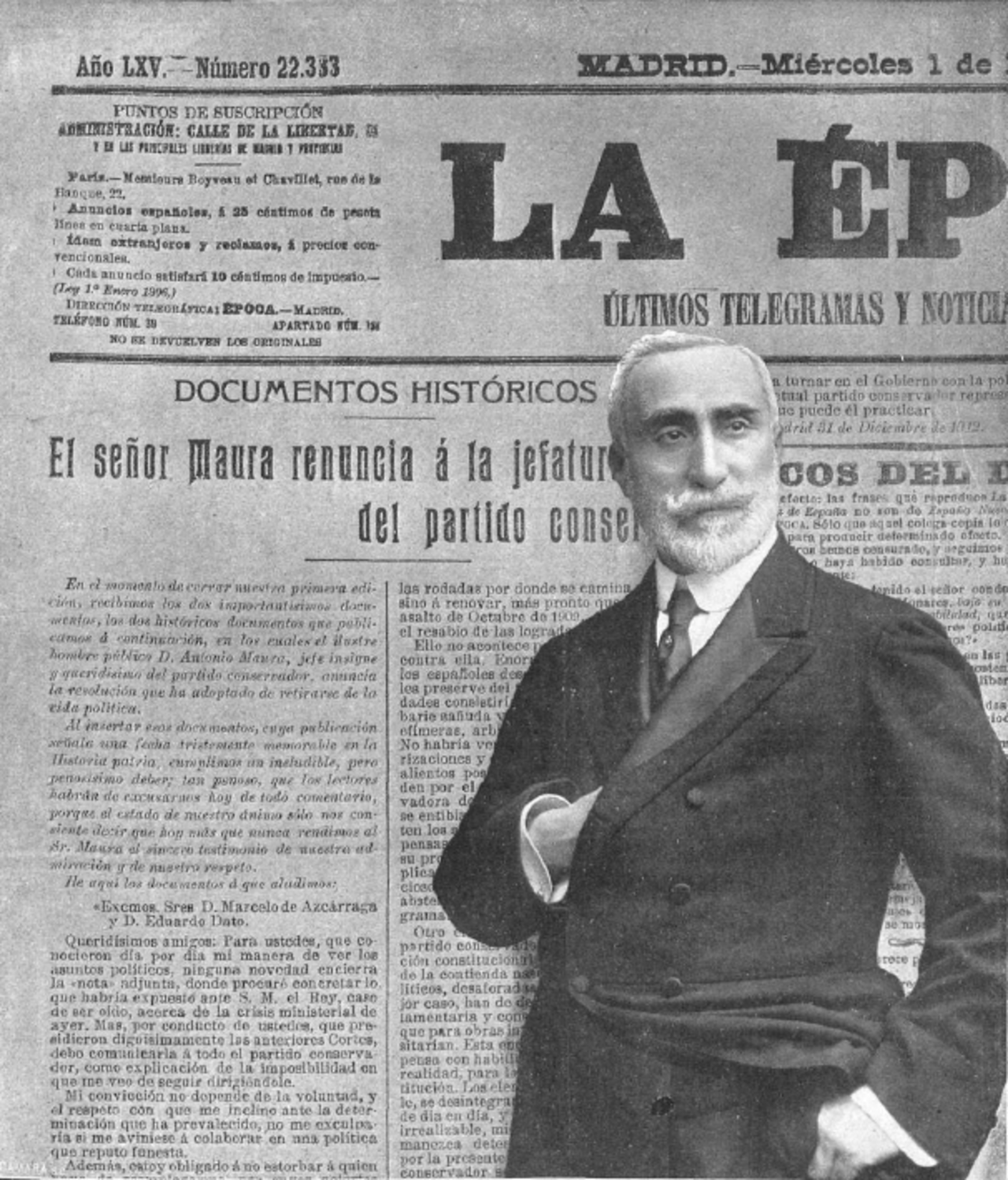
Retirada de Maura, by Kaulak

After the death of Francisco Silvela in 1905, the Conservative Party set out again to find a strong and consensual leader, something that was very difficult within the party and in the Cacique system of Spain, where in each region a politician dominated. Finally, the new leader was the Mallorcan Antonio Maura Montaner, whom Silvela himself had designated as his successor, and who would be president of the Council of Ministers in different stages, the most fruitful and extensive being the so-called "long government" of 1907–1909. Paradoxically, Antonio Maura had originally been a member of the Liberal Party, although he split from it together with the supporters of Germán Gamazo Calvo – the so-called gamacistas – and ended up joining the Conservative Party.

In 1903, Alfonso XIII had already entrusted him with the presidency of the government. He then organised the king's first official trip to Barcelona, which was a success for the figure of the monarch, although Maura was injured in an attack. In 1904, his confrontation with the king made him leave the government. He returned to power in 1907, after the elections held that year, and during the following years he carried out extensive legislative work: Electoral Law, Strike Law, Sunday Rest Law, creation of the National Institute of Social Security (INP), modernization of the Navy, and the Local Administration Reform Bill.

It also promoted rapprochement with France and Great Britain. However, during his government, serious problems of public order occurred, such as the Tragic Week (Spain) in 1909. The subsequent shooting of Francisco Ferrer, unjustly accused of being the main instigator of the Barcelona incidents, provoked a very harsh campaign against Maura – posters even appeared in Barcelona with the slogan "Maura No" – and marked the end of the great popularity he had enjoyed until then. The crisis provoked by the shooting of Ferrer Guardia ended up leading to his fall in October 1909. In 1913, he left the party leadership, although he would still hold an important position in the party.

=== Eduardo Dato (1913–21) ===
In 1913, the Galician lawyer Eduardo Dato Iradier accepted the leadership of the Conservative Party and broke with Antonio Maura when he accepted the task of forming the government. This meant the fracture of the Conservative Party between the supporters of one and the other: the Maurists and the Dadatists or suitable ones, and a crisis that was aggravated by the loss of the 1916 elections. Dato would again preside over the government in 1917, yielding to the Military Defence Boards and vigorously repressing the August general strike. Maura would still return to the leadership of the nation's government, agreeing to preside over the Council of Ministers again in 1918, with the formation of a cabinet of national concentration with Maurist and Dada militants, but also with members of the Liberal Party. That context, with the First World War, the general strike of 1917 and the Russian Revolution, made it advisable to turn again to the old conservative politician. This Council of Ministers drew up the new Labour Day Law (eight hours) and gave way to another headed by Joaquín Sánchez de Toca, which gave rise to the Royal Decree that put it into effect. Both cabinets were supported by Eduardo Dato and his like-minded deputies, but the deputy for Murcia and minister Juan de la Cierva y Peñafiel gained power within the conservative movement, and he opposed Sánchez de Toca's acceptance of the Joint Commission of Workers and Employers that tried to put an end to gun-running in Catalonia.

In 1920, Dato returned to power continuing his work of social reformism - he created the Ministry of Labour, for which he chose Carlos Cañal - although he repressed with expeditious methods - also defended by Juan de la Cierva and Peñafiel - the anarchist pistolerism in Barcelona. He was the promoter of the Law on Accidents at Work and founded the Alfonso XIII Institute. Dato was assassinated at the Puerta de Alcalá in Madrid in 1921, when he was once again President of the Council of Ministers.

=== The final years (1923–31) ===
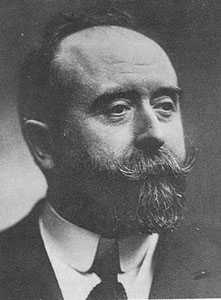
Juan de la Cierva Peñafiel

With the coup by General Miguel Primo de Rivera in September 1923 and the subsequent establishment of the Dictatorship, the Conservative Party and its leaders were distanced from political life until 1930, when the party again became part of the last government of the monarchy, presided over by Admiral Juan Bautista Aznar, who put Juan de la Cierva y Peñafiel at the head of the Ministry of Public Works in 1930–1931, already considered the leader of the Conservatives. Silvela, Maura and Dato had died; Sánchez de Toca declined to form part of the last governments of Alfonso XIII and even declined to be prime minister; and other politicians of liberal-conservative origin such as Miguel Maura and Santiago Alba had joined the ranks of the conservative republicans.

The results of the municipal elections of April 1931 reflected that neither the Liberal nor the Conservative Party had support among the population, and that their power was more artificial than real. With the proclamation of the Second Republic on April 14, 1931, Juan de la Cierva y Peñafiel tried certainly to prevent Alfonso XIII from going into exile, but it was useless.

The Conservative Party disappeared shortly after the proclamation of the Republic.

== Electoral performance ==
=== Restoration Cortes ===
Election	Popular vote			Seats	Leader	Outcome
Election	Votes	%	#	Seats	Leader	Outcome
1876			#1	317 / 391	Antonio Cánovas del Castillo	PLC majority
1879			#1	295 / 392	Antonio Cánovas del Castillo	PLC majority
1881			#2	62 / 392	Antonio Cánovas del Castillo	PLF majority
1884			#1	311 / 393	Antonio Cánovas del Castillo	PLC majority
1886			#2	83 / 395	Antonio Cánovas del Castillo	PL majority
1891			#1	251 / 401	Antonio Cánovas del Castillo	PLC majority
1893			#2	70 / 401	Antonio Cánovas del Castillo	PL majority
1896			#1	272 / 401	Antonio Cánovas del Castillo	PLC majority
1898			#4	9 / 401	Carlos O'Donnell	PL majority
1899	Conservative Union			11 / 402	Francisco Silvela	UC–PLC majority
1901			#2	84 / 402	Francisco Silvela	PL majority
1903			#1	219 / 403	Francisco Silvela	PLC majority
1905			#2	107 / 404	Antonio Maura	PL majority
1907	1,842,634	60.0	#1	249 / 404	Antonio Maura	PLC majority
1910		21.9	#2	115 / 404	Antonio Maura	PL majority
1914			1	193 / 408	Eduardo Dato	PLC minority
1916			#2	88 / 409	Eduardo Dato	PL–LD majority
1918			#1	98 / 409	Eduardo Dato	PM–PLC–LD–Lib–IL–LRC national unity
1919			#2	94 / 409	Eduardo Dato	PLC minority
1920			#1	174 / 409	Eduardo Dato	PLC minority
1923			#2	93 / 409	José Sánchez Guerra	LD–Lib–IL–PR coalition

== Party leaders ==
- 1876–97 Antonio Cánovas del Castillo
- 1897–1905 Francisco Silvela
- 1905–13 Antonio Maura
- 1913–21 Eduardo Dato e Iradier
- 1921–23 José Sánchez-Guerra (unofficially)
- 1923–30 Vacant (dictatorship of Miguel Primo de Rivera)
- 1930–31 Gabino Bugallal

== See also ==
- Liberal Party (Spain, 1880)
- Political System of the Restoration (Spain)
