= Juan Bautista Aznar-Cabañas =

Spanish Prime Minister (1860–1933)

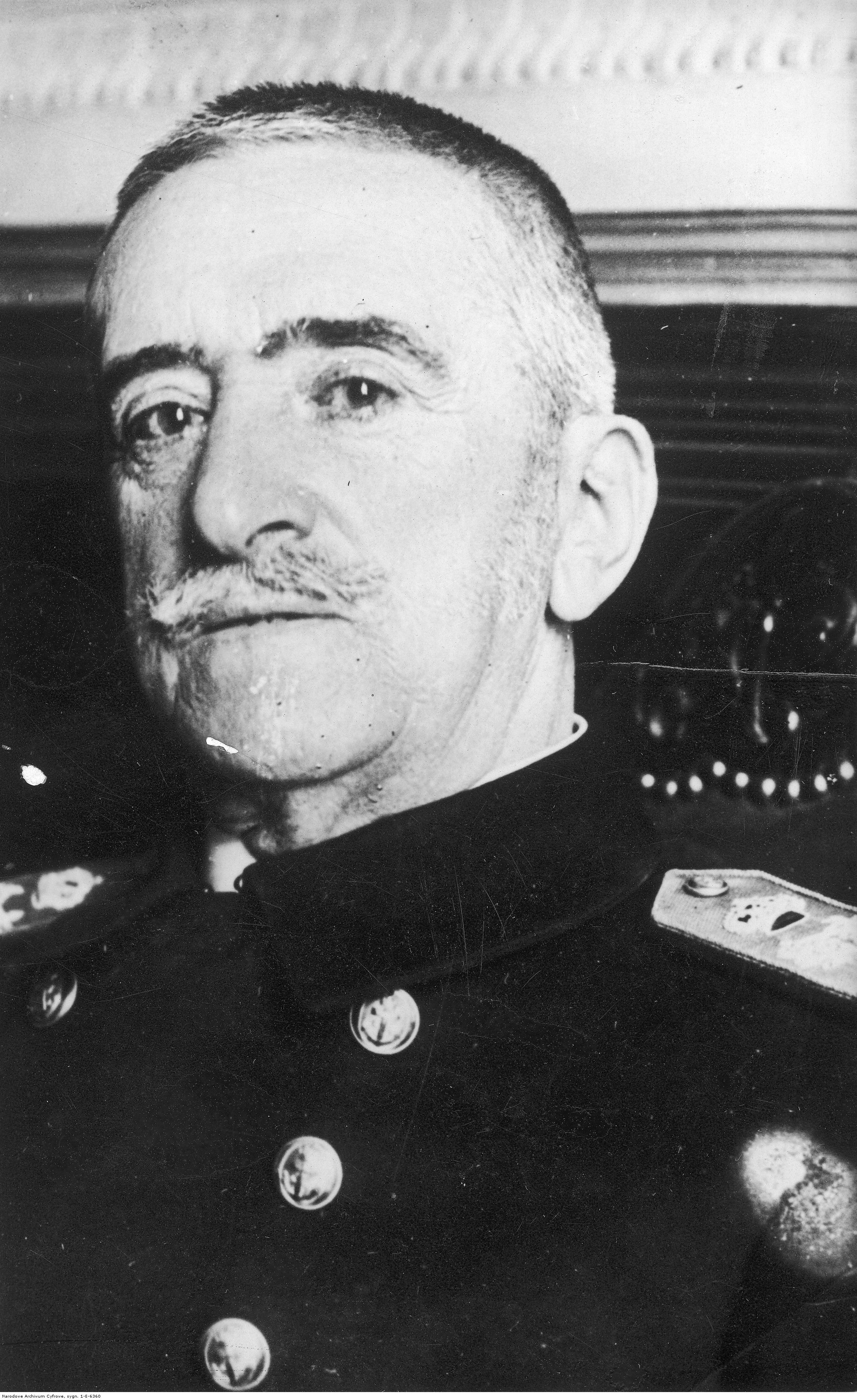

Prime Minister of Spain
- In office 18 February 1931 – 14 April 1931
- Monarch: Alfonso XIII
- Preceded by: Dámaso Berenguer
- Succeeded by: Niceto Alcalá-Zamora

Minister of the Navy
- In office 16 February 1923 – 15 September 1923
- Prime Minister: Manuel García Prieto
- Preceded by: Luis Silvela Casado
- Succeeded by: Gabriel Antón Iboleón

Personal details
- Born: Juan Bautista Aznar-Cabañas; 5 September 1860 A Coruña, Spain
- Died: 19 February 1933 (aged 72) Madrid, Spain
- Spouse: Rafaela Barrantes Abascal
- Children: 2
- Awards: Order of the Golden Fleece

Military service
- Allegiance: Spain
- Branch/service: Spanish Navy
- Rank: Captain general of the Navy

Admiral Juan Bautista Aznar-Cabañas (Note: He is referred to in Spanish sources both as Aznar-Cabañas and as Aznar y Cabañas.) (5 September 1860 – 19 February 1933) was the Prime Minister of Spain from the resignation of Dámaso Berenguer y Fusté on to the deposition of King Alfonso XIII and the proclamation of the Spanish Second Republic on 14 April 1931.

An admiral of the Spanish Navy, honorary captain general of the Navy since 1928, he was made Prime Minister at a time of intense crisis, in the first months of 1931, when the monarchy was on the verge of falling under popular pressure for a republic. His attempts to save the crown failed, and King Alfonso had to go to exile.

== Political background ==
In Admiral Aznar-Cabañas' government, there were disagreements between absolutist and constitutional monarchists. The champion of the latter was conde de Romanones Álvaro de Figueroa y Torres, who was in prison. Meanwhile, Minister of the Interior José María de Hoyos y Vinent de la Torre O'Neill acted as a middleman between the factions.

Initially the constitutionalists tried to make a deal with the Republicans. After failing to reach an accommodation with them, and after the Republicans won the municipal elections, the constitutionalists recommended that the King vacate the country.

In April 1931, following the proclamation of the Second Spanish Republic, there was fear about the reaction of the armed forces of the Spanish Kingdom.

However, Admiral Aznar-Cabañas' casual comment: "Do you think it was a little thing what happened yesterday, that Spain went to bed as a monarchy and rose as a republic?" became instantly famous, going quickly around Madrid and around Spain, calming public opinion and making the people and the military accept the fact. Republicans within the Spanish Armed forces were a minority, but so were pro-monarchist reactionaries, the majority within the military were at first indifferent.
