= Santiago Alba y Bonifaz =

Spanish politician

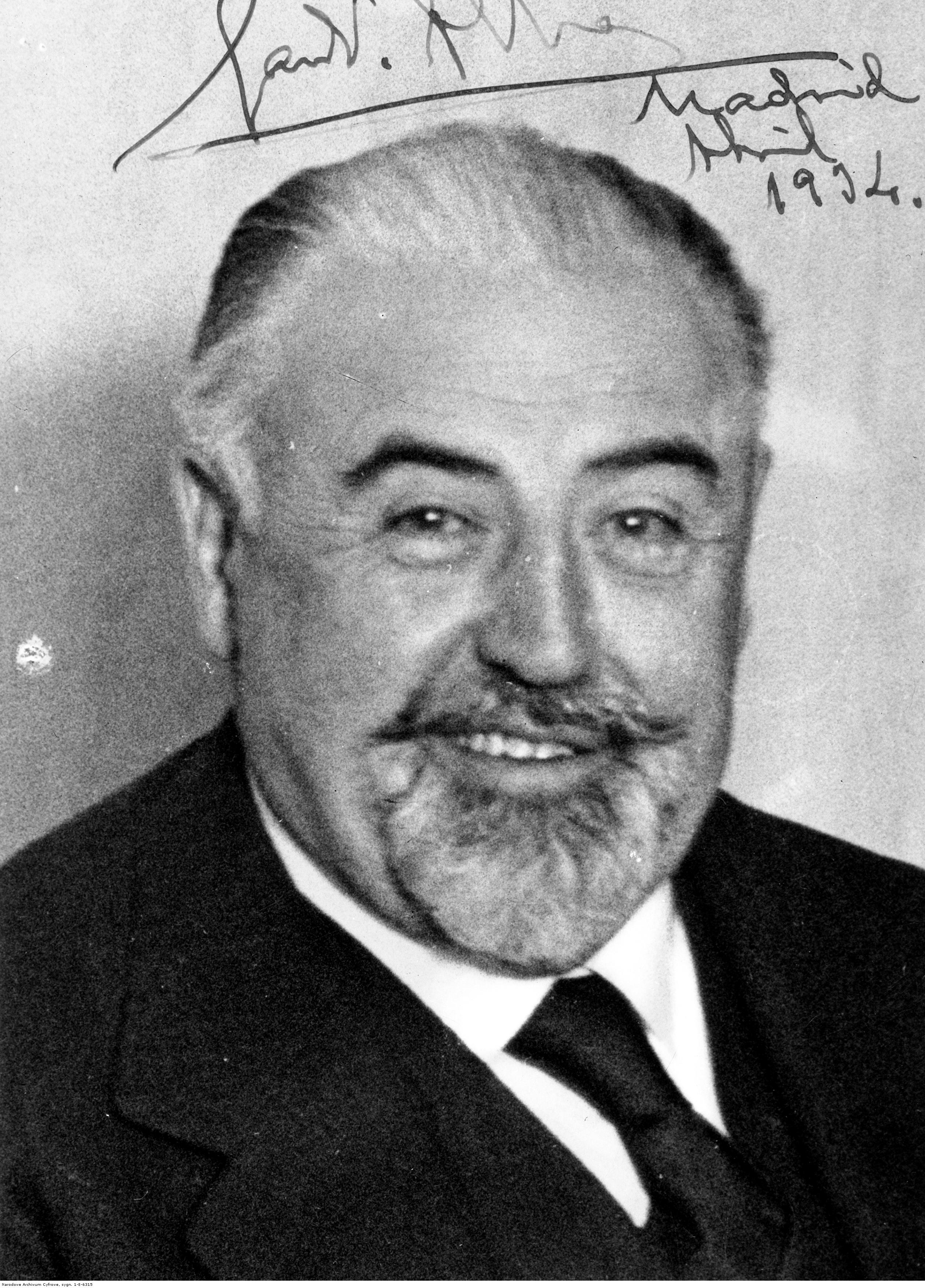
Santiago Alba, 1934

Santiago Alba y Bonifaz (23 December 1872, in Zamora – 8 April 1949) was a Spanish politician and lawyer. He served as Minister of the Navy, Minister of Education and Science, Minister of the Interior, Minister of Housing, and Minister of Foreign Affairs during the reign of Alfonso XIII.

Born to a middle class family with important political connections, he was the son of Obdulia Bonifaz (a relative of Manuel Ruiz Zorrilla) and of César Alba García Oyuelos, a prominent Valladolid lawyer. Alba grew up in Valladolid and studied at the university, receiving a law degree. He also began working for the La Opinión as editor-in-chief, and later bought the newspaper El Norte de Castilla in 1893, where he had also worked as a manager.

Upon the death of her husband, Alba's mother inherited an estate in Cantabria, in the town of Noja. When Alba became the first Marquis of Albaicín, the estate became the Palacio del Albaicín. In 1918, after suffering from an accident in which his car crashed into a tree, he spent some time there recuperating.

He married Enriqueta Delibes in 1897 and began his political career in the elections of 1901, as a representative of the party Unión Nacional, earning a seat in the Cortes as deputy for Valladolid province. He won the seat again in the 1903 elections—after switching to the Partido Liberal—but would give up his seat to become Subsecretary of the Presidency of the Council of Ministers, and in the elections of 1905, he would again give up his seat in order to become Governor of the Bank of Spain. In succeeding elections, which were held until 1936, he would again be elected deputy representing Valladolid, Granada, or Zamora provinces. From 1933 to 1936, he was President of the Cortes.

== Ministry ==
He served as Minister of the Navy from 30 November to 4 December 1906 in the government of Segismundo Moret. He was Minister of Public Education and Belles Artes on two occasions: from 12 March to 31 December 1912 under José Canalejas; and from 22 March to 10 October 1918 under Antonio Maura.

He was Minister of the Interior on two occasions: from 31 December 1912 to 27 October 1913 and from 9 December to 30 October 1916, both times under the Count of Romanones.

He served as Minister of Housing from 30 April 1916 to 11 June 1917 under Romanotes and García Prieto, and adopted the ideas of the movement known as Regeneracionismo. He enacted two programs. The first, proposed “in defense of Spanish values,” prohibited the issuing, introduction, and announcement in the Spanish market of debt securities and bonds associated with foreign governments. The second program reformed laws for tenants in Spain. He later presented to the Cortes some 22 projects concerning administrative and financial reorganizations and reforms, tax law reforms, monopolies, and economic development.

He also successfully enacted a government loan worth billions of pesetas.

During his second term as Minister of Housing (9 November - 5 December 1918), he concerned himself with food supply and transportation issues caused by the First World War. He proposed some agrarian reforms, but these were not carried out.

He then served as Minister of Foreign Affairs from 7 December 1922 to 15 September 1923 in a new cabinet under García Prieto.

During the dictatorship of Miguel Primo de Rivera, Alba exiled himself to France but returned in Spain in 1930. He refused to serve as head of the government after the fall of Dámaso Berenguer. At the outbreak of the Spanish Civil War in 1936, he again exiled himself, this time to Portugal. He returned to Spain in 1945 but no longer involved himself in politics.
