= 1923 Spanish general election =

- 29 April 1923 (Congress); 13 May 1923 (Senate)

All 409 seats in the Congress of Deputies and 180 (of 360) seats in the Senate 205 seats needed for a majority in the Congress of Deputies
- Registered: 4,782,347 (total); 3,128,928 (non-Article 29)
- Turnout: 2,056,974 (65.7%)
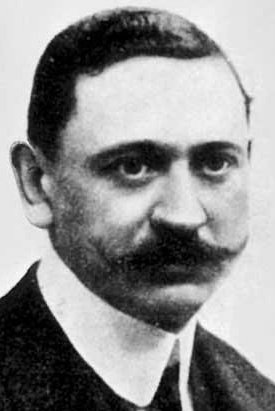

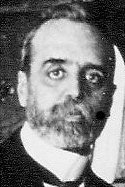

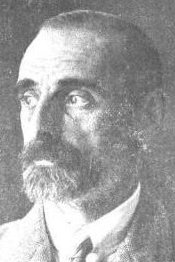

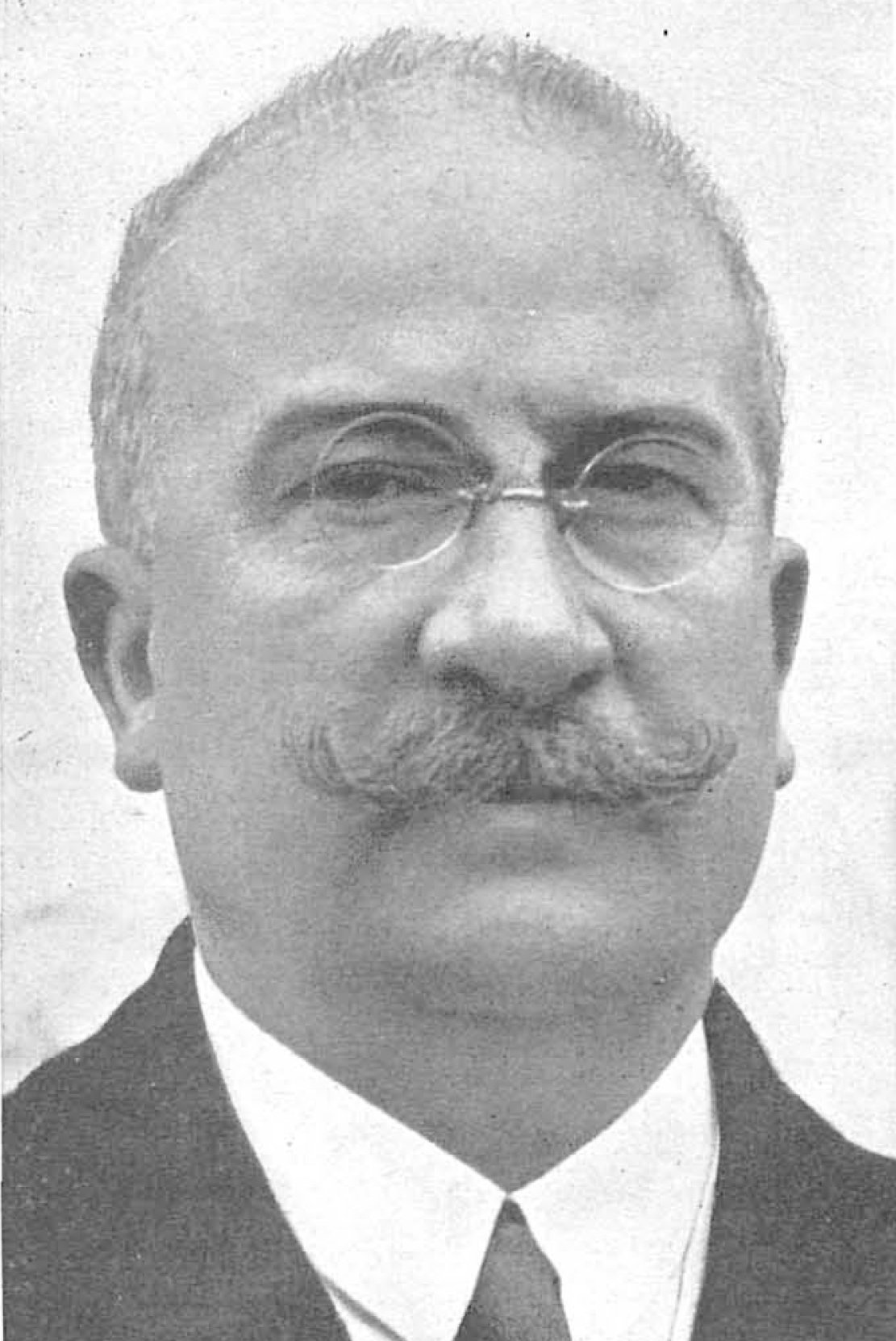

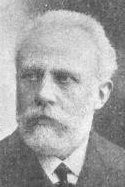

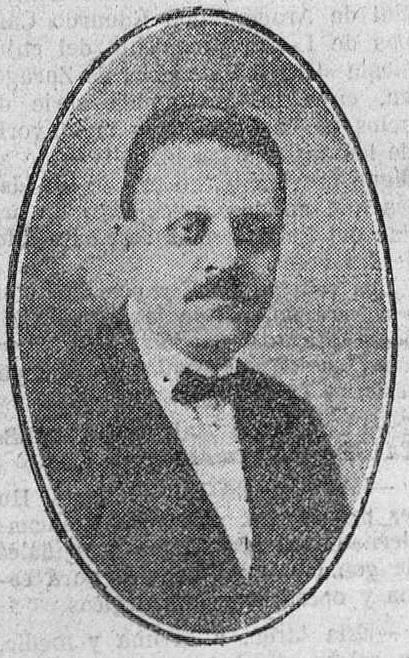
	First party	Second party	Third party
Leader	Marquis of Alhucemas	José Sánchez-Guerra	Francesc Cambó
Party	Liberal Union	Conservative	Regionalist
Leader since	1913	1921	1917
Leader's seat	Senator for life	Cabra	Barcelona
Seats won	223 C / 105 S	124 C / 46 S	22 C / 6 S
Popular vote	979,435	591,026	110,007
Percentage	47.6%	28.7%	5.3%
	Fourth party	Fifth party	Sixth party
Leader	Alejandro Lerroux	Pablo Iglesias	José Selva Mergelina
Party	Republican	PSOE	Carlist
Leader since	1908	2 May 1879	1921
Leader's seat	Barcelona	Madrid	—
Seats won	15 C / 3 S	7 C / 0 S	5 C / 3 S
Popular vote	129,225	38,151	19,071
Percentage	6.3%	1.9%	0.9%
Prime Minister before election
Marquis of Alhucemas
PLD (Liberal Union)
Prime Minister after election
Marquis of Alhucemas
PLD (Liberal Union)

A general election was held in Spain on 29 April 1923 (for the Congress of Deputies), and on 13 May 1923 (for the Senate), to elect the members of the 20th Cortes under the Spanish Constitution of 1876, during the Restoration period. All 409 seats in the Congress of Deputies were up for election, as well as 180 of 360 seats in the Senate. This election was the last under the Restoration system, as it would collapse shortly thereafter and give way to the dictatorship of Miguel Primo de Rivera.

Amid rising social unrest between trade unions—particularly the anarcho-syndicalist National Confederation of Labour (CNT) and the Carlist, yellow Free Trade Unions (Sindicatos Libres)—and the Spanish government, the pistolerismo period saw the assassination of Prime Minister Eduardo Dato in March 1921, as well as the widespread use by Spanish authorities of the ley de fugas method of extrajudicial execution, particularly in Barcelona. During this period of turmoil, a number of Conservative-led governments under Manuel Allendesalazar, Antonio Maura and José Sánchez-Guerra succeeded themselves, each lasting for less than a year.

The election was held against the backdrop of the Picasso file and the parliamentary inquiry committee into the political and legal responsibilities resulting from the disaster of Annual in 1921, in which over 10,000 Spanish soldiers were killed. The debate on responsibilities deepened the divisions within the ruling Conservatives and hastened the downfall of Sánchez-Guerra's government. In a return to the turno system, King Alfonso XIII appointed the Marquis of Alhucemas at the helm of a cabinet formed by the various Liberal factions and the Reformists. A general election was subsequently called, with the Liberal Union securing an overall majority, the first since 1916. Upon its re-opening the parliament resumed its inquiry on the Picasso report.

On 13–15 September 1923, Captain General of Catalonia Miguel Primo de Rivera would take advantage of the political crisis and stage a military coup d'état, blaming the parliamentary system for most of the country's problems. With the decisive acquiescence of Alfonso XIII—increasingly displeased with parliamentarism and wary of the Picasso report pointing to his own responsibility in the Rif War failures—the coup would lead to Primo de Rivera replacing Alhucemas as prime minister, the establishment of a military directorate at the helm of the country, the declaration of martial law and the dissolution of the Cortes, with the 1876 Constitution being effectively abolished. Primo de Rivera would rule Spain as dictator until his fall in 1930 and the subsequent proclamation of the Second Spanish Republic in 1931.

== Background ==
Following the Bourbon Restoration in 1874, the Spanish Constitution of 1876 enshrined Spain as a semi-constitutional monarchy, awarding the monarch—under the royal prerogative—the right of legislative initiative together with the bicameral Cortes; the capacity to veto laws passed by the legislative body; the power to appoint government members (including the prime minister); the ability to grant or deny parliamentary dissolution, the adjournment of legislative sessions and the signature of royal decrees; as well as the title of commander-in-chief of the armed forces. The monarch would play a key role in the turno system by appointing and dismissing governments, which would then organize elections to provide themselves with a parliamentary majority. This informal system allowed the two major "dynastic" political parties at the time, the Conservatives and the Liberals—characterized as oligarchic, elite parties with loose structures dominated by internal factions, each led by powerful individuals—to alternate in power by means of electoral fraud (pucherazo). This was achieved by assigning candidates to districts before the elections were held (encasillado), then arrange their victory through the links between the Ministry of Governance and the territorial clientelistic networks of provincial governors and local bosses (the caciques), excluding minor parties from the power sharing.

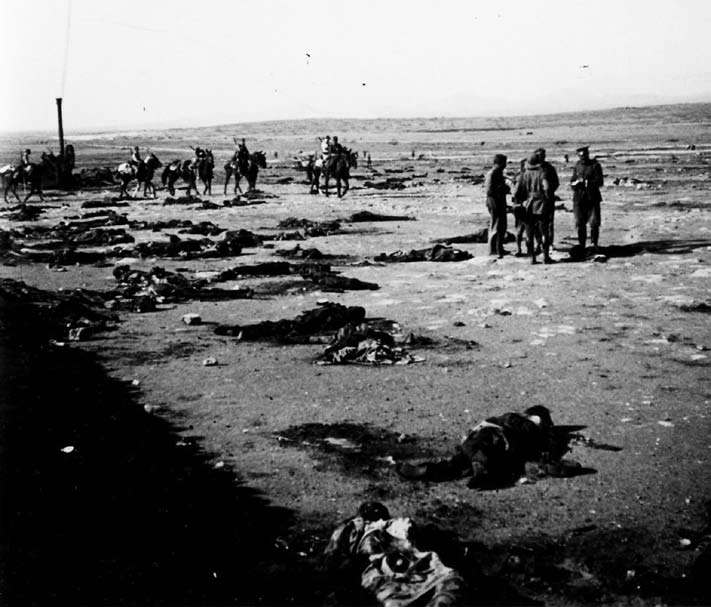
The Picasso file and the political fallout from the Spanish defeat at Annual paved the way for the final collapse of the Restoration system.

The previous election had resulted in the third hung parliament in a row, but with a clear advantage of the Conservatives under Prime Minister Eduardo Dato, who were able to retain power. Following the assassination of Dato in March 1921, the political crisis within his party and the Restoration regime deepened, with an increase in pistolerismo attacks from the Carlist, yellow Free Trade Unions (Spanish: Sindicatos Libres) against members of the anarcho-syndicalist National Confederation of Labour (CNT)—mainly in industrial areas and particularly in Barcelona—and in the crackdown by authorities, seeing an extensive use of the ley de fugas (Spanish for "law of escapes", a type of extrajudicial execution system) by the then-civil governor of Barcelona, Severiano Martínez Anido. A new government was formed under Manuel Allendesalazar, which was immediately forced to manage the political fallout stemming from an anti-political and anti-parliamentarian Córdoba speech by King Alfonso XIII, who criticized the legislative paralysis stemming from political infighting.

The disaster of Annual and the massacre in Mount Arruit in the summer of 1921, a major military defeat in the Rif War in which over 10,000 Spanish soldiers were killed in action, shocked the public opinion and sparked a national crisis that saw the downfall of the Allendesalazar government, its replacement by a national unity government under Antonio Maura (made of conservatives, liberals and the involvement of the Regionalist League) and the start of an investigation into the responsibilities for the defeat (which would come to be known as the "Picasso file"). Maura's cabinet was able to stabilize the country's economy, downplay the Defence Juntas by transforming them into "informative commissions" under the authority of the War ministry—to be later entirely disestablished—and launch a renewed military action in Morocco that saw the reoccupation of the territories lost in 1921. The question of the Annual responsibilities, coupled with the withdrawal of parliamentary support from Conservatives and Liberals, led to the end of Maura's government in March 1922 and its replacement by an exclusively Conservative government led by José Sánchez-Guerra.

The Picasso report was delivered to the Supreme Council of War and Navy in April 1922—detailing numerous military mistakes, political corruption in Allendesalazar's government, indications of policial and criminal responsibilities and hinting at the blame of the King himself for (allegedly) instigating the ill-prepared advance that brought about the disaster—prompting the creation in July of a parliamentary inquiry committee (the "Commission of Responsibilities") that sparked heated parliamentary debates, particularly from the Spanish Socialist Workers' Party (PSOE). Mounting pressure on the government, which still included a number of ministers who had been in office during the battle of Annual, prompted Sánchez-Guerra to submit his resignation to the King, who, under the turno system, reluctantly appointed Liberal leader Manuel García Prieto, Marquis of Alhucemas, as new prime minister. Alhucemas's government, intent on implementing an ambitious plan of reforms aimed at democratizing the oligarchic Restoration system—including an expansion of freedom of religion, limits to the government's power to suspend constitutional rights, democratization of the Senate, agrarian law, reaffirmation of civil power, and a progressive tax reform, among others—called a general election for the spring of 1923 in order to provide itself with a parliamentary majority.

== Overview ==
Under the 1876 Constitution, the Spanish Cortes were conceived as "co-legislative bodies", forming a nearly perfect bicameral system. Both the Congress of Deputies and the Senate exercised legislative, oversight and budgetary functions, sharing almost equal powers, except in budget laws (taxation and public credit)—whose first reading corresponded to Congress—and in impeachment processes against government ministers, where Congress handled indictment and the Senate the trial.

=== Date ===
The term of each chamber of the Cortes—the Congress and one-half of the elective part of the Senate—expired five years from the date of their previous election, unless they were dissolved earlier. The previous elections were held on 19 December 1920 for the Congress and on 2 January 1921 for the Senate, which meant that the chambers' terms would have expired on 19 December 1925 and 2 January 1926, respectively.

The monarch had the prerogative to dissolve both chambers at any given time—either jointly or separately—and call a snap election. There was no constitutional requirement for concurrent elections to the Congress and the Senate, nor for the elective part of the Senate to be renewed in its entirety except in the case that a full dissolution was agreed by the monarch. Still, there was only one case of a separate election (for the Senate in 1877) and no half-Senate elections taking place under the 1876 Constitution.

The Cortes were officially dissolved on 6 April 1923, with the corresponding decree setting election day for 29 April (Congress) and 13 May 1923 (Senate) and scheduling for both chambers to reconvene on 23 May.

=== Electoral system ===
Voting for the Congress of Deputies was based on universal manhood suffrage, comprising all Spanish national males over 25 years of age with full civil rights, provided they had two years of residence in a Spanish municipality and were not enlisted ranks in active duty. It was compulsory, excepting those over 70, the clergy and—within their territories—trial judges and public notaries. Additional restrictions excluded those deprived of political rights or barred from public office by a final sentence, criminally imprisoned or convicted, legally incapacitated, bankrupt, public debtors, and homeless.

The Congress of Deputies had one seat per 50,000 inhabitants. Of these, those corresponding to larger urban areas were elected in multi-member constituencies using partial block voting: voters in constituencies electing ten seats or more could choose up to four candidates less than the number of seats at stake; in those with between eight and ten seats, up to three less; in those with between four and eight seats, up to two less; and in those with between one and four seats, up to one less. The remaining seats were elected in single-member districts by plurality voting and distributed among the provinces of Spain according to population. Candidates in uncontested seats were automatically elected. (Note: Uncontested districts were those where the number of candidates was equal to or fewer than the available seats. Whenever vacancies remained, a by-election was held to fill the remaining seats.)

As a result of the aforementioned allocation, 311 single-member districts were established, and each Congress multi-member constituency (a total of 28, electing 98 seats) was entitled the following seats:

Seats	Constituencies
8	Madrid
7	Barcelona
5	Palma, Seville
4	Cartagena
3	Alicante, Almería, Badajoz, Burgos, Cádiz, Córdoba, Gran Canaria, Granada, Huelva, Jaén, Jerez de la Frontera, La Coruña, Lugo, Málaga, Murcia, Oviedo, Pamplona, Santander, Tarragona, Tenerife, Valencia, Valladolid, Zaragoza

Voting for the elective part of the Senate was based on censitary suffrage, comprising Spanish male householders of voting age, residing in a Spanish municipality, with full political and civil rights, who met either of the following:

- Being qualified electors (such as archbishops, bishops and cathedral chapter members, in the archdioceses; full academics, in the royal academies; university authorities and professors, in the universities; or provincial deputies);
- Being elected as delegates (either by members with three years of seniority (in the economic societies of Friends of the Country; or by major taxpayers for direct taxes and local authorities, in the local councils).

180 Senate seats were elected using indirect, two-round majority voting. Delegates chosen by local councils—each of which was assigned an initial minimum of one delegate, with one additional delegate for every six councillors—voted for senators together with provincial deputies. The provinces of Barcelona, Madrid and Valencia were allocated four seats each, and the rest three each, for a total of 150. The remaining 30 seats were allocated to special institutional districts (one each), including major archdioceses, royal academies, universities, and economic societies, (Note: The following were considered as the major districts in each category: Archdioceses: Burgos, Granada, Santiago de Compostela, Seville, Tarragona, Toledo, Valencia, Valladolid, and Zaragoza.; Royal academies: Spanish; History; Fine Arts of San Fernando; Exact, Physical and Natural Sciences; Moral and Political Sciences; and Medicine.; Universities: Madrid, Barcelona, Granada, Oviedo, Salamanca, Santiago, Seville, Valencia, Valladolid, and Zaragoza.; Economic societies of Friends of the Country: Madrid, Barcelona, León, Seville, and Valencia.) each elected by their own qualified electors or delegates. Another 180 seats consisted of senators in their own right (such as the monarch's offspring and the heir apparent once coming of age (16), grandees of Spain with an income of Pts 60,000, certain general officers—captain generals and admirals—the Patriarch of the Indies and archbishops, and the heads of higher courts and state institutions (Note: These comprised the Council of State, the Supreme Court, the Court of Auditors and the Supreme Council of War and Navy.) after two years of service), as well as senators for life directly appointed by the monarch.

The law provided for by-elections to fill vacant seats during the legislative term.

== Candidates ==
=== Nomination rules ===
For the Congress, secular Spanish males of voting age, with full civil rights, could run for election. Causes of ineligibility applied to those excluded from voting or meeting any of the incompatibility rules for deputies, as well as to:

- Public contractors, within their relevant territories;
- Holders of a number of territorial posts (such as government-appointed positions, not including government ministers and Central Administration employees; local and provincial employees; and provincial deputation members), within their areas of jurisdiction, during their term of office and up to one year afterwards.
- Servants in the judiciary or the prosecution ministry.

Additionally, candidates were required to either have previously served as deputies or be nominated by two current or former senators (or same-province deputies); three current or former provincial deputies (from the same province); or at least one twentieth of the electorate in the constituencies for which they sought election, disallowing electors from nominating more than one candidate (except in multi-member constituencies, which used the same partial block voting system for nominations as for elections).

For the Senate, eligibility was limited to Spanish males over 35 years of age not under criminal prosecution, disfranchisement nor asset seizure, and who either qualified as senators in their own right or belonged (or had belonged) to certain categories:

- Provided an income of Pts 7,500: the presidents of the Senate and the Congress; deputies serving in three different congresses or eight terms; government ministers; bishops; grandees of Spain not eligible as senators in their own right; and various senior officials after two years of service (such as certain general officers—lieutenant generals and vice admirals—and members of higher courts and state institutions); heads of diplomatic missions abroad (ambassadors after two years, and plenipotentiaries after four); heads and full academics in the royal academies; chief engineers; and full professors with four years of service;
- Provided an income of Pts 20,000 or being taxpayers with a minimum quota of Pts 4,000 in direct taxes (paid two years in advance): Spanish nobility; and former deputies, provincial deputies or mayors in provincial capitals or towns over 20,000;
- Having served as senators before the promulgation of the 1876 Constitution.

Other ineligibility provisions for the Senate also applied to a number of territorial officials within their areas of jurisdiction, during their term of office and up to three months afterwards; public contractors; tax collectors; and public debtors.

Incompatibility rules barred combining:

- The role of senator with other legislative roles (deputy, senator and local councillor, except those in Madrid; and provincial deputies within their respective provinces); or with any public post not explicitly permitted under Senate eligibility requirements;
- The role of deputy with any other civil, military or judicial post, with exceptions—and as many as 40 deputies allowed to simultaneously benefit from these—including a number of specific posts based in Madrid, such as any of the aforementioned ones (provided a public salary of Pts 12,500); senior court officials; university authorities and professors; chief engineers; and general officers.

== Results ==
=== Congress of Deputies ===
← Summary of the 29 April 1923 Congress of Deputies election results
Parties and alliances	Popular vote		Seats		
Parties and alliances	Votes	%	A.29	Cont.	Total
Liberal Union (UL)	979,435	47.62	86	137	223
Conservative Party (PC)	591,026	28.73	51	73	124
Republicans (Republicanos)	129,225	6.28	4	11	15
Regionalist League (LR)	110,007	5.35	2	20	22
Spanish Socialist Workers' Party (PSOE)	38,151	1.85	1	6	7
Agrarians (Agrarios)	29,975	1.46	0	1	1
Catholics (Católicos)	26,377	1.28	0	2	2
Carlists (Carlistas)	19,071	0.93	1	4	5
Catalan Action (AC)	16,937	0.82	0	0	0
Basque Nationalist Party (PNV)	13,152	0.64	0	1	1
National Monarchist Union (UMN)	6,240	0.30	0	0	0
Biscay Monarchist League (LMV)	3,437	0.17	0	1	1
Communist Party of Spain (PCE)	2,320	0.11	0	0	0
Independents (Independientes)	54,263	2.64	1	7	8
Other candidates/blank ballots	37,358	1.82	0	0	0
Total	2,056,974		146	263	409
Votes cast / turnout	2,056,974	65.74			
Abstentions	1,071,954	34.26			
Non-Article 29 registered voters	3,128,928	65.43			
Article 29 non-voters	1,653,419	34.57			
Registered voters	4,782,347				

Popular vote
Liberal Union	47.62%
Conservative	28.73%
Republican	6.28%
LR	5.35%
PSOE	1.85%
Agrarian	1.46%
Catholic	1.28%
Carlist	0.93%
NV	0.64%
LMV	0.17%
Independent	2.64%
Others	3.06%

Seats
Liberal Union	54.52%
Conservative	30.32%
LR	5.38%
Republican	3.67%
PSOE	1.71%
Carlist	1.22%
Catholic	0.49%
Agrarian	0.24%
NV	0.24%
LMV	0.24%
Independent	1.96%

=== Senate ===
← Summary of the 13 May 1923 Senate of Spain election results
Parties and alliances	Seats
Liberal Union (UL)	105
Conservative Party (PC)	46
Regionalist League (LR)	6
Republicans (Republicanos)	3
Carlists (Carlistas)	3
Catholics (Católicos)	1
Biscay Monarchist League (LMV)	2
Independents (Independientes)	5
Archbishops (Arzobispos)	9
Total elective seats	180

Seats
Liberal Union	58.33%
Conservative	25.56%
LR	3.33%
Republican	1.67%
Carlist	1.67%
LMV	1.11%
Catholic	0.56%
Independent	2.78%
Archbishops	5.00%

== Bibliography ==
Legislation

- Ley mandando que los distritos para las elecciones de Diputados a Cortes sean los que se expresan en la división adjunta (PDF) (Law). Madrid Gazette (in Spanish). 1 January 1871.
- Constitución de la Monarquía Española (PDF) (Constitution). Madrid Gazette (in Spanish). 30 June 1876.
- Ley electoral de Senadores (PDF) (Law). Madrid Gazette (in Spanish). 8 February 1877.
- Ley electoral de los Diputados a Cortes (PDF) (Law). Madrid Gazette (in Spanish). 28 December 1878.
- Ley enumerando los empleos con los cuales es compatible el cargo de Diputado a Cortes (PDF) (Law). Madrid Gazette (in Spanish). 7 March 1880.
- Ley dividiendo la provincia de Guipúzcoa en distritos para la elección de Diputados a Cortes (PDF) (Law). Madrid Gazette (in Spanish). 23 June 1885.
- Ley dividiendo el distrito electoral de Tarrasa en dos, que se denominarán de Tarrasa y de Sabadell (PDF) (Law). Madrid Gazette (in Spanish). 18 January 1887.
- Ley reformando el art. 4º. de la ley de Incompatibilidades (PDF) (Law). Madrid Gazette (in Spanish). 31 July 1887.
- Ley fijando la división de la provincia de Álava en distritos electorales para Diputados a Cortes (PDF) (Law). Madrid Gazette (in Spanish). 10 July 1888.
- Ley electoral para Diputados a Cortes (PDF) (Law). Madrid Gazette (in Spanish). 26 June 1890.
- Ley disponiendo que las primeras y sucesivas elecciones que se verifiquen en la provincia de Zamora se dividirá en siete distritos en la forma que se expresa (PDF) (Law). Madrid Gazette (in Spanish). 18 June 1895.
- Leyes aprobando la división electoral de las provincias de León y Vizcaya (PDF) (Law). Madrid Gazette (in Spanish). 2 August 1895.
- Leyes aprobando la división electoral en las provincias de Sevilla y de Barcelona (PDF) (Law). Madrid Gazette (in Spanish). 5 July 1898.
- Real decreto disponiendo el número de Senadores que han de elegir las provincias que se citan (PDF) (Royal Decree). Madrid Gazette (in Spanish). 16 March 1899.
- Ley mandando que en lo sucesivo sean cuatro los Diputados a Cortes que elegirá la circunscripción electoral de Cartagena (PDF) (Law). Madrid Gazette (in Spanish). 7 August 1899.
- Ley estableciendo una circunscripción para elegir tres Diputados a Cortes, que la constituirán los cuatro partidos judiciales de Ayamonte, Hueva, Moguer y la Palma, con todas las poblaciones que de ellos forman parte (PDF) (Law). Madrid Gazette (in Spanish). 24 March 1902.
- Ley reformando la Electoral vigente (PDF) (Law). Madrid Gazette (in Spanish). 8 August 1907.
- Ley disponiendo que el territorio de la Nación española que constituye el Archipiélago canario, cuya capitalidad reside en Santa Cruz de Tenerife, conserve su unidad, ateniéndose los servicios públicos en el modo y forma que se determina en esta ley (PDF) (Law). Madrid Gazette (in Spanish). 11 July 1912.
- Real decreto disponiendo que la isla de La Palma (Canarias) se divida, a los efectos de las elecciones para Diputados a Cortes, en dos distritos, que se denominarán de Santa Cruz de la Palma y de Los Llanos (PDF) (Royal Decree). Madrid Gazette (in Spanish). 20 March 1916.
- Real decreto declarando disueltos el Congreso de los Diputados y la parte electiva del Senado; disponiendo que las Cortes se reúnan el día 23 de Mayo próximo, y que las elecciones de Diputados se verifiquen en todas las provincias de la Monarquía el día 29 del mes actual, y las de Senadores el 13 de Mayo siguiente (PDF) (Royal Decree). Madrid Gazette (in Spanish). 6 April 1923.

Other

- Calero, Antonio María (1987). "La prerrogativa regia en la Restauración: teoría y práctica (1875-1902)" (PDF). Revista de Estudios Políticos (in Spanish) (55). Madrid: Centre for Political and Constitutional Studies: 273–315. ISSN 0048-7694.
- Gómez Ochoa, Fidel (1990). "El gobierno de concentración en el pensamiento y la acción política de Antonio Maura (1918-1922)". Revista de Estudios Políticos (in Spanish) (69). Madrid: Centre for Political and Constitutional Studies: 239–251. ISSN 0048-7694.
- Ortega Álvarez, Luis; Santaolaya Machetti, Pablo (1996). "Evolución histórica del sistema electoral español". Revista de las Cortes Generales (in Spanish). 37. Cortes Generales: 65–107. doi:10.33426/rcg/1996/37/784. ISSN 0213-0130.
- Martorell Linares, Miguel Ángel (1997). "La crisis parlamentaria de 1913-1917. La quiebra del sistema de relaciones parlamentarias de la Restauración" (PDF). Revista de Estudios Políticos (in Spanish) (96). Madrid: Centre for Political and Constitutional Studies: 137–161. ISSN 0048-7694.
- Martínez Ruiz, Enrique; Maqueda Abreu, Consuelo; De Diego, Emilio (1999). Atlas histórico de España. El Reinado de Alfonso XIII (1902-1931) (in Spanish). Vol. 2. Bilbao: Ediciones KAL. pp. 121–132. ISBN 9788470903502.
- Armengol i Segú, Josep; Varela Ortega, José (2001). El poder de la influencia: geografía del caciquismo en España (1875-1923) (in Spanish). Madrid: Marcial Pons. pp. 655–776. ISBN 9788425911521.
- García Muñoz, Montserrat (2002). "La documentación electoral y el fichero histórico de diputados". Revista General de Información y Documentación (in Spanish). 12 (1): 93–137. ISSN 1132-1873.
- Carreras de Odriozola, Albert; Tafunell Sambola, Xavier (2005) [1989]. Estadísticas históricas de España, siglos XIX-XX (PDF) (in Spanish). Vol. 1 (II ed.). Bilbao: Fundación BBVA. pp. 1072–1097. ISBN 84-96515-00-1. Archived from the original (PDF) on 24 September 2015.
- Cabo Villaverde, Miguel (2008). "Leyendo entre líneas las elecciones de la Restauración: la aplicación de la ley electoral de 1907 en Galicia". Historia Social (in Spanish) (61): 23–43. JSTOR 40658114.
- Martínez Relanzón, Alejandro (2017). "Political Modernization in Spain Between 1876 and 1923". Annales Universitatis Mariae Curie-Skłodowska, Sectio K. 24 (1). Madrid: Maria Curie-Skłodowska University: 145–154. doi:10.17951/k.2017.24.1.145. S2CID 159328027.
- Villa García, Roberto (2020). "¿Un sufragio en declive?: las elecciones al Congreso de 1923". Historia y Política (in Spanish). 43: 255–290. doi:10.18042/hp.43.09. hdl:10115/27459. ISSN 1989-063X.
- Royal Academy of History (2022). "Historia Hispánica". Historia Hispánica (in Spanish).
- Ruiz Franco, Rosario (2024a). "Historia Contemporánea de España. Reinado de Alfonso XIII (1902-1923). El Desastre de Annual y el Expediente Picasso" (PDF) (in Spanish). Charles III University of Madrid.
- Ruiz Franco, Rosario (2024b). "Historia Contemporánea de España. Dictadura de Primo de Rivera (1923-1930). El "cirujano de hierro": el golpe de Estado de septiembre de 1923" (PDF) (in Spanish). Charles III University of Madrid.
