= Dámaso Berenguer =

Spanish general and politician (1873–1953)

Dámaso Berenguer y Fusté 1st Count of Xauen
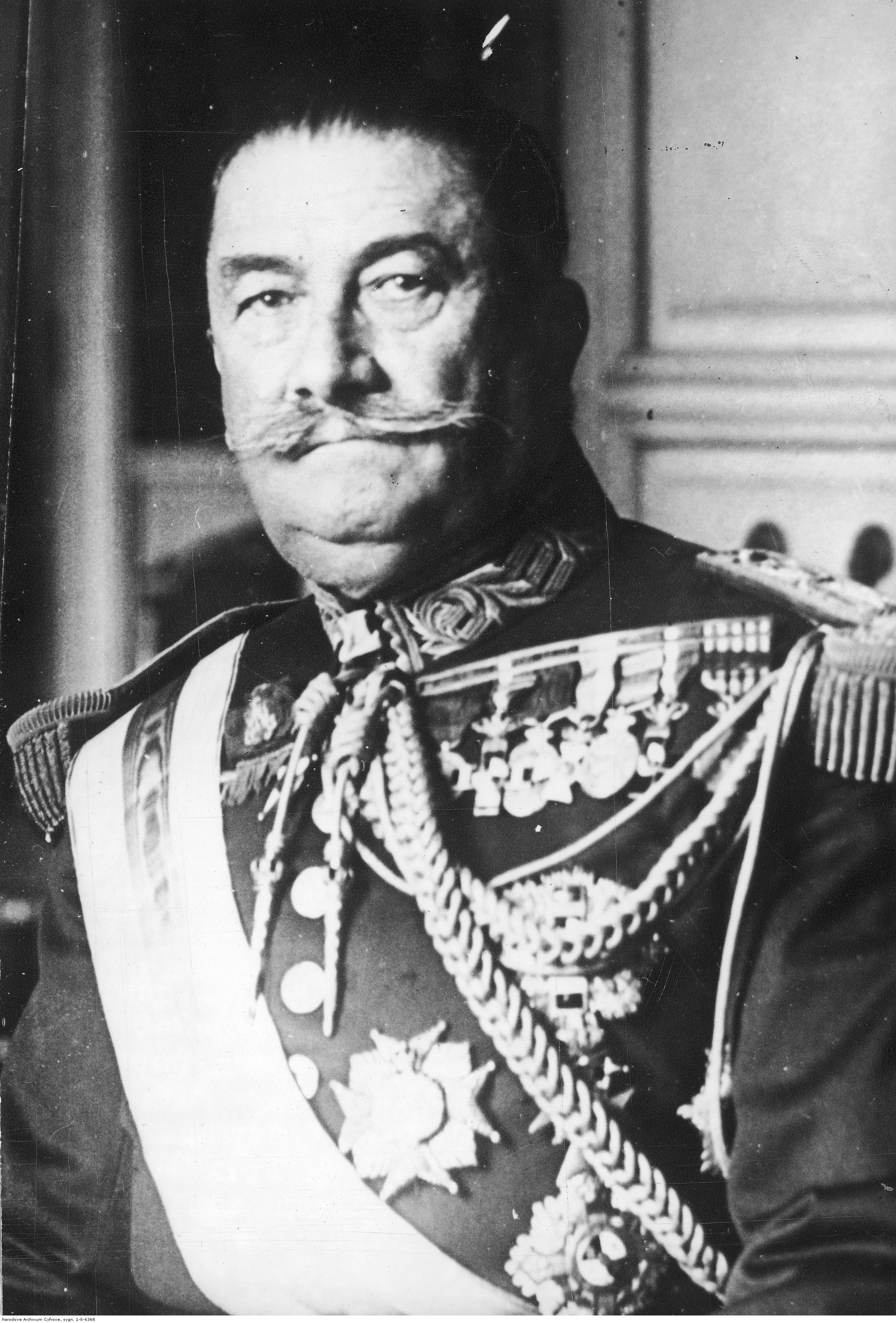

Prime Minister of Spain
- In office 30 January 1930 – 18 February 1931
- Monarch: Alfonso XIII
- Preceded by: Miguel Primo de Rivera
- Succeeded by: Juan Bautista Aznar-Cabañas

Minister of the Army of Spain
- In office 30 January 1930 – 14 April 1931
- Monarch: Alfonso XIII
- Prime Minister: Himself; Juan Bautista Aznar
- Preceded by: Julio Ardanaz
- Succeeded by: Manuel Azaña

Minister of War of Spain
- In office 9 November 1918 – 27 January 1919
- Monarch: Alfonso XIII
- Prime Minister: Manuel García Prieto; Álvaro de Figueroa
- Preceded by: José Marina Vega
- Succeeded by: Diego Muñoz Cobo

High Commissioner of Spain in Morocco
- In office 27 January 1919 – 13 July 1922
- Monarch: Alfonso XIII
- Prime Minister: Manuel García Prieto; Count of Romanones; Antonio Maura; Joaquín Sánchez de Toca; Manuel Allendesalazar; Eduardo Dato
- Minister of State: Count of Romanones; Manuel González-Hontoria y Fernández-Ladreda; Duke of Ripalda; Joaquín Fernández Prida
- Preceded by: Francisco Gómez Jordana
- Succeeded by: Ricardo Burguete

Head of the Military Room of the House of His Majesty the King of Spain
- In office 2 September 1926 – 28 March 1930
- Monarch: Alfonso XIII
- Preceded by: José Zabalza e Iturriria
- Succeeded by: Felipe Navarro y Ceballos-Escalera

Personal details
- Born: Dámaso Berenguer y Fusté; 4 August 1873 San Juan de los Remedios, Cuba
- Died: 19 May 1953 (aged 79) Madrid, Francoist Spain

Dámaso Berenguer y Fusté, 1st Count of Xauen, (4 August 1873 – 19 May 1953) was a Spanish general and politician. He was the penultimate prime minister to serve under Alfonso XIII.

== Biography ==
Berenguer was born in San Juan de los Remedios, Cuba, while the island was a Spanish administrative division.

He enlisted in the army in 1889, served in Cuba and Morocco.

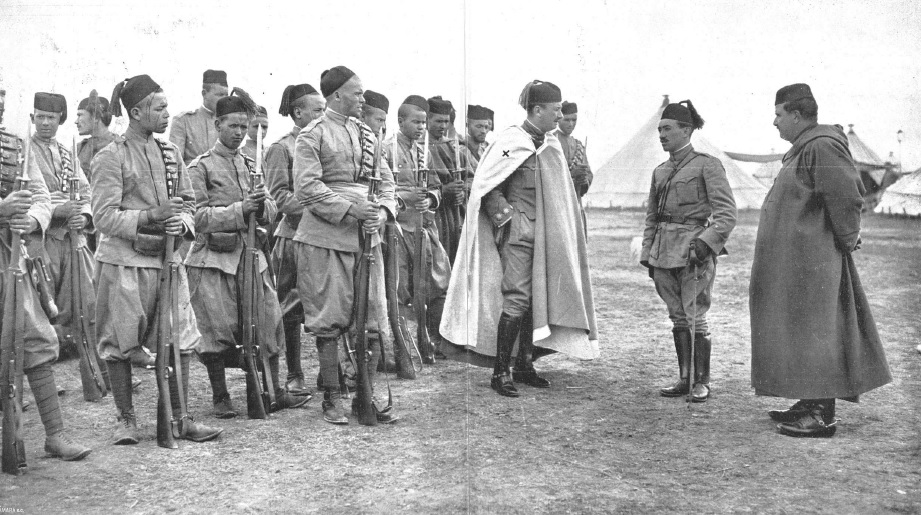
Berenguer and a company of regulares visiting Carabanchel in 1913 for the latter's pledge of allegiance, by Campúa.

He served in the Second Melillan campaign, taking part in the action of the Barranco del Lobo (1909).

He founded the Fuerzas Regulares Indígenas on 30 June 1911 and fought in the ensuing Kert campaign, leading the action that killed Riffian leader Mohamed Ameziane in 1912, bringing the end of the campaign. He was promoted to brigadier general in 1916, and, in 1918, to division general.

In 1918, he was appointed Minister of War under Prime Minister Manuel García Prieto.

He was appointed January 1919 as High Commissioner of Spain in Morocco. He proceeded to occupy Chaouen on 14 October 1920, and Berenguer, one of the leading protegees of Alfonso XIII in Africa along Manuel Fernández Silvestre, was granted the noble title of Count of Xauen in reward.

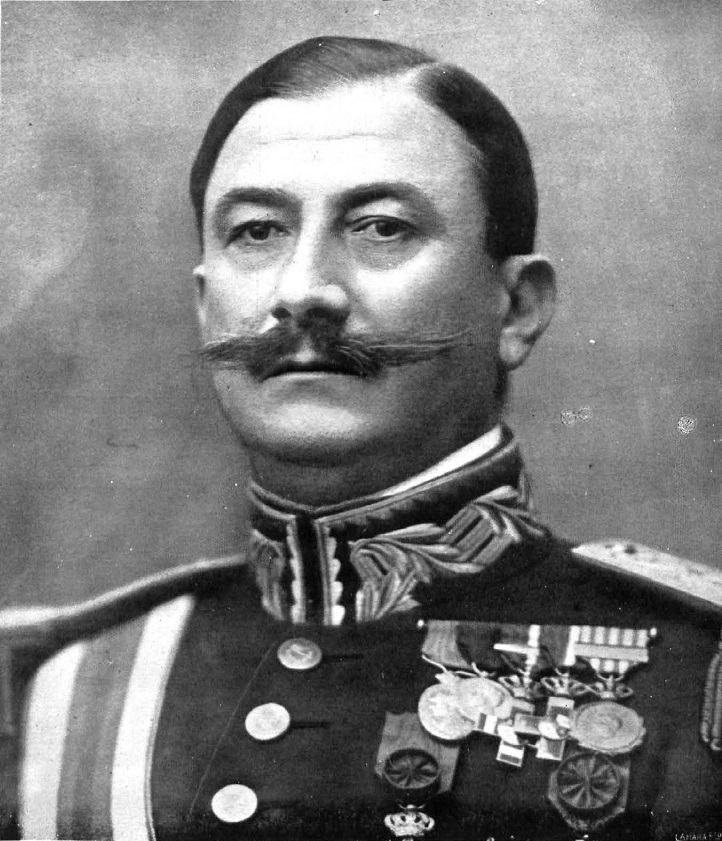
Photographic portrait by Franzen published in 1919

The disaster for the Spanish Army in Morocco in the summer of 1921, which included the defeat at the Battle of Annual and the ensuing slaughter of about 2,000 Spanish soldiers in Monte Arruit, murdered by the Riffians after their surrender, delivered a coup de grâce to the regime of the Restoration. The armed forces was deeply divided between africanistas vs. junteros and responsibilists vs. impunists. Berenguer sanctioned the use of chemical weapons against civilians during the Rif War, stating in a telegram to the War Minister in August 1921 that "I have been obstinately refractory to the use of suffocating gases against these indigenous peoples but after what they have done, and of their treacherous and deceptive conduct, I have to use them with true joy."

After three previous rejected attempts to hand in his resignation as High Commissioner, he finally did so by mid 1922. An official investigation carried out by General Juan Picasso González had already been opened to determine responsibility for the disastrous military strategy vis-à-vis the 1921 collapse, and Berenguer, in his capacity as High Commissioner, found himself among those martialled.

Amid the structural collapse of the Restoration regime, by the summer of 1923, plotting took place in the military. In September 1923 a pronunciamiento by Miguel Primo de Rivera took place in Barcelona, bringing the dictatorship of Primo de Rivera, as the King appointed the former as Prime Minister after the success of the coup d'état. Primo de Rivera, previously associated with pro-abandonment (abandonista) stances vis-à-vis Morocco had been counterintuitively supported in his coup by the Cuadrilátero, a quad of Africanist generals in Madrid vying for stronger interventionism in Morocco that included Federico, the brother of Dámaso. Yet, ultimately, despite their differences, they shared the same contempt for what they thought to be persecution of the military by the government due to Annual.

Despite attempts to bring the process to a halt by Primo de Rivera (he even attempted to confiscate the report), the trial on the performance of Berenguer and Navarro began on 16 June 1924. Attempting to pander to the military, Primo de Rivera amnestied Berenguer.

In 1926, Berenguer became Chief of Staff of the Military House of the King, a post conventionally destined to burned-out generals liked by King Alfonso XIII in order to move them away from the spotlight for a time.

In January 1930, following the forced resignation of Primo de Rivera, Alfonso XIII tasked Berenguer with the formation of a government seeking to restore the country to its pre-1923 state, as if nothing had happened in between. During his mandate as prime minister, Berenguer repealed some of the harsher measures introduced by Primo de Rivera, earning his regime the nickname dictablanda (the toothless dictatorship, blanda meaning soft, as opposed to the preceding dictadura, dura being the Spanish word for hard).

He also faced a number of problems, such as increasing demands for the abolition of the monarchy, disorganisation among the country's political parties after seven years of repression making the calling of prompt elections an impossible task, labour unrest, and at least one military uprising. One of the last straws nailing the coffin of the monarchist regime was an article titled "el error Berenguer" (the Berenguer mistake), authored by Jose Ortega y Gasset in El Sol, which famously ended with "Delenda est monarchia".

Berenguer resigned as prime minister on 14 February 1931; he was replaced by Admiral Juan Bautista Aznar-Cabañas, under whom he served as Minister of War. Two months later, King Alfonso XIII fled the country and the Republic was declared. Berenguer was tried on his performance in Morocco and irregularities in the repression of the 1930 Jaca uprising. He was cleared in 1935 and retired from public life. He played no relevant role in the July 1936 uprising that led to the Spanish Civil War.

Berenguer died inside his home, at 15 Atocha Street, in Madrid on 19 May 1953 from thrombosis.
