= Manuel Ruigómez =

Spanish general (1887–1967)

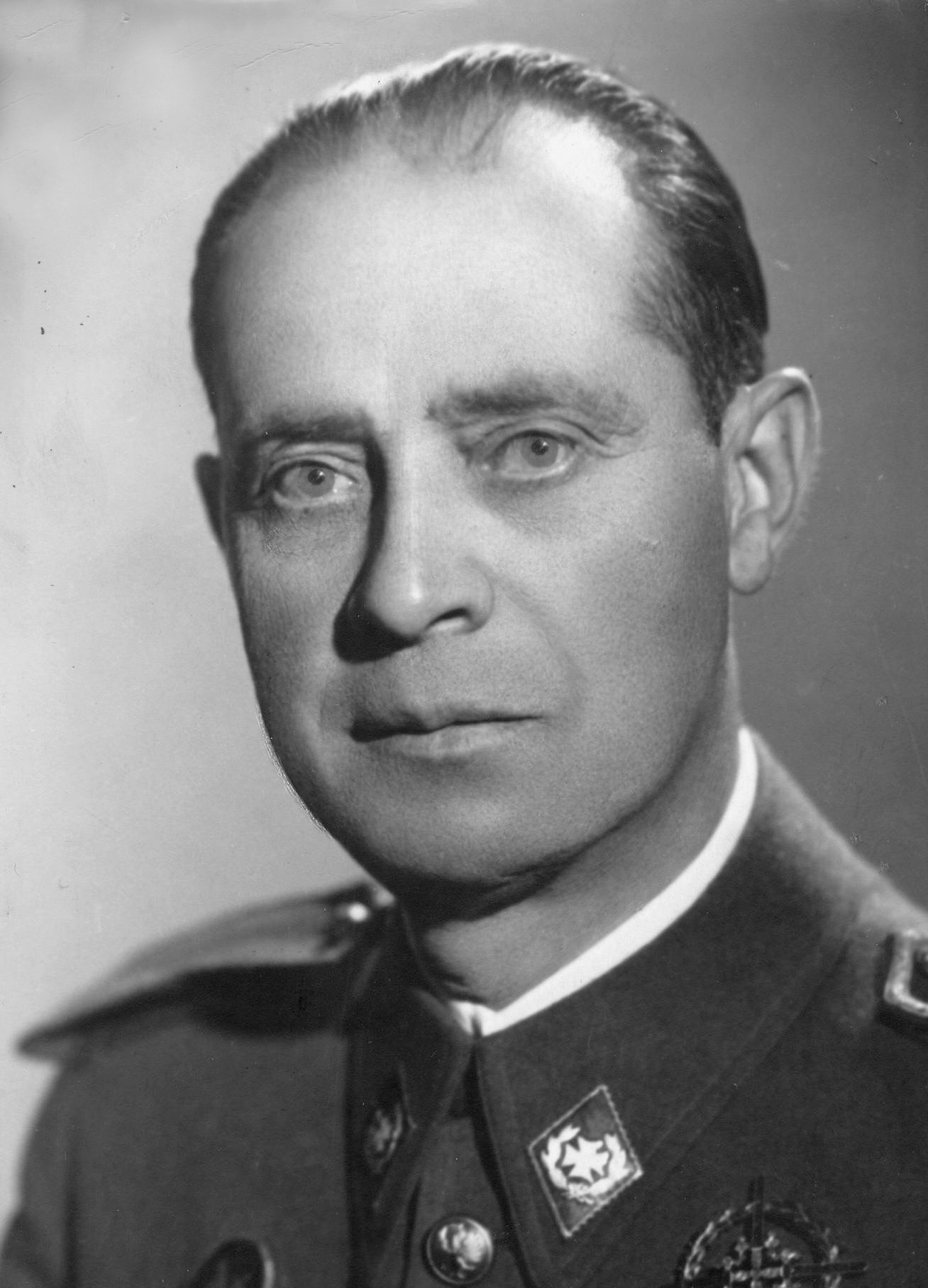
- Ruigómez in 1944
- Born: Manuel Ruigómez y Velasco
- Military career
- Allegiance: Kingdom of Spain
- Branch: Army
- Service years: 1905–1955
- Rank: General
- Nickname: The angel of Morocco
- Unit: Infantry Regiment of Melilla
- Conflicts: Rif War
- Awards: Laureate Cross of Saint Ferdinand; Medalla Militar

Manuel Ruigómez y Velasco (July 15, 1887 – March 26, 1967) was a Spanish Army officer known for his role as a medical officer in the Rif War, during the period of Colonial Africa. In 1919, he was awarded the Laureate Cross of Saint Ferdinand, Spain's highest decoration for gallantry.

Ruigómez was born in the village of Villasana de Mena in Burgos to a prominent family of distinguished army officers. In 1905, Ruigómez enrolled in the Artillery Academy of Segovia as part of the 199th promotion. With the rank of lieutenant, he was assigned to the Melilla Regiment of Infantry.

== Career ==
On June 12, 1911, he began his military career in Africa. As part of the Infantry Command of Melilla.

On July 11, 1919, he took part in the occupation of Kudia Rauda (Ceuta) attached to the Third Group of Indigenous Regular Forces, assisting them in the first line of combat as well as helping those wounded in the operation.

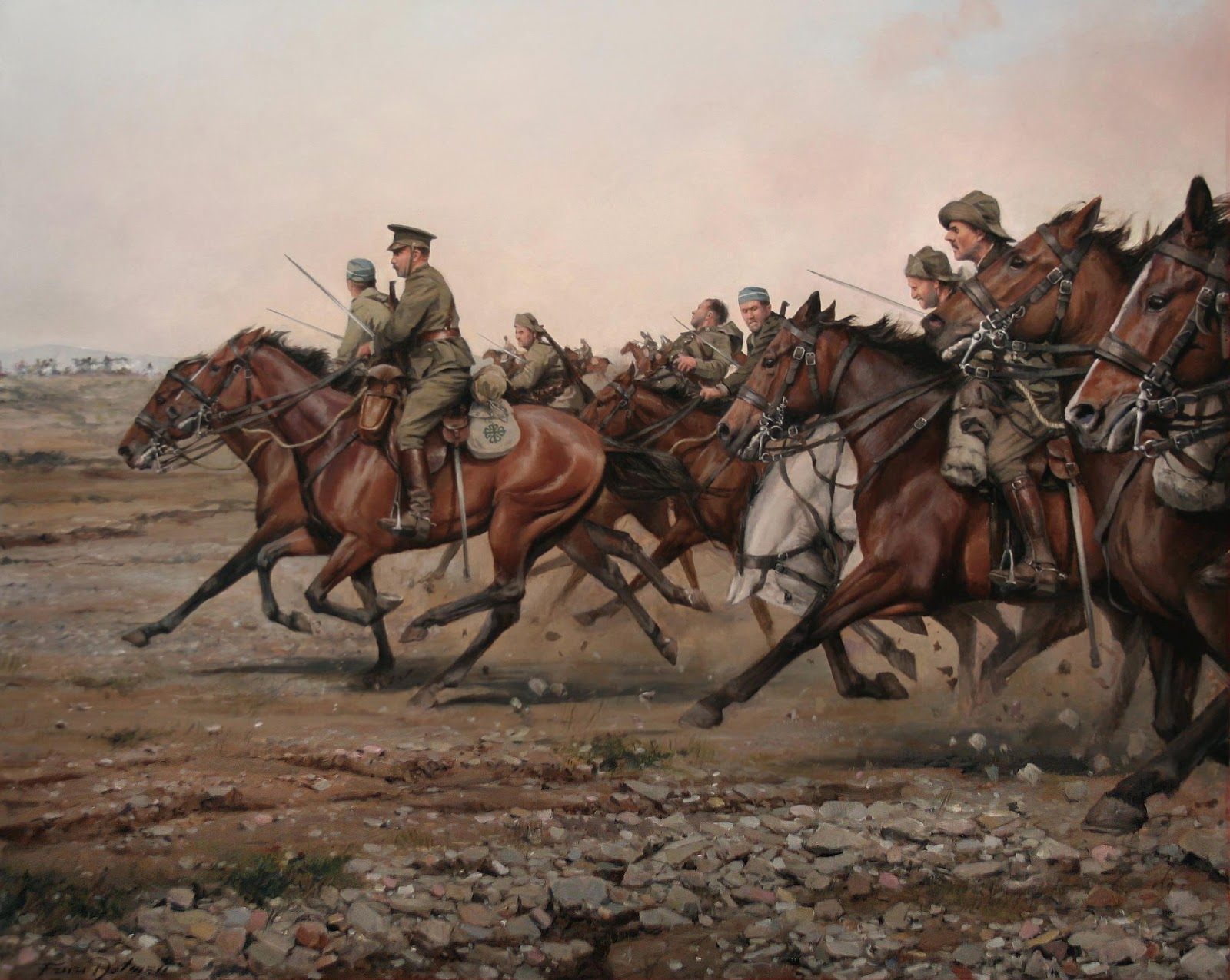
Charge of the Igan river, painting of Augusto Ferrer-Dalmau.

In 1920 as a military doctor, he was assigned to the Cavalry Regiment "Cazadores de Alcántara" nº 14, as third-in-command, when the Disaster of Annual took place. On July 22, 1921, Lieutenant colonel Fernando Primo de Rivera y Orbaneja, his companion in cavalry, had five squadrons of the regiment deployed, four of sabers and one of machine guns (461 men, 22 officers and 439 troops) behind Izumar. The chief-in-command of the Regiment, Colonel Manella, had been in Annual in charge of the district for three days, making Primo de Rivera first-in-command and Ruigómez, second.

On July 23, 1921, Primo de Rivera, in compliance with the orders received and in front of his 2nd squadron, two sections of the 4th and one of the 1st of the Regiment of Alcantara, with a total of 192 riders, protected the withdrawal of Chaif towards Dar Drius. During the retreat, the Alcántara Regiment repeatedly charged the Riffians, suffering heavy losses.

Coat of arms of Manuel Ruigómez, encircled by the Laureate Cross.

That same day, they were given orders to protect the withdrawal from Dar Drius to Batel. During the retreat, they continued to charge the Riffians, which brought the regiment to the verge of annihilation. The charges made during the crossing of the Igan River were extremely difficult, with the soldiers having to carry it out on foot, costing them much of their cavalry.

Months later, the remains of the cavalry were located on the bed of the Igan River in the same place where they had fallen. Of 461 men who formed his regiment, the number of survivors was around 80, including Ruigómez.

Ruigómez was promoted to general shortly before his retirement in 1955.

== Awards ==
On July 11, 1919, Ruigómez was rewarded by King Alfonso XIII with the Laureate Cross of Saint Ferdinand of first class as well as the Medalla Militar, for the courage demonstrated in the siege of Kudia Rauda, saving many soldiers.

When he returned to Villasana de Mena, after the award and attaining "heroic valour", a crowded neighbourhood received him at the Railway Station. The General expressed his desire and willingness to put the decoration to the Virgin of Cantona, the Parish Priest of Villasana and Archpriest of the Valley, who accepted it.

== See also ==
- Rif War
