= Picasso file =

Report about 1921 battle

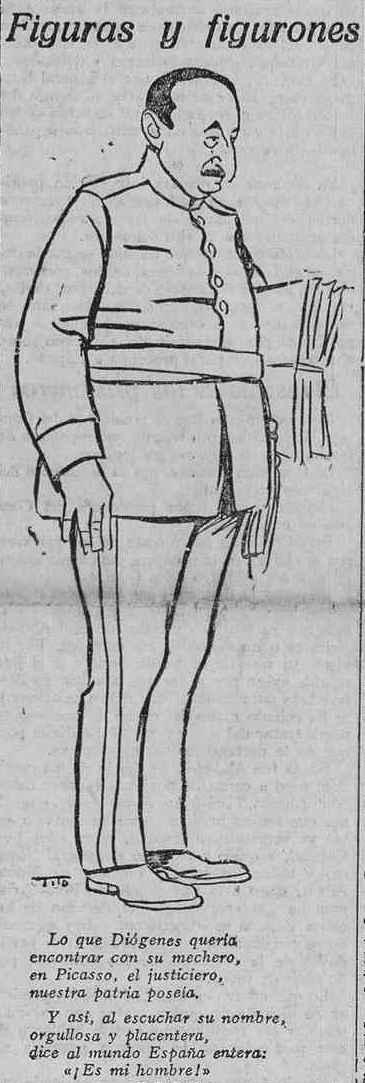
Caricature of General Juan Picasso carrying the File, published in December 1922 in the newspaper La Libertad. The caption of the cartoon reads: "What Diogenes wanted to find with his lighter, in Picasso, the vigilante, our country possessed. And so, upon hearing his name, proud and pleasant, says to the whole world Spain: "He's my man!"

The Picasso File (in Spanish: Expediente Picasso) is the name given to the report written by General Juan Picasso González, assigned to the Supreme Council of War and Navy, the highest body of military jurisdiction, in relation to the events that took place in the General Command of Melilla in the months of July and August 1921, known as the "Annual Disaster".

The following year, General Picasso presented his conclusions to the Supreme Council of War and Navy in a four hundred page summary. The government presided by the conservative José Sánchez Guerra then decided to take the Picasso File to the Congress of Deputies, where a first Commission of Responsibilities was formed in July 1922. It presented its verdict (actually there were three) to the Cortes in November, starting an intense debate. In fact, during that time the File became the most important political problem in the country. In July 1923 a second Commission of Responsibilities was formed but it could not issue any verdict because it was prevented from doing so by Primo de Rivera's coup d'état in September 1923. Primo de Rivera closed the Cortes and the file was dismissed.

The Second Spanish Republic, proclaimed in April 1931, formed a new Commission of Responsibilities which focused on the actions of ex-king Alfonso XIII, who was condemned in absentia for "high treason" in November 1931. The new Cortes which emerged from the elections of November 1933, with a majority of the center and the right, transferred the case to the Supreme Court, but on July 9, 1935, the latter ruled that the case should be dismissed because no more punishable acts were found than those already judged (the only sentence passed for the "Disaster of Annual" had been the military arrest of General Dámaso Berenguer for six months). Regarding the possible political responsibilities, the Supreme Court concluded that the only ones that could be derived would be subject "to the judgment of history, and only demandable by public opinion or through its representative bodies". There ended the judicial (and political) course of the Picasso File.

== Background ==
Between the end of July and the beginning of August 1921, the greatest defeat of the Spanish colonial army in the Moroccan Protectorate took place. In what would be known as the "Disaster of Annual", more than 8,000 men died —most of them replacement soldiers— including General Fernandez Silvestre who commanded the troops and who for several years had been a member of the Military Household of King Alfonso XIII. The territory of effective Spanish control in the Protectorate was reduced to Ceuta and Melilla, and to Tétouan and Larache, with which all the advances achieved in the previous campaign, that of 1912-1913, were lost. The victors of Annual, the Republic of the Rif led by Abd el-Krim, seized 20,000 rifles and 200 cannons and took several hundred Spanish prisoners.

The commotion caused in Spain by the tragedy was enormous. The government presided over by the conservative Manuel Allendesalazar tried to hide the events by imposing censorship on the press, but these became known and on August 11 he resigned. Alfonso XIII entrusted the old conservative leader Antonio Maura to form a government, who managed to count on the support of the two parties of the time, of the Catalanists of Francesc Cambó, of the reformists of Melquiades Álvarez and even of the Republicans of Alejandro Lerroux. The Socialists did not pronounce themselves. Maura supported the decision taken by Allendesalazar before resigning to appoint General Juan Picasso to prepare a report on the events in Morocco.

An example of the impact caused by the "Annual disaster" was the resounding intervention of the socialist deputy Indalecio Prieto in the Cortes on October 27, 1921. After giving a grotesque account of the war in Morocco (he said, for example, that Melilla was "a brothel and a hideout for thieves"), he made direct accusations against King Alfonso XIII, which provoked continuous protests from the majority of the deputies and the intervention of the president of the Chamber in defense of the person "who, because of his prerogative, is here beyond criticism". But Prieto continued: the High Commissioner Dámaso Berenguer had been appointed because of "his great influence on the mood of a certain personality"; General Silvestre had acted the way he did because he had been authorized by the monarch.... And he ended with a sentence that provoked a great tumult: "Those fields of dominion [of Morocco] are today fields of death: eight thousand corpses seem to gather around the steps of the throne in demand of justice". In a later speech outside Parliament, Prieto said: "a catastrophe like that of Annual in the peoples that have vitality is liquidated with a revolution that overthrows the cause of it". For all this Prieto was prosecuted.

== History ==
=== Investigation of the file ===
After the military collapse, the High Commissioner of Spain in Morocco, General Dámaso Berenguer, requested the Minister of War that a general officer, appointed by him, investigate the events and determine the responsibilities. By Royal Order of August 4, 1921, Luis de Marichalar y Monreal, Viscount of Eza, Minister of War, appointed General Juan Picasso to investigate the events in Melilla itself, with the help of the brigade auditor Juan Martínez de la Vega y Zegrí. However, the disaster proved to be of such magnitude that the Allendesalazar government was forced to resign. In August 1921, King Alfonso XIII commissioned Antonio Maura to form a government, and he appointed Juan de la Cierva as Minister of War.

Picasso had already begun his investigations in Melilla, and on August 15 he sent General Berenguer a letter requesting the operational plans that had guided the actions of General Silvestre and his troops. General Berenguer sent the letter to the Minister of War on August 20, requesting instructions in this regard and also stating that he did not consider himself authorized to provide such information as it was a reserved matter. Under pressure from the Minister, a new Royal Order was issued on 24 August, clarifying to General Picasso that the agreements, plans or dispositions of the High Commissioner were outside his investigations, and that he should limit himself to the acts carried out by the chiefs, officers and troops in order to deduce responsibilities in those cases in which military obligations had not been fulfilled.

On August 31, the general expressed his disagreement with the Royal Order in a letter to the minister, arguing that it should be investigated without exempting anyone, including the highest levels of command, since responsibilities could not be reduced to "incidental events, a natural and obligatory consequence of the errors and mistakes of the command". He also offered the possibility of being relieved of his commission to continue his work as Spanish military representative to the League of Nations. The response was positive. An order of September 1 authorized him to examine all military personnel, as it specified that the investigation "would be limited to the events carried out [...], without any exception".

In Melilla, General Picasso took statements from seventy-nine people, only in relation to Annual. One by one, he wrote "Dead", "Disappeared", "Present" or "Empty" next to the names of the soldiers and officers who were involved in the Disaster. On January 23, 1922, after six months of work, the general returned to Madrid with a bulging file of 2,433 pages. On April 18, 1922, the general delivered the file (and a final summary written by himself) to the Ministry of War.

While General Picasso was investigating the file, the idea was growing among certain sectors of the country that the case against those responsible for the "disaster of Annual" would lead nowhere. This is attested to by these coplillas by Luis de Tapia published in the newspaper La Libertad on September 6, 1921 with the title Ni caso, and in which an allusion is made to the possible responsibility of the king:

If in telegrams or cables

you hear that Picasso

is going to find those responsible...

pay no attention...

The mistakes were true;

but in matters of war,

the causes and the dead

are thrown to the ground...

The iron will not be small

if it is to search on high!

If Picasso on the top stings,

he'll be a failure.

The Socialists also showed their mistrust about the report that General Picasso could prepare and about its political and judicial virtuality. This was expressed by the Socialist deputy Indalecio Prieto: "Whoever wants to learn about what happened in the Melilla area, through this information [...], will not learn anything [...]. Twenty generations of mice will make their nests in this mountain of paper. This is where all the purging of responsibilities through official investigations will stop". In May 1922 Prieto insisted again: "After the months that have elapsed, there is not even a shadow before the country of the existence of a responsibility, not even a clear intention to walk with a firm and sure step in search of responsibility. Picasso does not exist; Picasso already, on the lips of the Spaniards, is a fiction, an entelechy, in vulgar language, Mr. Minister of War, a hoax". The writer Miguel de Unamuno, a furious anti-Alfonsino, was also skeptical ("the first person of the State is the one to blame for everything shameful and illegal that happens in our country", he had said publicly about Alfonso XIII). In a speech at the Ateneo de Madrid in March 1922 he said in reference to the Picasso File that "it will be dissolved under any pretext; I, however, I would be glad if it were discussed [because] I am eager to see what becomes of what I call the "santiagada"".

=== Picasso File at the Supreme Council of War and Navy ===
By Royal Order communicated on April 21, 1922, the Supreme Council of War and Navy received the file, passing it on April 24 to the military prosecutor, José García Moreno, who on June 26 returned it to the Supreme Council, pronouncing to "pass on the proceedings to the gathered, in the Justice Chamber, for having found indications of criminal responsibilities, requesting to ratify all the testimonies and to correct the deficiencies found; to open a file to detail merits and rewards; and to communicate the proceedings to the Ministry of War". Two days later, on June 28, the public prosecutor, Ángel Romanos, sent a letter to the Council identifying himself with the report of the military prosecutor.

What General Picasso presented was a summary of some four hundred pages, in which he imputed the Command in the first place, since "with unconsciousness, with incapacity, with dazedness or recklessness it has caused the collapse of the artificial construction of the territory". "The file revealed dramatic facts and actions, some heroic, others cowardly, and underlined the disorganization, incompetence and strategic errors of the command".

At the July 6 meeting, the Supreme Council of War and Navy, presided over by General Francisco Aguilera, decided to prosecute 39 military personnel for negligence or dereliction of duty in Annual, in addition to the 37 officers charged in the Picasso file itself. Among those indicted was General Dámaso Berenguer, High Commissioner of Morocco at the time of the events, whom the Picasso File did not accuse but whose strategy was criticized. Thus, on July 10, the plenary session of the Council agreed to prosecute Berenguer, asking the Senate for the corresponding request given his condition of senator, and for this reason General Berenguer left the position of High Commissioner. In the same order it was agreed not to prosecute any civilian because they did not fall under the jurisdiction of the Council, so the President of the Government Manuel Allendesalazar and the Minister of War Juan de la Cierva were left out of the investigation.

=== Parliamentary commissions of responsibilities ===
Due to the insistence of some deputies, in particular the socialist Indalecio Prieto, the president of the government, the conservative José Sánchez Guerra —who on March 7, 1922 had succeeded Antonio Maura, who had presented his resignation to the king due to internal dissensions within his government—, decided to pass the Picasso File to the Cortes. This fact caused a radical change in the opinion of Prieto and the Socialists. Thus, the previously skeptical Indalecio Prieto was full of praise for the Government of Sánchez Guerra for the "proof of exquisite and extraordinary respect given to the function of the sovereignty of the Parliament" and to General Picasso himself, "the most worthy general of the Spanish Army who has instructed this file".

On July 21, only a few days after the Picasso File had been taken to the Congress of Deputies, a Commission of Responsibilities was formed, one of whose members was Prieto. It was called the "Nineteen" because of the number of deputies on it. The Minister of War sent to the President of the Congress of Deputies a list of testimonies deduced from the file and a series of documents and telegrams considered to be of interest. As public opinion became aware of the contents of the file, indignation and demands for accountability grew. In fact, "during the second half of 1922, the Picasso File became the center of political life in Spain".

The Commission of Responsibilities made public its opinion on November 14, 1922. In reality there were three opinions: that of the conservative majority, which defended that the responsibilities were exclusively military and that they were already being judged by the Supreme Council of War and Navy; that of the liberals, which also pointed to the military command but included the conservative cabinet of Allendesalazar; and that of the socialist Indalecio Prieto, who held responsible for the "disaster of Annual" all the governments of the parties of that time since 1909 and demanded the prosecution of High Commissioner Berenguer and that of General Felipe Navarro, who was still a prisoner of Abd el-Krim. It also demanded that the governments of Allendesalazar and Maura be tried by the Senate for prevarication.

The sessions of the Congress of Deputies in which the opinions were debated were stormy, especially when Indalecio Prieto, who had traveled to Morocco and talked to the victims, and the Count of Romanones, who had lost a son in the fighting, intervened. In fact, the liberals, seconding Romanones, left the chamber when Prieto's opinion was voted on, so that it was rejected only with the votes of the conservatives. In the heated parliamentary debates of November 21 and 22, Indalecio Prieto held King Alfonso XIII directly responsible for what had happened, as head of the Army and the State. In view of the turn that the parliamentary sessions were taking, the president of the government, Sánchez Guerra, decided to present his resignation to the king. "Mr. President [of the Congress of Deputies]: in view of the attitude of the minorities, I say to Your Majesty that the session cannot continue because there is no Government, so I am leaving from here to the Palace to present my resignation", said Sánchez Guerra. The king appointed as his replacement as head of the presidency of the government the liberal Manuel García Prieto and the debate on the political responsibilities for the "disaster of Annual" continued. From then on, as Professor Francisco Alía Miranda has pointed out, "the Parliament became a real nightmare for the monarch, with the issue of responsibilities being openly debated in commissions and speeches".

On April 29, 1923 general elections were held and, as was foreseeable according to the customs of the Restoration, the Cortes that emerged from them had a liberal majority, the same political sign as the government that had called them. As soon as they were constituted on May 24, the Supreme Council of War and Navy presented before the Senate a petition for a supplication from General Berenguer, a senator appointed by the King. For its part, in the Congress of Deputies, a second Commission of Responsibilities was formed on July 3, at the request of Republicans and Socialists, composed of twenty-one deputies and presided over by Bernardo Mateo Sagasta (of which the Socialist Indalecio Prieto was once again a member). On August 7 General Berenguer was summoned to testify before the Commission. On the 11th the minutes of the Junta de Defensa Nacional were denied to the Commission, and rumors began to spread that the king himself was implicated in the disaster. In view of the turn of events and the lack of agreement of the members of the Commission, they agreed to convene the Plenary of the Chamber for October 2 and to hold a general vote on the matter.

However, the Plenary never met: on September 13 the captain general of Catalonia, Miguel Primo de Rivera, staged a coup d'état, dissolved the Chambers and proclaimed the dictatorship with the king's approval. In a statement to the British newspaper Daily Mail on January 20, 1924, the king justified his "acceptance" of Primo de Rivera's dictatorship because, among other reasons, "it was necessary to use an energetic therapy on the malignant tumors that we suffered in the Peninsula and in Africa".

=== Closing of the Picasso File during the Dictatorship of Primo de Rivera ===
In the manifesto made public by General Miguel Primo de Rivera to justify the coup d'état in Spain in 1923, he alluded to the "tendentious passions surrounding the problem of responsibilities". The manifesto went on to say: "The country does not want to hear any more talk of responsibilities, but to know them, to demand them promptly and justly, and this we will entrust, with a time limit, to Courts of moral authority and dispassionate about what has poisoned politics up to now". The truth was that the day after the coup, all the documentation of the Commission of Responsibilities of the Congress of Deputies was seized and the plenary session scheduled for October 3, in which the report of the Commission was to be debated, was suspended sine die. It would never be held, "for Alfonso XIII's peace of mind".

As having definitively dismissed the Picasso File would have meant giving reason to those who claimed that one of the motives of the coup had been to hide it, Primo de Rivera allowed the Supreme Council of War and Navy —which dealt with military responsibilities and not with political ones— to continue its work, but soon some of its members were replaced by others more inclined to absolve the accused soldiers and without prior consultation with its president, General Aguilera resigned in March 1924 for this reason. Three months later, the verdict against General Navarro (2nd Chief of the General Command of Melilla) and General Dámaso Berenguer (High Commissioner of Morocco at the time of the Annual disaster) was made public. The former was acquitted and the latter was sentenced to a light penalty: dismissal from the service and transfer to the reserves. And two weeks later, on July 4, the king decreed a broad amnesty for all those involved in the defeat of Annual, including General Berenguer —although he was later sentenced to six months of military arrest—. Later King Alfonso XIII would end up appointing General Berenguer head of his Military Household. As Professor Alía Miranda has pointed out, "in this way, the matter of responsibilities was closed without any consequences. [...] The bill that the king had to pay for trying to put an end to his personal nightmare would turn out to be very costly in the end, since the decision to join his fate to that of the dictator and the dictatorship would drag him into exile seven and a half years later".

In an article written by Indalecio Prieto shortly after Primo de Rivera's coup, he pointed to the monarch Alfonso XIII himself as the instigator of the coup in order to prevent the Commission of Responsibilities from being able to formulate any kind of accusation. The article ended as follows:

What interest could the Crown have in facilitating the triumph of the military movement? The Cortes were going to be opened, the problem of responsibilities for the Melilla catastrophe which had already brought the previous Parliament to a halt, and in the debate, perhaps with mutual accusations, the parties of the regime would be torn apart and high personal responsibilities would once again appear... Perhaps this devastating spectacle would cause the mutiny to arise in the streets. The military sedition, protected and tutored from above, could frustrate it. And the strange uprising arose, an uprising of Royal order.

=== Picasso File during the Second Republic ===
Convinced that Primo de Rivera wanted to destroy it, Bernardo Mateo Sagasta, president of the Second Commission of Responsibilities, took it from the archives of the Congress and hid the files in the Special School of Agricultural Engineers, of which he was director. It remained there until the advent of the Second Spanish Republic in April 1931, when Sagasta returned the file to the Congress of Deputies. The Constituent Courts, elected in June, proposed to resume the work of the Commission of Responsibilities, which had been interrupted in September 1923.

The Republican Commission did not carry out any specific action on the "Annual disaster", but focused on the responsibilities of Alfonso XIII, not only in his actions in the "Morocco problem" but above all in his unconstitutional acceptance of the Dictatorship of Primo de Rivera. Thus the ex-king was tried and condemned in absentia in the Cortes on November 19 and 20, 1931, for having committed a crime of high treason against the sovereignty of the people. On the other hand, the four hundred page summary prepared by General Picasso in 1923 was published that same year, as were the reports of the Commission of Responsibilities.

The new Cortes that emerged from the elections of November 1933, with a majority of the center and the right, did not continue with the Commission of Responsibilities but decided on May 10, 1934 that "the summaries and proceedings of all kinds" in the possession of the Commission should pass to the Supreme Court to continue "the substantiation of each case". Thus, the High Court opened the investigation "to purge the responsibilities that the Command may have incurred due to the events that occurred in the General Command of Melilla in the months of July and August 1921", but on July 9, 1935 it ruled that the case be closed because no other punishable acts were found other than those already judged (the only sentence passed for the "Annual Disaster" had been the military arrest of General Dámaso Berenguer for six months). Regarding the possible political responsibilities, the Supreme Court concluded that the only ones that could be derived would be subject "to the judgment of history, and only [sic] demandable by public opinion or through its representative bodies".

During the dictatorship of General Franco nothing was known about the famous file.

== Conclusions of the Picasso File ==
According to María Ángeles Recio García, General Picasso exposed in his report the following reasons for the "catastrophe":

- The disproportionate extension of the operations front, with an enormous amount of garrisons, totally disproportionate to the forces available in the Command, which he described as "absurd".
- It also seemed to Picasso a relevant error to have left armed cabiles in the rear, as they were being subdued.
- Likewise, the reckless advance through unsubmissive territory without having learned lessons from the failure of Abarán. Six days after the fall of Abarrán, Silvestre occupied Igueriben.
- Also, having entrusted the security of the rearguard territory to the accumulation of poorly organized, poorly supplied and insufficiently garrisoned positions.
- There was also a lack of support lines, in case a withdrawal was necessary.
- Once the events took place, the accumulation at the front of all the forces available in the region left both the rearguard and the Plaza [Melilla] unprotected.

The concurrence of the previous reasons ―wrote Picasso― "provoked the "disastrous withdrawal, which was unforeseen by the commanding officer".

== Access to the Picasso File and other contents related to the disaster of Annual ==
Known in fragmentary form for a long time, the Picasso report was recovered in its entirety and transferred to the National Historical Archive in 1990. The Picasso File itself consists of 10 pieces and 2418 folios. All this content has been digitized and can be consulted in the Portal de Archivos Españoles, where it appears as "Información Gubernativa instruida para esclarecer los antecedentes y circunstancias que concurrieron en el abandono de posiciones del territorio de la Comandancia General de Melilla en el mes de julio de 1921 (Expediente Picasso)" with reference number "FC-TRIBUNAL_SUPREMO_RESERVADO, Exp.50". The first piece contains a valuable index of the same and the web pages of each piece detail in general outline the respective contents.

Together with the Picasso File itself, the National Historical Archive contains a closely related piece, which includes testimonies obtained later, for example those of the Spanish prisoners involved in the Annual Disaster and released years later. Its name is "Causa en única instancia instruida por el Consejo Supremo de Guerra y Marina para depurar las responsabilidades en que podría haber incurrido el Mando con motivo de los sucesos desarrollados en el territorio de la Comandancia General de Melilla en los meses de julio y agosto de 1921" and its signature is "FC-TRIBUNAL_SUPREMO_RESERVADO, Exp.51". This case has 39 separate pieces, all of them publicly accessible. In the article referenced in the previous lines you can find an extensive description of both files, as well as their genesis and history.

== See also ==
- 1923 Spanish coup d'état
- "Annual disaster"

== Bibliography ==
- Alía Miranda, Francisco (2018). Historia del Ejército español y de su intervención política (in Spanish). Madrid: Los Libros de la Catarata. ISBN 978-84-9097-459-9.
- Balado Insunza, Francisco Manuel (2021). "El expediente Picasso y las Comisiones de Responsabilidades" (PDF). Ejército. Revista del Ejército de Tierra Español (in Spanish) (963): 88–93.
- Cabrera, Mercedes (2021). "La sombra marroquí: Consecuencias políticas de las campañas norteafricanas". A cien años de Annual. La guerra de Marruecos (in Spanish). Epilogue by Lorenzo Silva (Daniel Macías Fernández ed.). Madrid: Desperta Ferro Ediciones. pp. 383–418. ISBN 978-84-122212-8-2.
- Carrasco García, Antonio (1999). Las imágenes del Desastre (in Spanish). Madrid: Almena. ISBN 84-922644-9-7.
- La Porte Fernández-Alfaro, Pablo (2003). El desastre de Annual y la crisis de la Restauración en España (1921-1923) (in Spanish). Madrid: UCM. ISBN 84-669-1072-7.
- Palma Moreno, Juan Tomás (2001). Annual 1921. 80 años del Desastre (in Spanish). Madrid: Almena. ISBN 84-930713-9-0.
- Pando Despierto, Juan (1999). Historia secreta de Annual (in Spanish). Madrid: Ediciones Temas de Hoy, S.A. p. 423. ISBN 84-7880-971-6.
- Picasso, Juan (1931). Expediente Picasso [Picasso file] (in Spanish). The full title of the book is: De Annual a la República, El Expediente Picasso. Las responsabilidades de la actuación española en Marruecos. July, 1921. It is actually two volumes of 612 and 436 pages each. (Javier Morata ed.). Madrid: Morata.
- Recio García, María Ángeles (2018). "El desastre de Annual en el Parlamento español: las Comisiones de Responsabilidades" (PDF). Guerra Colonial. Revista Digital (in Spanish) (2): 61–78. Archived from the original (PDF) on December 31, 2021.
- Tusell, Javier; García Queipo de Llano, Genoveva (2002) [2001]. Alfonso XIII. El rey polémico (in Spanish) (2nd ed.). Madrid: Taurus. ISBN 84-306-0449-9.
- VV.AA. (2004). El expediente Picasso: las sombras de Annual (in Spanish). Madrid: Almena. ISBN 84-96170-01-2.
