= Fernando Primo de Rivera y Orbaneja =

Spanish soldier

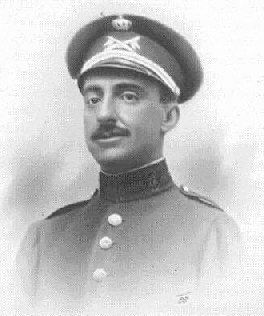
- Born: 30 July 1879; Jeréz de la Frontera, Spain
- Died: 5 August 1921 (aged 42); Monte Arruit, Morocco
- Burial place: Saint Isidore Cemetery
- Spouse: María Cobo de Guzmán
- Relatives: Miguel Primo de Rivera y Orbaneja; José Antonio Primo de Rivera
- Military career
- Allegiance: Spain
- Branch: Cavalry
- Service years: 1898-1921
- Rank: Lieutenant Colonel
- Conflicts: Rif War
- Awards: Crosses of Military Merit; Cross of Maria Cristina; Laureate Cross of Saint Ferdinand

Fernando Primo de Rivera y Orbaneja (30 July 1879 – 5 August 1921) was a Spanish soldier, brother of the dictator Miguel Primo de Rivera y Orbaneja and uncle of Falange’s founder José Antonio Primo de Rivera.

== Early life and career ==
Fernando Primo de Rivera y Orbaneja was born in Jeréz de la Frontera on 30 July 1879. He entered the Cavalry School in Valladolid in 1898, excelling at both riding and fencing. He completed his training in the Saumur Cavalry School in France. In 1909 he married María Cobo de Guzmán.

== Moroccan War ==
After various postings on the Spanish Mainland and being promoted to Captain, he was ordered to Melilla, commanding the 2nd Taxdirt hunters squadron. He received a commendation for the Cross of Military Merit for his actions in battle. In the same year, after taking the village of Ulad Garen, he was promoted to Commander and awarded the Cross of María Cristina. Like his brother Miguel, Fernando criticised the Spanish intervention in Morocco.

=== Disaster of Annual ===
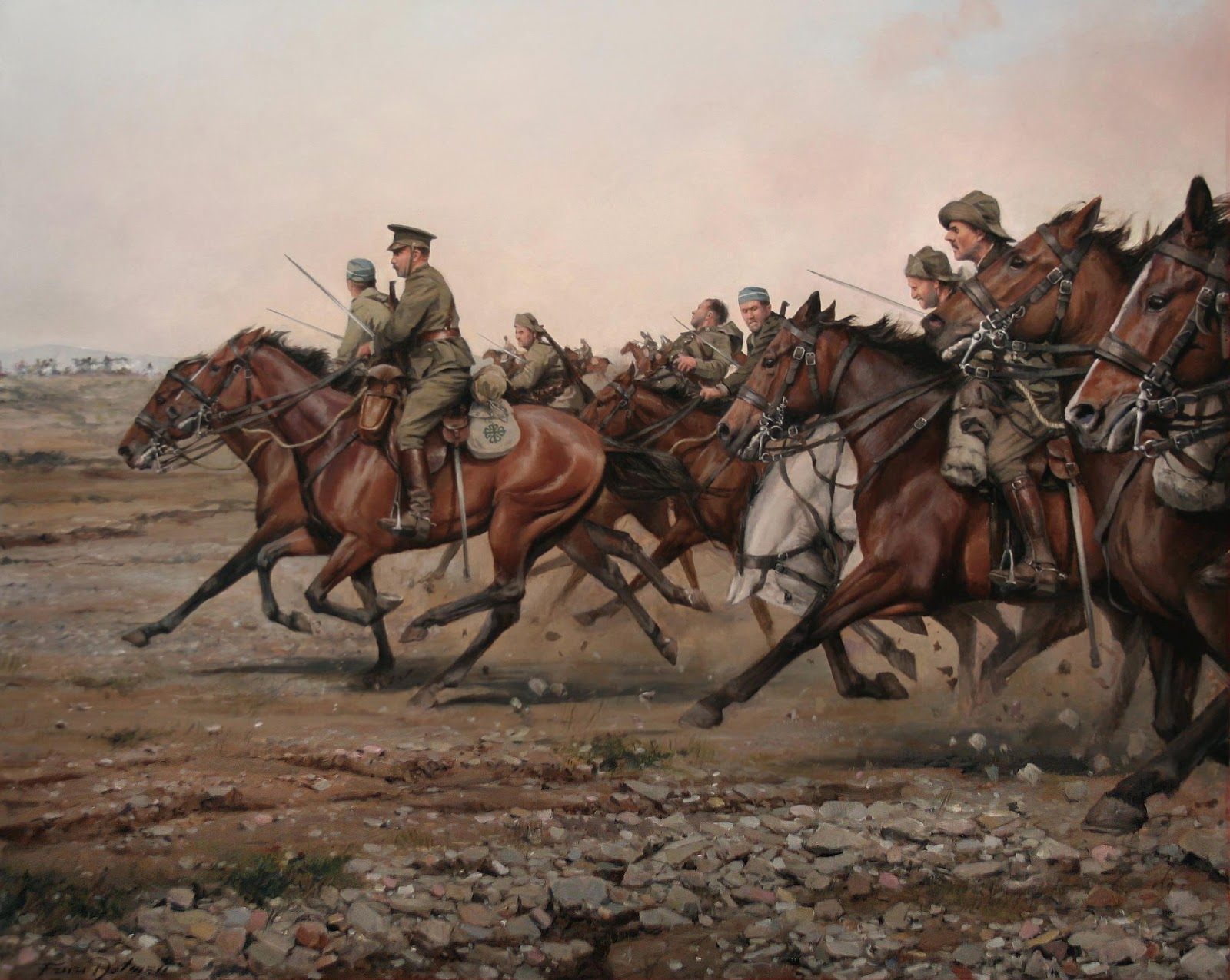
Charge of the River Igan, painting by Augusto Ferrer-Dalmau

In 1920, by then lieutenant colonel, he was sent to the Cavalry Hunter Regiment of Alcántara nº 14 as second commander. It was then that the so-called Disaster of Annual occurred. On 22 July 1921, Primo de Rivera had deployed the regiment’s four sabre squadrons and its machine gun squadron (461 men: 22 officers and 439 troops) behind Izumar. The Regiment’s commander, colonel Francisco Manella Corrales, had moved to Annual three days earlier to relieve colonel Argüelles. The following day, Primo de Rivera, following orders received and leading his 2nd squadron, two sections of the 4th and one of the 1st regiment of Alcántara, with a total of 192 riders, provided cover to the Spanish forces’ retreat from Chaif towards Dar Drius and subsequently towards Batel. During the retreat, his regiment repeatedly charges against the Riffian fighters, sustaining heavy losses. The charges during the crossing of the river Ighane resulted in the loss of most of the horses, the soldiers having to continue charging on foot. In the end, the Cavalry Hunter Regiment of Alcántara lost 28 of its 32 officers and 523 of its 685 troops in the battle.

== Death ==
Primo de Rivera was killed during the siege of Monte-Arruit on 6 August having been wounded by an enemy grenade shell while observing the cannon fire from the parapet. His arm had to be amputated without anaesthesia due to the scarcity of resources available at their position and he succumbed shortly after to gangrene. For his actions in battle, Primo de Rivera was commended for the Laureate Cross of Saint Ferdinand, awarded posthumously in 1923.
