= Manuel Fernández Silvestre =

Spanish general (1871–1921)

The Most Excellent Manuel Fernández Silvestre OAX
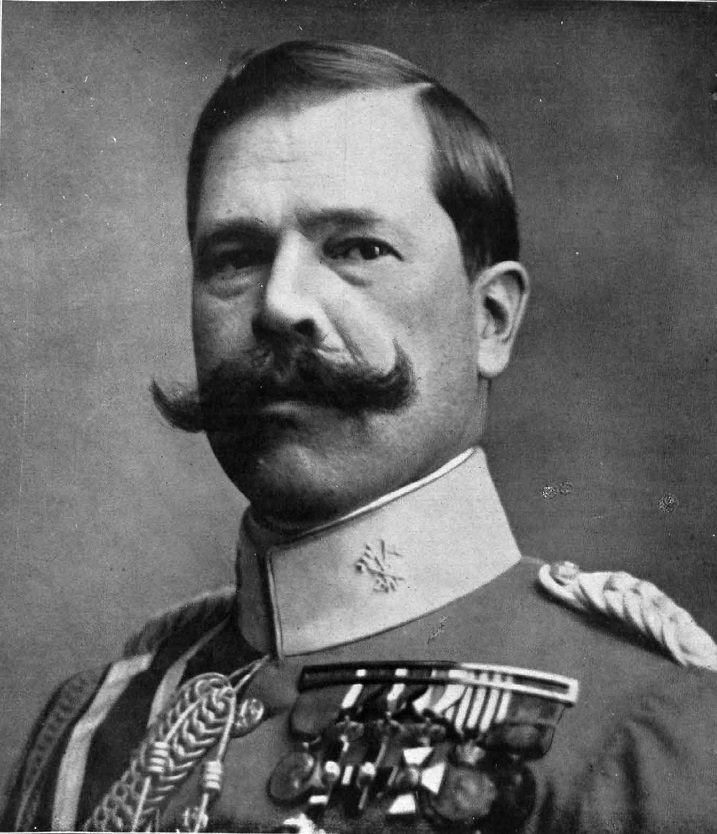
- Photograph by Kaulak

Personal details
- Born: Manuel Fernández y Silvestre; December 16, 1871 El Caney, Captaincy General of Cuba
- Died: July 22, 1921 (aged 49) Annual, Spanish Morocco

Military service
- Allegiance: Kingdom of Spain
- Years of service: 1889–1921
- Rank: General de división (divisional general)
- Battles/wars: Spanish–American War; Rif War †

Manuel Fernández Silvestre (December 16, 1871 – July 22, 1921) was a Spanish general.

Manuel Fernández Silvestre was the son of a lieutenant colonel of artillery, Victor Fernández and Eleuteria Silvestre. In 1889, he enrolled in the Toledo Infantry Academy, where he met with the future high commissioner of Spanish Morocco, Dámaso Berenguer. He served as commander of the Spanish enclaves in Morocco: Ceuta from 1919 to 1920 and of Melilla from 1920 to 1921. Afterward he commanded all Spanish armies in Africa during the opening phase of the Rif War in which his forces suffered a massive and disastrous defeat at Annual. With the battle lost, Silvestre was either killed or committed suicide on July 22, 1921. This is considered one of the worst defeats ever suffered by the contemporary Spanish Army.

== Biography ==
=== Youth ===
Silvestre was born in El Caney in the Spanish Cuba to the second marriage of his father, artillery lieutenant colonel Victor Fernandez y Pentiaga and his mother Eleuteria Silvestre Quesada. Silvestre joined the Toledo General Military Academy where he met future general and prime minister Damaso Berenguer y Fuste who was two years younger than Silvestre. Silvestre graduated on March 9, 1893, as a cavalry second lieutenant, aged 21.

== Career ==
=== Cuba ===
Silvestre first saw military action in 1890 at the age of 19 in a skirmish as a cadet against the Mambises guerrillas which were seeking independence for Cuba. In February 1895, a full-blown rebellion broke out, known as the Cuban War of Independence. After he graduated from the academy, Silvestre returned to Cuba in 1895 to fight against the Mambises, until the Spanish lost the 1898 Spanish–American War in which he suffered 16 wounds, including a severe wound that led to an incapacity of the left arm, which, in the future, he disguised very well. During his time in Cuba, the aggressive Silvestre had a marked preference for cavalry charges and fighting hand to hand against the Mambises. He was widely liked and respected by the men under his command. A charismatic, charming man whose nickname was Manolo, Silvestre was a great womanizer who fathered scores of illegitimate children by the various women he seduced. In the words of the American historian David Woolman: "Silvestre was a real-life character as flamboyant as any to be found in the pages of a romantic novel". Silvestre was a very brave but reckless junior officer in Cuba, where he was seriously wounded during a cavalry action. However, as a general, he would be seen as hopelessly inept. His rapid rise through the ranks of the Spanish army was often attributed to the patronage of his best friend, King Alfonso XIII, who used his position as commander-in-chief to promote his favorite officers. After the Spanish–American War, Silvestre served as a military aide to the king, who became his patron. When Alfonso XII ascended to the Spanish throne in 1886, Spain could still be considered a world power, as Spain owned colonies in the Americas, Africa, Asia and the Pacific. The Spanish American War of 1898 was a traumatic event in Alfonso's childhood, which saw Spain defeated by the Americans, followed by the loss of Cuba, Puerto Rico, the Philippines, Guam, and shortly afterward, Spain sold the Carolines and Mariana islands to Germany. As a result, Spain's empire now consisted only of Spanish Guinea, in Central Africa, and some footholds on the Moroccan coast. Alfonso had taken the losses of the Spanish–American War very badly and supported the africanistas, who longed to conquer new imperial colonies in Northern Africa for Spain, to compensate for the lost colonies in the Americas and Asia. As a militarist educated by army officers and an africanista, Alfonso favoured swashbuckling, macho generals whom he saw as potential conquerors of Africa, leading to Silvestre's position as a royal favourite . Alfonso was fascinated by Silvestre's flamboyant and colorful personality, which made him popular "both with his troops and with the ladies."

=== Spanish Morocco ===
In 1904, after several postings in peninsular regiments, Silvestre was dispatched to the Spanish exclave of Melilla on the Mediterranean Riff coast of North Africa. Here he proved to be an excellent negotiator, but was a fierce and an unpredictable man as well. In 1912, he occupied Larache and in 1918 became the Commandant-General of Ceuta. As such he reported to the High Commissioner, a position that was filled by Dámaso Berenguer. Silvestre and Berenguer had once been friends at the military school, but they had fallen out, as Silvestre was senior on the officer's list and not prepared to take orders from the High Commissioner. Berenguer regarded Silvestre as reckless but was unable to restrain him largely because of his friendship with the king, who had the final say over promotions. Between 1913 and 120 Silvestre led several campaigns against Mulai Ahmed er Raisuni, a notorious North Moroccan brigand. Silvestre defeated Raisuni in October 1919 in the Battle of Fondak Pass. Although Raisuni and most of his followers managed to slip away, they eventually joined forces with the Spanish army against rival rebel leader Abd el-Krim. Raisuni's warriors played a key role in the Spanish capture of Larache and Arcila and in containing Abd El-Krim's offensives in 1923 and 1924, but he was taken prisoner by Abd El-Krim, who had him executed in 1925.

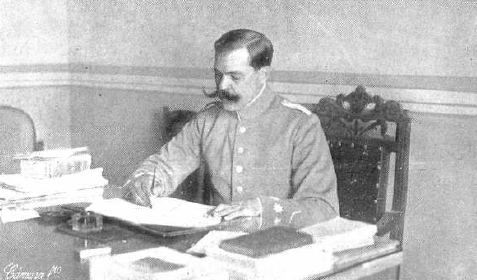
Silvestre as a colonel in his office in 1913

After stopping in Ceuta, Silvestre travelled to Meilila in 1920 to take up the position as Commandant-General of the city. From Meilila, in January 1921, he led the Riff invasion to destroy the local resistance, now led by Abd el-Krim. Berenguer commanded from his headquarters at Tétouan, south of Ceuta, and Silvestre was based at Meilila, 130 miles away, which adversely affected the quality of communication between them. In March 1921, Silvestre met Berenguer aboard the cruiser Princesa de Asturias to plan the operations in spring. Silvestre disregarded the Moroccans as a serious enemy, said he had all the troops and equipment that he needed, and stated that: "The only way to succeed in Morocco is to cut off the heads of all the Moors". French Marshal Hubert Lyautey, who commanded the forces in French Morocco, complained that the Spanish lacked cultural sensitivity and often gratuitously offended the Islamic traditions of the Moroccans by openly engaging the services of the ubiquitous prostitutes, who followed the Spanish Army everywhere in Morocco; by engaging in harassment of Muslims on the streets; by dishonest and bigoted treatment of Moroccan tribal chiefs; and by all too often simply assuming that an "iron fist" approach was the best way to deal with the Moroccans. Lyautey criticized the Spanish Army in Morocco in general, but Silvestre exemplified it perfectly, with his arrogance that led him to dismiss the Moroccans as hopelessly inferior and his firm belief in the "iron fist".

Campaigning in Morocco was difficult since the Spanish soldiers were poorly trained and often demoralised. Silvestre's forces comprised 20,000 Spanish soldiers, as well as 5,000 regulares, as Moroccans in the Spanish Army were called. Of the Spanish troops, well over half were completely illiterate conscripts from the poorest side of Spanish society, who had been sent to Morocco with minimal training. Despite Silvestre's assurances that Spanish equipment was sufficient to defeat the Riffians, about three quarters of the rifles at the Melilla arsenal were in shoddy condition because of poor maintenance. A report from late 1920, which Silvestre had not bothered to read, warned that many of the rifles stored in the Melilla arsenal were unusable or more of a danger to the soldier who was firing them than to the enemy. The average Spanish soldier in Morocco in 1921 was paid the equivalent of US$0.34 per day and lived on a simple diet of coffee, bread, beans, rice and meat offcuts. Many soldiers bartered their rifles and ammunition at the local markets in exchange for fresh vegetables. The barracks that the soldiers lived in were unsanitary, and medical care at the hospitals, which were few in number, was very poor. Up in the mountains, Spanish soldiers lived in small outposts known as blocaos, which the American historian Stanley Payne observed: "Many of these lacked any sort of toilet, and the soldier who ventured out of the filthy bunker risked exposure to the fire of lurking tribesmen". Continuing a practice first begun in Cuba, corruption flourished in the venal Spanish officer corps; Goods intended for the soldiers were sold to the black market and the funds intended to build road and railroads in Morocco ended up in the pockets of senior officers. A shockingly high number of Spanish officers could not read maps, which explains why Spanish units so frequently got lost in the Riff. In general, studying war was not considered to be a good use of an officer's time, and most officers devoted their time in Melilla in words of the American journalist James Perry to "gambling and whoring, sometimes molesting the native Moorish women". Morale in the army was extremely poor, and most Spanish soldiers just wanted to go home and leave Morocco forever. Because of the prostitutes from Spain, who attached themselves in great number to the Spanish bases in Morocco, venereal diseases were rampant in the Spanish Army, which once contracted were often utilized as an excuse to evade service. Silvestre was well aware of the poor morale of his soldiers, but he did not regard it as a problem since he believed that his enemy was inferior by far, thus the problems afflicting his troops would be of no importance.

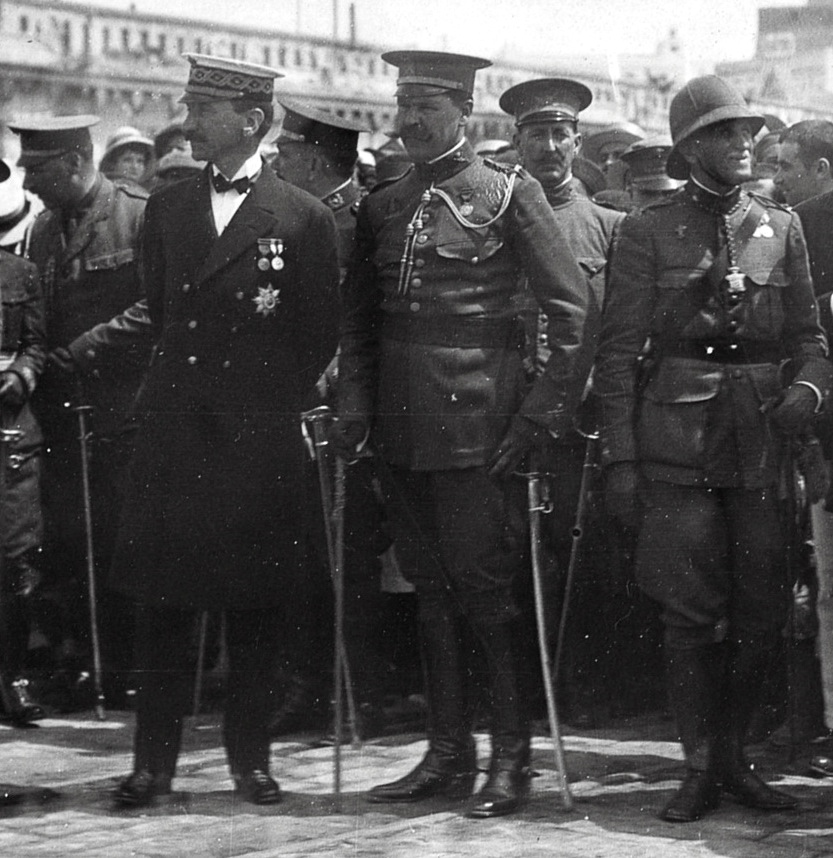
General Silvestre with other senior officers of the Spanish Armed Forces.

Silvestre had spread out his troops in 144 forts and blockhouses (blocaos) from Sidi Dris on the Mediterranean across the Riff to Annual and Tizi Azza and on to Melilla. A typical blockhouse held about a dozen men while the larger forts had about 800 men. Silvestre, again demonstrating his boldness and impetuosity, had pushed his men too deep into the mountains hoping to reach Alhucemas Bay without undertaking the necessary work to build a logistical support network capable of supplying his men out in the blocaos up in the Riff mountains. Krim had sent Silvestre a letter warning him not to cross the Amekran River, as he would likely die. Silvestre commented to the Spanish press about the letter: "This man Abd el-Krim is crazy. I'm not going to take seriously the threats of a little Berber caid [judge] whom I had at my mercy a short time ago. His insolence merits a new punishment". Krim allowed Silvestre to advance deep into since he knew that the Spanish logistics were, in the words of the Spanish historian Jose Alvarez, "tenuous" at best.

In late May 1921, Silvestre had his first inking of trouble, as he received reports that his supply columns he was sending up into the Riff were regularly being destroyed. As Silvestre had pushed his men very deep into the Riff, and his forts and blocaos held little in the way of food, the ambushes threatened to bring down the entire chain that Silvestre had built. On 29 May 1921, Silvestre wrote to Berenguer for the first time that the campaign against Krim might be more than a "mere kick in the pants" and that he needed more troops fast. However, in the words of Perry, "this stupid man" marched across the Amekran River to occupy the village Abaran on June 1, 1921. Most of the soldiers were regulares who promptly mutinied, murdered their Spanish officers and declared that they were now joining the jihad that Krim had proclaimed against the Spanish. After the debacle, Berenguer paid an emergency visit to Melilla to meet with Silvestre to "suggest" the latter to suspend his attempts to push over the Amekran River until Berenguer could "pacify" his zone south of Ceuta and start a supporting offensive from the west. Silvestre wanted to hear nothing of Berenguer's "suggestions" and said that unless he received a direct order to stop, he could continue his attempts to push Spanish power beyond the Amekran. Silvestre was so angry with the "suggestions" that he attempted to attack Berenguer and had to be restrained by the other officers. Though Berenguer continued to "suggest" to Silvestre caution in a steady stream of telegrams over the following days and advised no operations beyond the Amekran, he never ordered Silvestre to stop for fear of angering Silvestre's patron, Alfonso XIII, which meant that the stubborn Silvestre continued to press on.

The local resistance began to believe that they were able to defeat the Spanish when on June 1, 1921, it took the position from Abarrán, killing many Spanish soldiers in combat. On June 8, 1921, Silvestre again sent his men south of the Amekran to start building a fort at Igueriben. Krim then out a proclamation to all the Berber tribes of the Riff: "The Spaniards have already lost the game. Look At Abaran! They have left their dead mutilated and unburied, their souls vaguely wandering about, tragically denied the delights of Paradise!" The Riffians now surrounded the new Spanish base at Igueriben and used captured Spanish artillery to bring down fire on the Spanish. Then, Silvestre sent a telegram to Berenguer saying that the situation had become "somewhat delicate" and that he desperately needed more troops. Silvestre now started to worry, as he had much trouble sleeping and eating. However, Silvestre's doubts were quietened when King Alfonso sent him a telegram, whose first line was "Hurrah for real men!", and it urged his favorite general to stay the course and not to retreat. With that, any possibility of retreat vanished, as Silvestre would never displease the king.

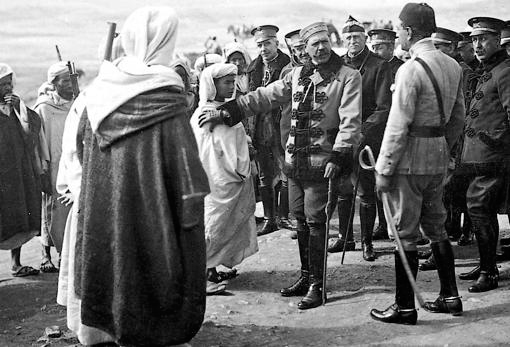
General Silvestre offers protection to a Moroccan child.

The Spanish garrison at Igueriben was cut off but could communicate with the fort at Annual via heliograph. From the heliograph, Silvestre learned that the men at Igueriben had no water and been reduced to drinking the juice from tomato cans, then vinegar and ink, and finally their own urine. With the dehydrated men of Igueriben in desperate condition, a relief force from Annual was sent down on July 19 but was ambushed and destroyed, with 152 Spanish killed. On July 21, Silvestre sent down another relief force of 3000 men, which was likewise ambushed and defeated.

==== Battle of Annual ====
After the fall of Igueriben on July 22, the rebels attacked the Spanish military camp. Silvestre, acting more and more erratically since the previous setbacks, ordered Major Julio Benitez to break out, which led to Benitez and most of his men being hacked to death by the Moroccan tribesmen, who rarely gave the Spanish much mercy. Only 11 survivors of Igueriben managed to reach the encampment at Annual, and 9 of them died within hours due to heat exhaustion. Having just arrived with his staff from Melilla on the 21st Silvestre "gnawed his mostache and swore mightily" upon learning of the final heliograph from the outpost. Matters were decided for Silvestre as Krim decided to follow up his victory at Igueriben by besieging the Annual camp, and a few hours later, his tribesmen had surrounded Annual. At that point, Silvestre, who having previously underestimated Krim now swung to the other extreme and called a council of his senior officers to announce he was ordering a general retreat back to the coast. Silvestre sent his last telegraphed message at about 4:55 a.m. in which he declared that he would start a retreat to Ben Tieb later that morning. Although facing an extreme shortage of ammunition Silvestre had little choice but to order a withdrawal, he inexcusably failed to organize an orderly retreat. Not least because of his machismo, as he was possibly unwilling to admit to his men that they would be about to retreat.

At about 10 am on 22 July 1921, the 5,000 men of the Annual started to march out of the fort without being adequately prepared during the few preceding hours. As the Spanish marched in a disorganized fashion with limited numbers of officers present to give them direction the Spanish army would suffer a devastating incoherence. As British historian Admiral Cecil Usborne describes: "Units broke up and became incoherent", as men started to head off in every direction amid "the terrible heat and dust of the Moroccan summer". With the Spanish receiving no orders, the Moroccans easily cut them down with writhing fire, which caused the Spanish army to descend into anarchy, with every man trying to save himself. The Riff tribesmen soon attacked the fleeing Spanish with swords, and others were "shot down like rabbits". According to some, the "smiling tribesmen" stood up from shelter to shoot down the Spanish "as if it was all a game to them". The Riffians almost used up all of their ammunition, but recompensated the loss with captured Spanish guns and ammunition. As a result, the tribesmen had more ammunition at the end of the battle than they initially had at the beginning. Soon, the Riffians had entered the perimeter of the Spanish camp at Annual, killing every Spaniard they encountered. The Riffians had no mercy and cut down not only the Spanish soldiers but also the Spanish prostitutes, which had followed the troops up into the Riff. While that was happening, Silvestre reportedly stood on the parapet of the Annual encampment, watching his army being destroyed. With the exception of one cavalry unit, the Cazadores de Alcántara, the entire garrison of about 5,000 men were lost. Silvestre allegedly further demoralized his men by yelling at them, "Run, run, the bogeyman is coming!" as they attempted to rally following their initial defeat. Silvestre's comments about the "bogeyman" was his only recorded contribution to the command of his army during the Annual rout. Of the 570 Spaniards who survived the "Disaster of Annual", the 326 who were taken prisoner were released in January 1923 after the Spanish state paid a ransom of four million pesetas. The survivors consisted of 44 officers, 236 soldiers, 10 civilians and 33 prostitutes and their children.

== Death ==
According to some witnesses, Silvestre, upon witnessing the disaster, went into his tent and committed suicide, shooting himself in the head. Whether dead by his own hand or, like most of his staff, killed in the turmoil of the retreat, the only remnant of Silvestre appears to have been his scarlet and gold general's sash. Captain Fortea, one of the few Spanish prisoners taken at Annual, reported that Abd el-Krim wore the sash during the pursuit. Abd el-Krim himself told the writer J. Roger-Mathieu that this and other insignia had been brought to him by one of his men. In addition to this, a Moroccan courier from Kaddur Nadar claimed eight days after the battle to have seen Silvestre's dead body lying on the battlefield face down, still recognizable by his sash and epaulettes.

A recent (2021) account of the Annual disaster by the Spanish military historian Javier Garcia de Gabiola summarises various accounts of Silvestre's end before concluding that he was probably shot down at the main exit from the camp after his senior staff officers were dispersed by rifle fire from the tribesmen gathered there.

A total of 15,000 Spanish soldiers fell in the days from July 22 to August 9; most died during the Battle of Annual (known as the Disaster of Annual to Spanish historians). Krim followed up his victory at Annual by laying siege to all of the blocaos in the Riff mountains, none of which had much food or water stored, and all of which he took. After the Annual rout, Spanish morale collapsed and there were very few attempts at organized resistance, with the commanders of every blocao making no effort for any organized retreat. On that final day, Silvestre's deputy, General Felipe Navarro y Ceballos-Escalera, surrendered with his men at the sprawling fort of Mount Arruit.
