= Mohamed Faouzi al-Karkari =

Sufi shaykh, founder of the Shadhili order

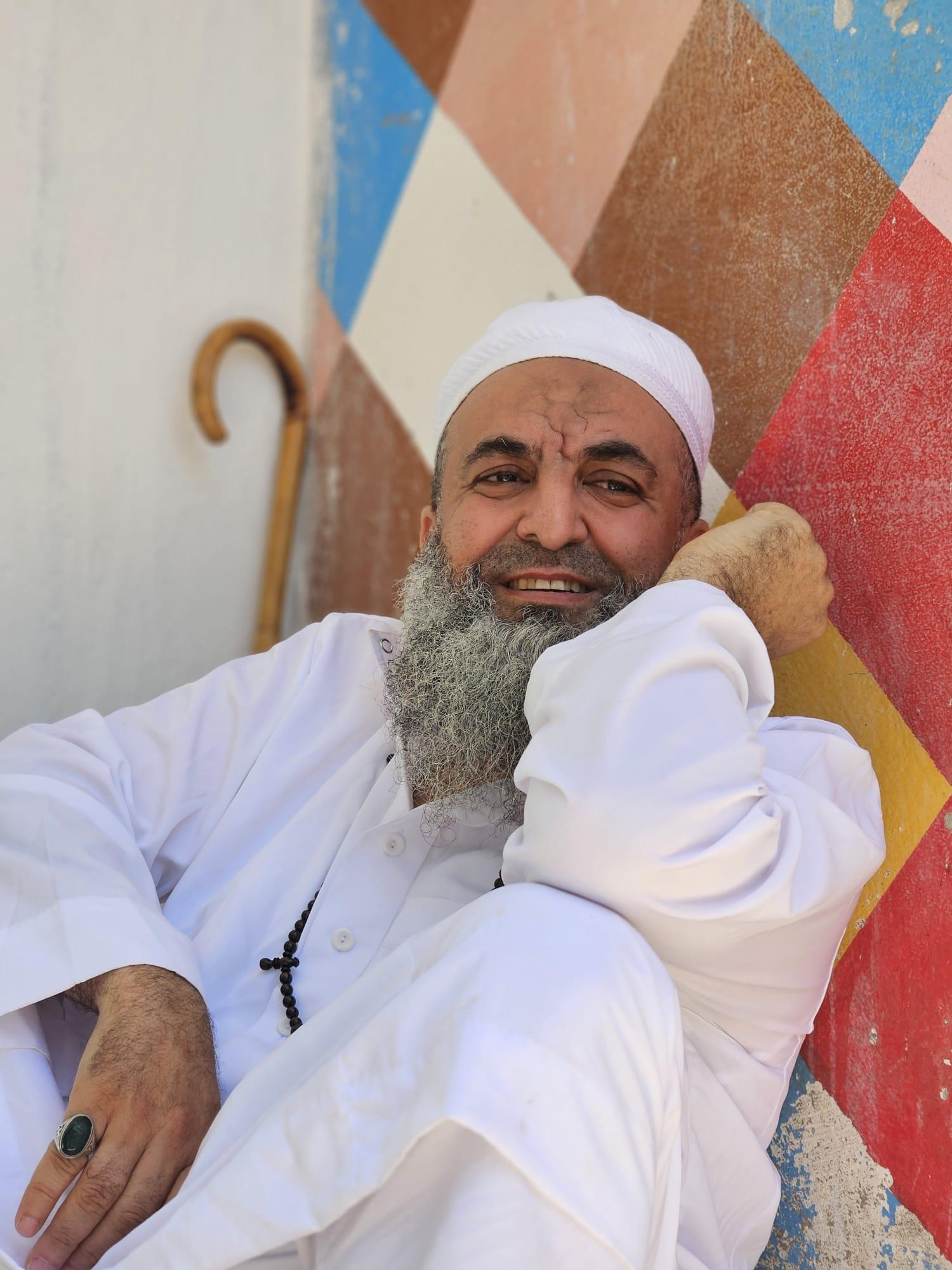
- Shaykh al-Karkari on the Day of Arafa (2023) at his zawiya in Nador.

Spiritual Master
- Born: Wednesday July 2, 1974; Temsaman, Morocco
- Venerated in: Islam
- Influences: Muhammad, Ahmad al-Alawi, Ibn Ata Allah al-Iskandari
- Tradition or genre: Shadhili Sufism
- Major works: Foundations of the Karkariya Order, The Sufi Path of Light, Introduction to Islamic Metaphysics

Mohamed Faouzi al-Karkari (born 1974) (in full: Sīdī Shaykh Abū ʿAbd Allāh Mohamed Faouzi b. Ṭayyib al-Karkari al-Idrīsī al-Ḥasanī) is a Moroccan Sufi shaykh and living founder of the Karkariya Tariqa, a newly formed branch of the prominent Shadhili order; whose mother zawiya is located in Al Aaroui, Morocco.

Karkari's Karkariya tariqa is physically distinguished by the practice of the wearing of the muraqqa˓a, a colorful patched cloak intended to generate humility in the disciple, as well to revive a Sunnah of Muhammad.

Karkari's tariqa has spread beyond Morocco to other regions of the Maghreb, and is beginning to proliferate internationally with burgeoning presence in France and North America. His tariqa is spiritually distinct from other Sufi orders and spiritual paths by being centered on the witnessing of the Light of God, as attested to by a multitude of the Shaykh's disciples. His disciples address him by the title Sīdī Shaykh.

Karkari made his first visit to the United States in May 2023, on invitation from the University of Chicago's Divinity School, lecturing on artificial intelligence from the perspective of Sufism, and other aspects of spiritual wayfaring unique to his tariqa. During his second tour of the United States in July 2024, Shaykh al-Karkari was invited by Stanford University's ATMA Club to speak in an interfaith dialogue on the topic of the spiritual life and the necessity of teachers in spiritual development.

== Biography ==
Karkari was born on Wednesday July 2, 1974, inside of a zawiya in Temsaman, Morocco.

Born to a Sharīf—Sīdī Mūlāy Ṭayyib al-Karkarī al-Idrīsī al-Ḥasanī—making Shaykh Al-Karkari a descendent of Muhammad.

His recent ancestors were themselves masters of Tasawwuf under the Shadhili, including his paternal grandfather Sīdī Mūlāy Ṭāhir al-Karkarī (initiated by Shaykh Ahmad al-Alawi himself), and his uncle and own spiritual master Shaykh Mūlāy al-Ḥasan al-Karkari.

Due to a trying experience in his late teens, Karkari left home, wandering across Morocco on foot. During this ten year physical and spiritual journey, termed a siyaha, al-Karkari learned tajrid or disengagement from other than God as well as total trust in God (tawakkul).

After receiving a dream beckoning him to return home, Karkari returned to his family in Nador, Morocco. Burning with the desire for repentance, al-Karkari formally entered into learning the sciences of tasawwuf, entering into ba'yah with his uncle and murshid Shaykh Mūlāy al-Ḥasan al-Karkari.

He would be one of only a few disciples of Shaykh al-Ḥasan, initiated into the central science of Sufism: the invocation and reading of the name of Allah.

Prior to his passing, al-Ḥasan would give Karkari permission to transmit the tariqa and train disciples as a shaykh.

== Publications ==
Several of al-Karkari's books and teachings have been translated into English, including:

- The Foundations of the Karkariya Order. Published: July 2, 2021, Les 7 Lectures. ISBN 9782930978567.
- The Sufi Path of Light. Published: February 23, 2023, Les 7 Lectures. ISBN 9782930978826.
- Introduction to Islamic Metaphysics. Published: August 11, 2021, Les 7 Lectures. ISBN 9782930978581.
- In the Footsteps of Moses: A Contemporary Sufi Commentary on the Story of God's Confidant (kalīm Allāh) in the Qurʾān. Published: January 18, 2021, Les 7 Lectures. ISBN 9782930978512.
- Sufism Revived: A Contemporary Treatise on Divine Light, Prophecy, and Sainthood. Published: January 25, 2021, Les 7 Lectures. ISBN 9782930978529.
- Candles on the Path. Published: December 10, 2023, Les 7 Lectures. ISBN 9782930978925.
