= Juan Picasso González =

Spanish general (1857–1935)

- Born: August 22, 1857; Málaga
- Died: April 5, 1935 (aged 77); Madrid
- Military career
- Rank: General
- Conflicts: Rif War

Juan Picasso González (22 August 1857 – 5 April 1935) was a Spanish military man and general who participated in the Rif War with the Spanish Army of Africa in late 19th century and early 20th century. He was a military investigation instructor known for "Expediente Picasso", an investigation report related to the historical defeat of the Spanish Army, some 20,000 soldiers and officers, of which some 8,000 were killed, against the Riffian rebels at the Battle of Annual, on July 1, 1921; known as The disaster of Annual.

He was the grand-uncle of the worldwide famous painter and sculptor Pablo Picasso, who was the son of one of his nieces.

Born at Málaga in 1857, he joined the Academia de Estado Mayor in 1876, where he was one of the brightest students and an accomplished horse rider. He participated in a military confrontation in the North African seaside town of Melilla in October 1893.

== The 1893 military confrontation on Melilla ==
Melilla, a Spanish autonomous city located on the north coast of Africa, was conquered by Pedro de Estopiñan in 1497, five years after the final conquest of the Nasri Spanish Kingdom of Granada, circa 1035 - 1492.

The town of Melilla was at that time ruled by the Kingdom of Fes, under the first Fes kingdom Sultan of the Wattasid dynasty Abu Abd Allah al-Sheikh Muhammad ibn Yahya (ruling 1472 - 1504), the successor of the Spanish - Berber Zenata dynasty of the Marinids. The Marinid dynasty was a Zenata Berber dynasty, 1215 - 1465, ruling what are now parts of Morocco, Algeria and Tunisia in the North African Maghreb being immediately threatened with reconquest by the Wattaside dynasty Berbers.

In the Early Modern Age, the Ottoman Empire neared to Fes after the conquest of Oujda in the 16th century. In 1554 the Wattasid Dynasty took Fes with the support of the Turks, and the city became a fairly loose vassal of the Ottomans, but the seaside town of Melilla remained, together with other further East Mediterranean strongholds conquered by the Spaniards going as far as Tripoli in the actual Libya under the military control of the Spaniards to block Ottoman expansion towards the West, the practice of piracy and slave trading and so on.

Even so, the Turks managed to conquest the inland town of Fes in 1579 under Ottoman Sultan Murad III. Fes, capital of the Fes Sultanate to which Melilla had been attached till the Spanish conquest of 1497 was finally conquered in 1579 under Ottoman Sultan Murad III.

Melilla was besieged again in 1694–1696 under Ismail Ibn Sharif (reigned 1672–1727), the second ruler of the Alaouite dynasty, the successor of his half-brother Al-Rashid of Morocco.

Between 1727 and 1745, no less than 15 Sultans were coming out of some bellicose ten children with different mothers fighting for pre-eminence, out of several hundred children from Sultan Ismail. It was the son of Abdallah IV, a.k.a. Abdallah of Morocco (ruled 1745 - 1757), Mohammed ben Abdallah "al-Khatib" (c. 1710-1790) (Arabic: محمد الثالث بن عبد الله الخطيب) was Sultan of Morocco from 1757 to 1790 under the Alaouite dynasty the one who tried to reconquer Melilla again, to no avail.

Worse still, Sultan Mohammed IV, Sultan of Morocco from 1859 to 1873 had to endure the Battle of Tétouan, and the conquest of Tétouan, 6 February 1861, at the Rif Northern mountains by the bellicose Spanish Army. The expeditionary Spanish force, which departed from Algeciras, was composed of 36,000 men, 65 pieces of artillery, and 41 ships, which included steamships, sailboats, and smaller vessels while Leopoldo O'Donnell, 1st Duke of Tetuan, Prime Minister of Spain, personally took charge of the expedition. It was a highly punishing expedition making part of the Hispano-Moroccan War (1859–1860).

When Mohammed IV died in 1873, Morocco was ready to be "protected" from the covetous eyes of the Spaniards, great losers of the American territories in the 1820s and 1830s by the French, conquerors of Algiers in 1830 and expanding by then further and further south of the Sahara. A forward-thinking friend of the French interests could be then Hassan I of Morocco, who was the Sultan of Morocco from 1873 to 1894.

The Northern Rif mountains Berbers, however, did not pay much attention to these political concoctions pressurized by the Spanish presence in their lands. In the long run, this French future monitoring could be accomplished better and more cheaply, from the Southern Moroccan territories of the Alaouite Sultans, rather ignored by the quarrelsome Berbers from the North, speaking Amazigh, perhaps further down the Rabat, with a view to West African influence on goods supplies and buying of French manufactures from Paris.

When Hassan I of Morocco died in 1894, his son and successor, Abdelaziz of Morocco was only 16 years old. Abdelaziz of Morocco, also known as Mulai Abd al-Aziz IV, served as the Sultan of Morocco from 1894 at the age of sixteen, only effective Sultan since 1900 until he was deposed in 1908.

It is with these limits and within these limits that the joint Spanish-French "protectorate" of Morocco at the beginnings of the 20th Century should be examined in the opinion of some historians.

Picasso died in Madrid.

== See also ==
- Picasso file
