= Massacre of Monte Arruit =

1921 Riffian killing of Spanish soldiers during the Rif War

- Part of the Rif War
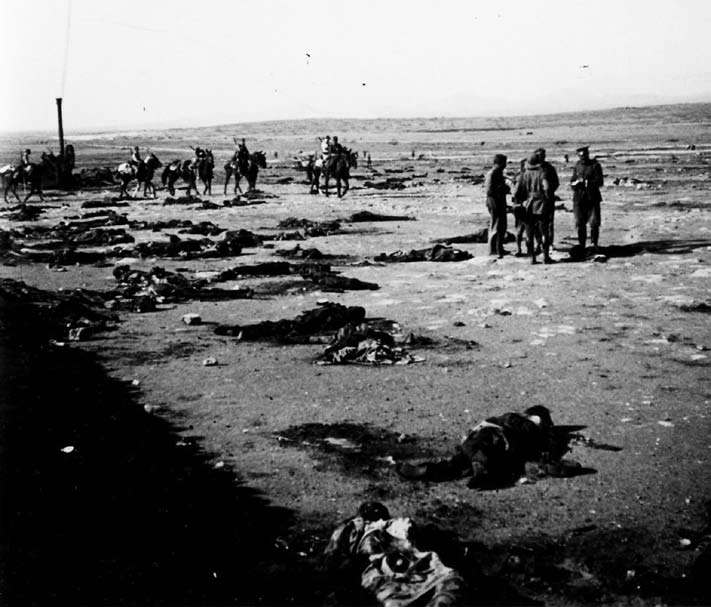
- dead spanish soldiers after the massacre
- Location: Al Aaroui Mountains, Morocco
- Date: 9th August 1921
- Target: Spanish Soldiers
- Deaths: over 2,000 killed
- Perpetrator: (Republic of the Rif) Riffian Tribes

The massacre of Monte Arruit took place on 9 August 1921 in Al Aaroui during the Rif War, when, after the July 1921 Battle of Annual, Riffian forces slaughtered most of the Spanish soldiers who had surrendered on that day.

== History ==
The Riffians forces advanced quite rapidly into a number of positions following the crushing defeat of the Spanish forces at the 22 July 1921 Battle of Annual and by early August they had already taken Zeluán and Nador. General Felipe Navarro had retreated to Arruit on 29 July, with around 2,201 ready soldiers and 252 wounded, joining the garrison of 964 soldiers.

After 12 days of siege, (Note: One of the losses during the siege was Fernando Primo de Rivera y Orbaneja who died on 5 August.) General Navarro was allowed to negotiate surrender terms. He agreed on 9 August on the delivering of the weapons in exchange for free passage. However, the Riffians failed to honor the agreement (either from treason from the Riffian leaders who had negotiated the terms or revolt by the disgruntled low-rank Riffians) and most of the remaining Spanish soldiers (over 2,000) were slaughtered on that day after the capitulation. About 400 (or 600), mostly officers—including General Navarro—were spared to be held for ransom.

The Riffian forces disobeyed orders from Abd el-Krim who had extolled the good treatment of prisoners and wounded.

Once after the process for recapture of the Spanish territory lost after Annual began on 10 October 1921, the troops led by José Sanjurjo who secured the position of Monte Arruit on 24 October were overcome by the rotting stench of the corpses.
