= Al Aaroui =

Al Aaroui ⵍⵄⵔⵡⵉ العروي
- Town
- Interactive map of Al Aaroui
- Coordinates: 35°00′N 3°1′W
- Country: Morocco
- Region: Oriental
- Province: Nador Province

Area
  - Total: 1,690 sq mi (4,390 km^{2})

Population (2024)
  - Total: 46,540
  - Density: 2,700/sq mi (1,060/km^{2})
- Time zone: UTC+0 (WET)
  - Summer (DST): UTC+1 (WEST)

Al Aaroui (Berber: ⵍⵄⵔⵡⵉ, Arabic: العروي) is a town in Nador Province, Oriental, Morocco. According to the 2024 census, it has a population of 46,540.

== Notable people ==
- Shaykh Mohamed Faouzi al-Karkari - Sufi shaykh and founder of the Karkariya Tariqa.
- Ahmed Jahouh – Professional footballer.

== See also ==
- Massacre of Monte Arruit
