= Battle of Annual =

1921 battle of the Rif War

Coordinates: 35.120°N 3.583°W

- Part of the Rif War
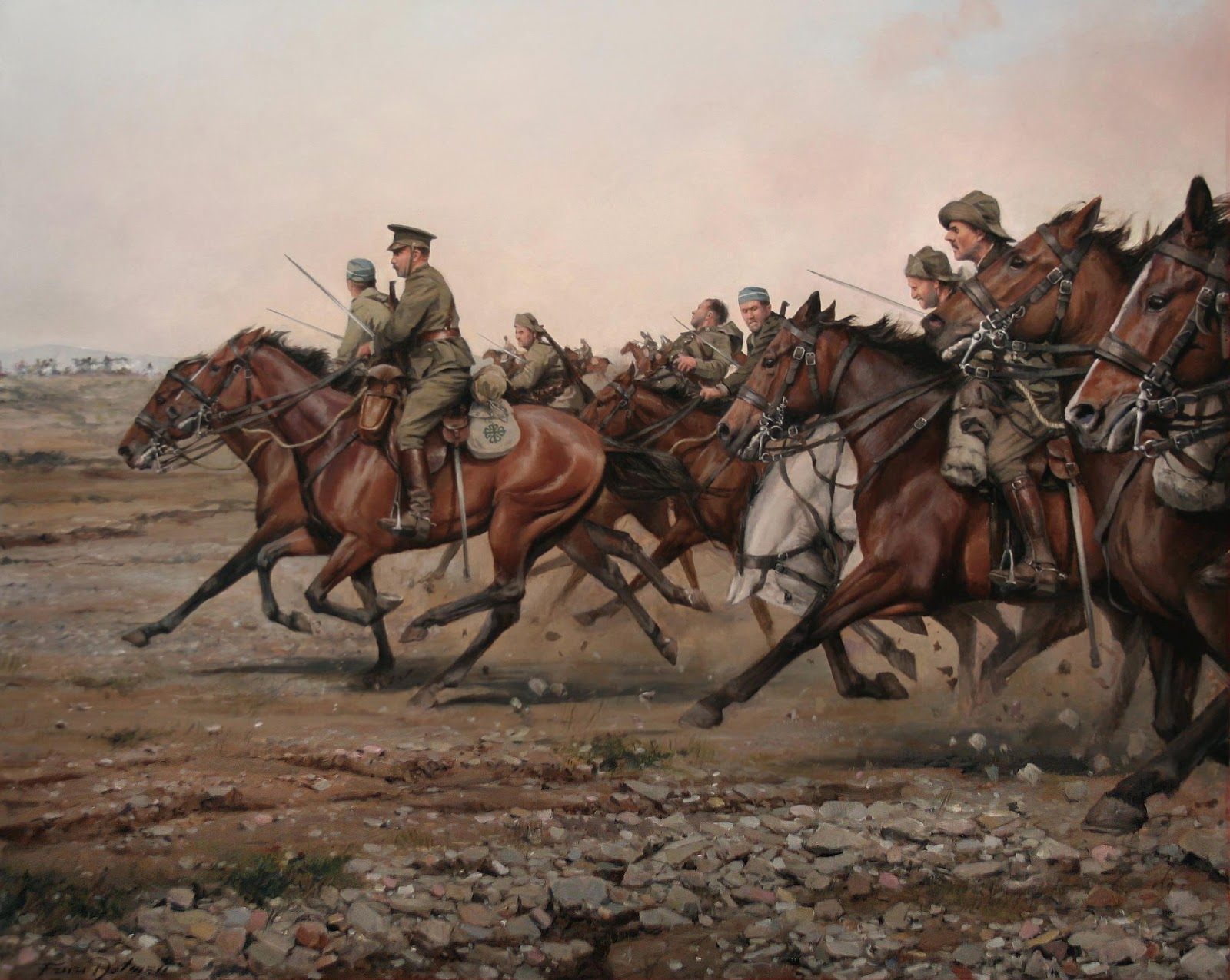
- 2013 painting of the battle by Augusto Ferrer-Dalmau
Date	22 July – 9 August 1921
Location	Annual, Morocco
Result	Riffian victory; Proclamation of the Republic of the Rif

Belligerents
(Republic of the Rif) Riffian tribes	Spain

Commanders and leaders
(Republic of the Rif) Abd el-Krim	Manuel Silvestre †

Strength
3,000	20,000–23,000

Casualties and losses
800 killed and wounded	13,192 killed or 12,000-19,000 killed

The Battle of Annual was fought on 22 July 1921 at Annual, in northeastern Morocco, between the Spanish Army and Riffian Berbers during the Rif War. The Spanish suffered a major military defeat, which is almost always referred to by the Spanish as the Disaster of Annual (Spanish: Desastre de Annual) which is widely considered to be the worst defeat ever suffered by the modern Spanish Army. It resulted in major political crises, the fall of several governments, a military dictatorship led by Miguel Primo de Rivera, the abdication of King Alfonso XIII and a complete reassessment of the Spanish colonial policy toward the Rif as the entire Spanish colonial enterprise was at one point threatened.

== Background ==
In early 1921, Spanish forces commanded by General Manuel Fernández Silvestre started an offensive into northeastern Morocco from the coastal regions that they already held. The advance took place without extended lines of communication being adequately established or the complete subjugation of the areas occupied. In the course of the Spanish offensive, the Spanish had penetrated almost 130 kilometres (81 mi) into the enemy lines, but during the hasty advances, neither defensible forts nor accessible water supply points had been put in place. The territory newly occupied by the Spanish was garrisoned only by small makeshift blockhouses (blocaos), each manned by a platoon of soldiers (typically 12–20). The outposts were widely spread, typically located in high places, distant from water sources and lacking good communications with the main positions. The ultimate goal of the campaign was to establish a permanent military presence on the shores of Al Hoceima bay, a strategic point between the western and the eastern Moroccan coast.

The Rifian irregular forces were commanded by Abd el-Krim, a former civil servant and translator in the Spanish Office of Indigenous Affairs in Melilla and one of the leaders of the tribe of the Aith Ouriaghel.

== Annual ==
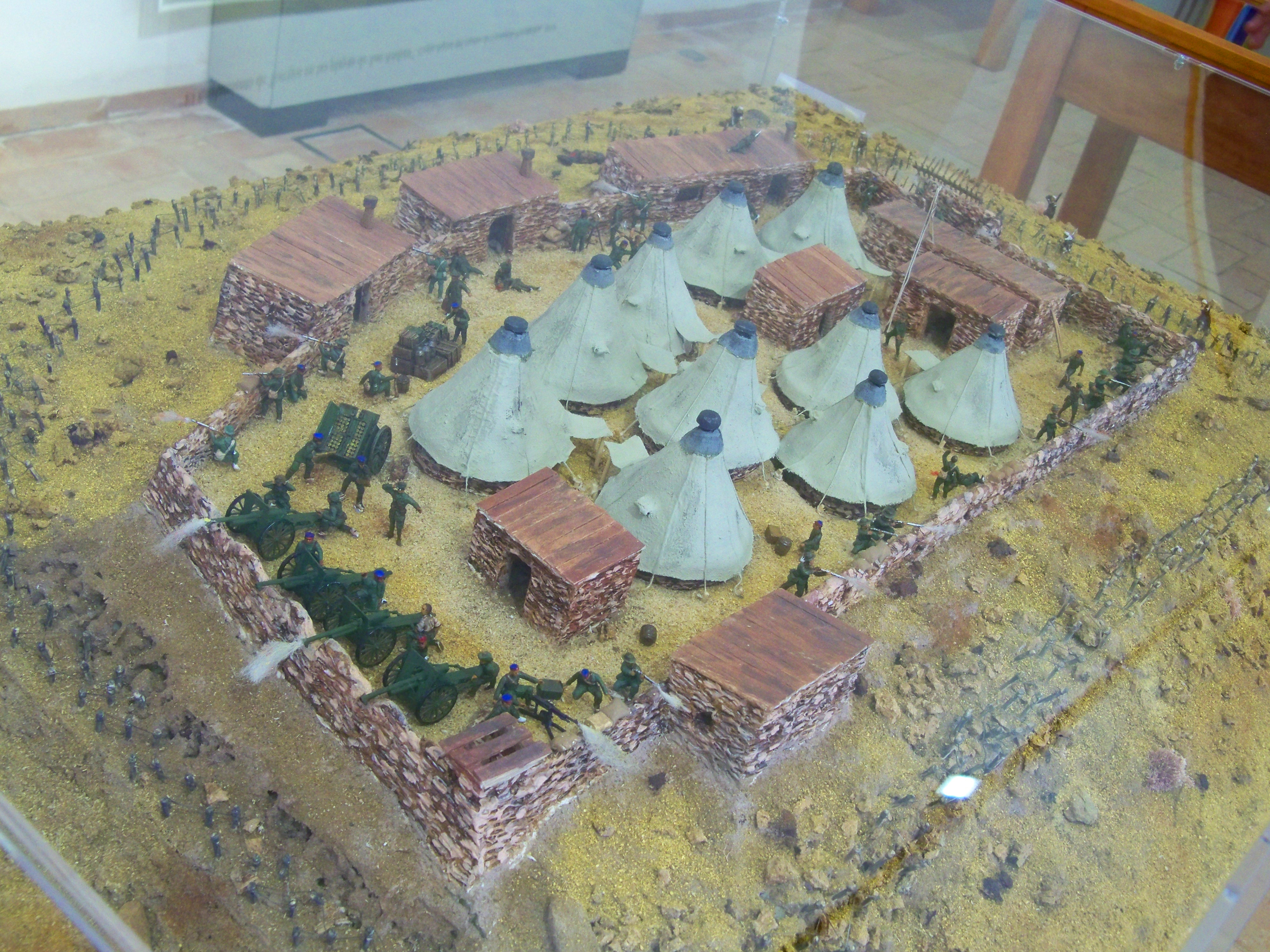
Diorama representing the siege of the Spanish fortified position at Igueriben

On 15 January 1921 the Spanish forces under Silvestre occupied the small village of Annual in the valley of Ait Oulichek, and established their main forward base for completing the occupation of eastern Morocco. Silvestre was considered an impetuous and aggressive personality, who was known to be a favourite of King Alfonso XIII. During his year in military command of the Melilla headquarters, Silvestre had doubled the amount of territory held by the Spanish in the central Rif.

Annual was situated about 60 kilometres (37 miles) to the west of Melilla. Surviving photographs show the Annual encampment itself to have been a sprawling tented encampment spread over several slopes in a starkly empty landscape.

On 1 June 1921, a Spanish outpost set up just hours before on Mount Abarrán, a 525-metre-high (1,722 ft) position east of Annual, was attacked and captured by Rifian guerrillas. The Spanish lost 179 soldiers killed.

On 5 June, Silvestre met General Dámaso Berenguer Fusté, Spanish High Commissioner in the protectorate, aboard the Spanish cruiser Princesa de Asturias off Sidi Idris. Berenguer rejected Silvestre's request for reinforcements.

Two days later, Silvestre decided to establish a new forward position, this time south of Annual, at the heights of Igueriben. The post was besieged by the Rifians on 14 July. The shortage of fresh water and the use of artillery by the Rifians forced the Spanish army to evacuate the position on 21 July, under heavy fire. Only 33 soldiers survived from a garrison of 300.

== Battle ==
On the eve of battle the Spanish garrison occupying the advanced encampment of Annual numbered 5,000 men. These were mostly Peninsula conscripts from the Ceriñola, Africa, Alcantara and San Fernando Regiments. In addition there were four batteries of artillery and about two thousand indigenous troops (1,400 Regulares and 400 native police all under Spanish officers, plus a harka of tribal allies under their own leadership)

On 22 July, after five days of skirmishing, the Spanish force was attacked by 3,000 Rif fighters. With ammunition low and the support base at Igueriben already overrun, General Silvestre, who had arrived at Annual only the day before, decided upon a withdrawal along the line of the previous Spanish advance. Just before 5 a.m. a last radio message was sent, reporting Silvestre's intention to evacuate Annual later the same morning. At about 10 a.m., the garrison began to march in column from the encampment in the direction of Melilla, but poor leadership and inadequate preparation meant that any hope of a disciplined withdrawal quickly degenerated into a disorganised rout. Hitherto reliable Moroccan regulares, indigenous police and allied tribesmen deserted to the Rifian forces, depriving the Spanish column of flankers and rear guard. The Spanish conscripts, under heavy fire and exhausted by the intense heat, broke into a confused crowd and were shot down or stabbed by the tribesmen. Only one cavalry unit, the Cazadores de Alcántara, kept in formation and was able to conduct a fighting retreat (see painting above), though suffering heavy casualties.

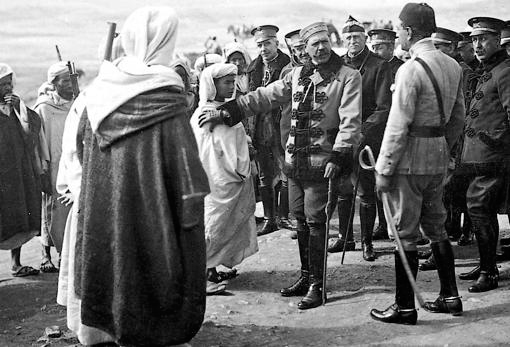
General Silvestre and staff 1921

The overstretched Spanish military build-up in the Eastern Spanish Protectorate in Morocco crumbled. After the battle, the Rifians advanced eastward and overran more than 130 Spanish blockhouses. The Spanish garrisons were destroyed without mounting a coordinated response to the attacks. By the end of August, Spain had lost all the territories that it had gained in the area since 1909.

=== Death of Silvestre ===
General Silvestre disappeared and his remains were never found. According to one report, Spanish sergeant Francisco Basallo Becerra from the Kandoussi garrison, an outpost east of Annual, identified the remains of Silvestre by his general's sash. A Moorish courier from Kaddour 'n Amar said that eight days after the battle, he saw the corpse of the general lying face down on the battlefield and still recognizable by his sash and insignia. Yet another account has Silvestre, still in Annual, shouting into the chaos "run, run little soldiers, the bogeyman is coming" before shooting himself.

== Spanish retreat ==
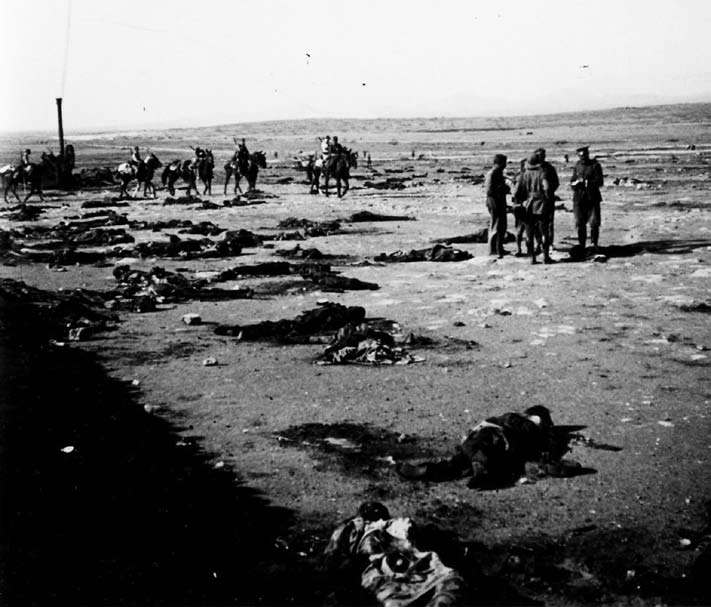
Spanish officers inspecting the remains of the garrison at Monte Arruit in January 1922

At Afraou, on the coast, Spanish warships managed to evacuate the garrison. At Zoco el Telata de Metalsa, in the south, Spanish troops and civilians retreated to the French Zone. Spanish survivors of the battle retreated some 80 kilometres (50 mi) to the spread-out fortified base of Monte Arruit, which was built between 1912 and 1916 and located 35 kilometres (22 mi) south of Melilla. There, a stand was attempted under the leadership of General Felipe Navarro. As the position was surrounded, and cut off from water and supplies, General Berenguer authorised its surrender on August 9. The Rifians did not respect the conditions of surrender and murdered 3,000 Spanish soldiers. General Navarro was taken prisoner, along with 534 military personnel and 53 civilians; they were ransomed some years later.

Melilla was only some 40 kilometres (25 mi) away, but the garrison there was in no position to help since the city was almost defenceless and lacked properly-trained troops. The exhausted and demoralised survivors of Annual who reached Melilla were in no condition to reinforce the existing garrison effectively. However, the Rifian forces had largely dispersed following the capture of Monte Arruit, leaving el-Krim with insufficient men to lay siege to Melilla. In addition, citizens of other European nations lived in Melilla, and he did not wish to risk international intervention. El-Krim later stated that to have been his greatest mistake.

Spain quickly assembled about 14,000 reinforcements from elite units of the Army of Africa, which had been operating south of Tetouan in the Western Zone. They mainly comprised units of the Spanish Legion who had been newly raised in 1920, and Moroccan regulares. Transferred to Melilla by sea, the reinforcements, under the command of General José Sanjurjo, enabled the city to be held and Monte Arruit to be retaken by the end of November.

Retreat of the Spanish troops to Melilla after the battle of Annual

The Spaniards may have lost up to 22,000 soldiers at Annual and in the subsequent fighting. The German historian Werner Brockdorff states that only 1,200 of the 20,000 Spanish troops escaped alive, but that estimate of losses is contradicted by the Spanish official inquiry. Rifian casualties were reportedly 800. The final official figures for the Spanish death toll, both at Annual and during the subsequent rout which took Rifian forces to the outskirts of Melilla, were reported to the Cortes Generales as 13,192 killed, including Moroccan colonial forces.

Materiel lost by the Spanish, in the summer of 1921 and especially in the Battle of Annual, included 11,000 rifles, 3,000 carbines, 1,000 muskets, 60 machine guns, 2,000 horses, 1,500 mules, 100 cannons, and a large quantity of ammunition. El-Krim remarked later: "In just one night, Spain supplied us with all the equipment which we needed to carry on a big war." Other sources give the booty seized by the Rifians as 20,000 Mauser rifles, 400 Hotchkiss machine guns, and 120 to 150 Schneider artillery pieces.

== Aftermath ==
The political crisis brought about by this disaster led Indalecio Prieto to say in the Congress of Deputies: "We are at the most acute period of the decline of Spain. The campaign in Africa is a total, absolute failure of the Spanish Army, without extenuation." The Minister of War ordered the creation of an investigative commission, led by General Juan Picasso González, which developed the report known as Expediente Picasso. The report detailed numerous military mistakes, but the obstructive action of various ministers and judges made it not go so far as to lay political responsibility for the defeat. In all, the defeat is often thought of in Spain as the worst of the Spanish army in modern times.

The disaster damaged morale among the remainder of the Spanish forces in Morocco, with officers starting to distrust their local auxiliaries about whom rumors of armed uprisings started to circulate. Among the Spanish people, there was despair and anger with the government over the defeat. Many Spaniards started to demand that Spain completely pull out of its remaining African colonies.

The reasons for the crushing defeat may lie with Silvestre's tactical decisions and the fact that the bulk of the Spanish army was formed by poorly trained conscripts. Popular opinion widely placed the blame for the disaster upon King Alfonso XIII, who, according to several sources, had encouraged Silvestre's irresponsible penetration to positions far from Melilla without having adequate defenses in his rear. Alfonso's apparent indifference to el-Krim's demand for ransom for the prisoners led to a popular backlash against the monarchy. (Vacationing in southern France, he reportedly said "Chicken meat is cheap" when informed of the Riffian request; other sources render the quote as "Chicken meat is expensive".) The crisis was one of the many that over the course of the next decade undermined the Spanish monarchy and led to the rise of the Second Spanish Republic.

The last Spanish military commander to mount any significant resistance during the battle was the General Felipe Navarro who was forced to surrender and was captured along with 534 military personnel and 53 civilians, all of whom were held by el-Krim at his headquarters in Axdir; of these, 326 survived the 18 months of captivity before eventually being released following negotiations undertaken primarily by members of the Indigenous Affairs Delegation, most prominently Gustavo de Sostoa and Luis de la Corte Luján, with the final conditions settled between el-Krim and Horacio Echevarrieta. The terms of release included the payment by Spain of 4 million pesetas, a huge amount for the time. Once the ransom was received, the captives were released on 27 January 1923.

Most of the area occupied by the Rifian tribes was eventually taken back by the Spanish Legion and the Regiments "Guipúzcoa" and "Otumba" led by General Sanjurjo in November 1921, and by an expedition led by General Damaso Berenguer in 1922.

On 2 July 2012, the cavalry regiment Cazadores de Alcántara was awarded the Laureate Cross of Saint Ferdinand by the Council of Ministers for its rearguard action in Annual.

== See also ==
- Picasso file
- Battle of El Herri, a similar battle during the Zaian War in which a French colonial force was defeated by the Zayane Berber confederation
- Battle of Wolf Ravine, another Spanish defeat similar to Annual
