= List of co-operative federations =

This is a list of co-operative federations. For a list of individual Co-operative Enterprises, please see List of cooperatives.

== International ==
- International Co-operative Alliance (ICA)
- World Council of Credit Unions (WOCCU)
- International Co-operative Agricultural Organisation (ICAO)
- Consumer Co-operatives Worldwide (CCW)
- International Co-operative Fisheries Organisation (ICFO)
- International Health Co-operative Organisation (IHCO)
- International Co-operative Housing Organisation (ICA Housing)
- International Co-operative and Mutual Insurance Federation (ICMIF)
- International Organisation of Industrial, Artisanal and Service Producers' Co-operatives (CICOPA)
- International Cooperative Banking Association. (ICBA)

== North America ==
- North American Students of Cooperation (NASCO)

=== Canada ===
- Alberta Community and Co-operative Association (ACCA)
- Arctic Co-operatives Limited
- BC Coop Association (BCCA)
- Canadian Co-operative Association (CCA)
- Canadian Worker Co-operative Federation (CWCF)
- Conseil Canadien de la Coopération (CCC)
- Federated Co-operatives
- Fédération québécoise des coopératives en milieu scolaire
- Ontario Co-operative Association
- Saskatchewan Co-operative Association

=== Mexico ===
- Caja Libertad S.C.L.
- Caja Popular Mexicana
- Confederación Nacional de Cooperativas de Actividades Diversas (CNC)
- Federación de Cajas Populares Alianza S.C. de R.L. de C.V.
- Federación Nacional de Cooperativas Financieras UNISAP S.C. de R.L. de C.V.

=== United States ===
- ACDI/VOCA
- CF Industries (demutualized 2005)
- CHF International
- CHS, Inc.
- Cooperation Jackson
- Credit Union National Association (CUNA)
- CUNA Mutual Group
- Farmland Industries (liquidated 2003)
- Federation of Egalitarian Communities (FEC)
- National Cooperative Bank (NCB)
- National Cooperative Business Association (NCBA) (formerly the Cooperative League of America)
- National Co+op Grocers (NCG)
- National Rural Electric Cooperative Association (NRECA)
- Northern States Co-operative League (NSCL, established 1921)
- NYC Network of Worker Cooperatives(NYC NOWC)
- Philadelphia Area Cooperative Alliance (PACA)
- Portland Alliance of Worker Cooperatives (PAWC)
- U.S. Federation of Worker Cooperatives (USFWC)
- Valley Alliance of Worker Cooperatives

== Europe ==
- Cooperatives Europe

=== Austria ===
- Oesterreichischer Verband gemeinnütziger Bauvereinigungen - Revisionsverband

=== Belarus ===
- Belarusian Republican Union of Consumer Societies (BELKOOPSOYUZ)

=== Belgium ===
- Arcopar
- Fédération Belge des Coopératives (FEBECOOP)
- Office des pharmacies coopératives de Belgique (OPHACO)
- P&V Verzekeringen

=== Bulgaria ===
- Central Co-operative Union (CCU)
- National Union of Workers Producers Co-operatives of Bulgaria

=== Croatia ===
- Croatian Association of Co-operatives

=== Cyprus ===
- Co-operative Central Bank Ltd.
- Cyprus Turkish Co-operative Central Bank Ltd
- Pancyprian Co-operative Confederation

=== Czech Republic ===
- Co-operative Association of the Czech Republic

=== Denmark ===
- Agricultural Council of Denmark
- Co-op Union of Denmark (DKF)
- FDB Consumer Co-operative Denmark

=== Estonia ===
- Estonian Co-operative Association (ECA)

=== Finland ===
- Pellervo Confederation of Finnish Co-operatives
- SOK Association SOKL

=== France ===
- Confédération Générale des Sociétés Coopératives de Production (CGSCOP)
- Confédération Nationale de la Mutualité, de la Coopération et du Crédit Agricoles (CNMCCA)
- Confédération Nationale du Crédit Mutuel
- Crédit Agricole S.A.
- Fédération Nationale des Coopératives de Consommateurs (FNCC)
- Groupe Crédit Coopératif
- Groupement National de la Coopération (GNC)

=== Georgia ===
- Georgian Consumer Co-operative Alliance (TSEKAVSHIRI)

=== Germany ===
- Bundesverband deutscher Wohnungsunternehmen (GdW)
- Deutscher Genossenschafts-und Raiffeisenverband (DGRV)
- Edeka Zentrale AG & Co. KG
- Konsumverband eG
- Zentralverband deutscher Konsumgenossenschaften (ZdK)
- Union Coop - Föderation gewerkschaftlicher Kollektivbetriebe (Union Coop)

=== Greece ===
- Panhellenic Confederation of Union of Agricultural Co-operatives (PASEGES)

=== Hungary ===
- Hungarian Industrial Association (OKISZ)
- National Federation of Agricultural Co-operatives and Producers (MOSZ)
- National Federation of Consumer Co-operatives & Trade Associations (AFEOSZ - Co-op Hungary)

=== Italy ===
- Associazione Generale delle Cooperative Italiane (AGCI)
- Confederazione delle Cooperative Italiane (CONFCOOPERATIVE)
- Lega Nazionale delle Cooperative e Mutue (LEGACOOP)
- Alleanza delle Cooperative Italiane

=== Ireland ===
- Co-operative Housing Irelan
- Credit Union Development Association
- Irish Co-operative Organisation Society
- Irish League of Credit Unions

=== Latvia ===
- Latvian Central Co-operative Union (TURIBA)

=== Lithuania ===
- Lithuanian Union the Consumer Societies

=== Malta ===
- Koperattivi Malta - Cooperatives Malta
- Malta Co-operative Federation (MCF)

=== Moldova ===
- Union of Consumer Societies

=== Netherlands ===
- Oikocredit - Ecumenical Development Co-operative Society
- Rabobank
- Sociale Coöperatie Soco Soco
- Moerwijk Coöperatie
- Southwest at its best
- FrieslandCampina

=== Norway ===
- Coop NKL BA
- Federation of Norwegian Agricultural Co-operatives (Norsk Landbrukssamvirke)
- Union of Co-operative Housing & Building Associations (NBBL)
- Tine (company) Dairy cooperative

=== Poland ===
- national Association of Co-operative Savings & Credit Unions (NACSCU)
- National Auditing Union of Housing Co-operatives
- National Auditing Union of Workers' Co-operatives (ZLSP)
- National Co-operative Council (NCC)
- National Supervision Union of Consumer Co-operatives (SPOLEM)
- National Union of Co-operative Banks (KZBS)

=== Portugal ===
- Confederaçao Nacional de Cooperativas Agricolas & Crédito (CONFAGRI)
- Confederation of Portuguese Co-operatives (CONFECOOP)
- Co-operative Sector Institute (INSCOOP)

=== Romania ===
- National Union of Consumer Co-operatives (CENTROCOOP)
- National Union of Handicraft & Production Co-operatives of Romania (UCECOM)
- National Union of Agricultural Cooperatives from the Crop Sector (UNCSV)

=== Russia ===
- Central Union of Consumer Societies (CENTROSOJUZ)
- International Council of Consumer Co-operatives (CONSUMINTER)
- Koopvneshtorg Ltd. (COOP TRADE)
- Moscow Regional Union of Consumer Societies

=== Serbia ===
- Co-operative Union of Serbia
- Co-operative Union of Yugoslavia

=== Slovakia ===
- Co-operative Union of the Slovak Republic

=== Slovenia ===
- Co-operative Union of Slovenia

=== Spain ===
- Confederació de Cooperativas de Catalunya
- Confederación de Cooperativas Agrarias de España (CCAE)
- Confederación de Cooperativas de Euskadi
- Confederación Empresarial de Economia Social (CEPES)
- Confederación Española de Cooperativas de Trabajo Asociado (COCETA)
- Confederación Española de Cooperativas de Consumidores y Usuarios (HISPACOOP)
- Fundación Espriu
- Mondragon Corporation
- Unión Nacional de Cooperativas de Consumo y Usuarios de España (UNCCUE)

=== Sweden ===
- OKQ8 The Oil Company - OK, now joint with Q8
- Federation of Swedish Farmers (LRF)
- Folksam (FOLKSAM)
- HSB (Union of Housing Co-operatives)
- Kooperativa Förbundet (KF)
- Riksbyggen (Co-operative Housing Union)
- Swedbank, formed from a merger in the 90's between the cooperative The Workers Bank and The Farmers Bank

=== Switzerland ===
- Allgemeine Baugenossenschaft Zürich (ABZ)
- Fenaco
- Migros

=== Turkey ===
- Central Union of Turkish Agricultural Credit Co-operatives
- National Co-operative Union of Turkey
- Taris Union of Agricultural Co-operative Societies
- The Central Union of Turkish Fishery Cooperatives
- The Central Union of Turkish Forestry Cooperatives
- Turkish Co-operative Association
- Union of Sugar Beet Growers' Production Co-operative (PANKOBIRLIK)

=== Ukraine ===
- Central Union of Consumer Associations of Ukraine (UKOOPSPILKA)
- Ukrainian National Credit Union Association (UNCUA)

=== United Kingdom ===
- Association of British Credit Unions (ABCUL, Great Britain only)
- Confederation of Co-operative Housing
- Co-operative Party
- Co-operative Financial Services
- Co-operatives UK
- Employee Ownership Association
- Irish League of Credit Unions (federates Northern Ireland credit unions)
- Radical Routes
- Seeds for Change Network
- Students for Cooperation
- The Co-operative Group

== Oceania ==
=== Australia ===
- The Co-op Federation
- Business Council of Co-operatives and Mutuals (BCCM)

==== New South Wales ====
- Cooperative Federation of New South Wales

==== South Australia ====
- Cooperative Federation of South Australia

==== Western Australia ====
- Cooperatives WA

=== Fiji ===
- Fiji Cooperative Union

=== New Zealand ===
- New Zealand Cooperatives Association

== Africa ==
- Africa Confederation of Co-operative Savings and Credit Associations (ACCOSCA)

=== Benin ===
- Fédération des Caisses d'Epargne et de Crédit Agricole Mutuel (FECECAM)

=== Botswana ===
- Botswana Co-operative Association (BOCA)
- Botswana Savings and Credit Association (BOSCCA)

=== Burkina Faso ===
- Union Régionale des Coopératives d'Epargne et de Crédit du Bam (URC-BAM)

=== Burundi ===
- Fédération Nationale des COOPEC du Burundi (FENACOBU)

=== Cape Verde ===
- Fédération Nationale des Coopératives de Consommation (FENACOOP)

=== Cóte d'Ivoire ===
- Société Coopérative d'Abgoville (SCAGBO)
- Union Régionale des Entreprises Coopératives (URECOS-CI)

=== Egypt ===
- Central Agricultural Co-operative Union (CACU)
- Central Housing Co-operative Union (ARE)
- Central Productive Co-operative Union
- Higher Institute for Agricultural Co-operation
- Higher Institute of Co-operative Management Studies
- General Authority for Construction and Housing Cooperatives

=== Gambia ===
- Federation of Agricultural Co-operative Societies (FACS)
- National Association of Cooperative Credit Unions of The Gambia (NACCUG)

=== Ghana ===
- Ghana Co-operative Council (GCC)
- Ghana Co-operative Credit Unions Association (CUA)

=== Kenya ===
- CIC Insurance Group Limited (CIC) formerly The Co-operative Insurance Company of Kenya
- Co-operative Bank of Kenya (CBK)
- Kenya Union Of Savings and Credit Co-operatives (KUSCCO)

=== Mauritius ===
- Mauritius Co-operative Savings And Credit League

=== Morocco ===
- Office du Développement de la Coopération (ODC)

=== Namibia ===
- Co-operatives Advisory Board

=== Nigeria ===
- Co-operative Federation of Nigeria (CFN)

=== Senegal Union ===
- Nationale des Coopératives Agricoles (UNCAS)

=== Somalia ===
- Union of the Somali Cooperative Movements (UDHIS)
- Ururka Dhaqdhaqaaqa Iskaashatooyinka Soomaaliyeed (UDHIS)

=== Somaliland ===
- Somaliland Cooperatives Development institute (SLCDI)

=== South Africa ===
- National Co-operative Association of South Africa (NCASA)
- National Association For Cooperative Financial Institutions in South Africa (NACFISA)

=== Tanzania ===
- Tanzania Federation of Co-operatives (TFC)

=== Uganda ===
- Uganda Co-operative Alliance Ltd (UCA)
- Uganda Cooperative Savings and Credit Union (UCSCU)

=== Zambia ===
- Zambia Co-operative Federation (ZCF)
- Care Cooperative Savings and Credit Society Limited

== South and Central America ==
=== Argentina ===
- Confederación Cooperativa de la Republica Argentina (COOPERAR)
- Federación Argentina de Cooperativas de Consumo (FACC)
- Instituto Movilizador de Fondos Cooperativos (IMFC)
- Sancor Cooperativa de Seguros Ltda

=== Bolivia ===
- Confederación Nacional de Cooperativas de Bolivia R.L. (CONCOBOL)

=== Brazil ===
- Cooperativa de Consumo (COOP)
- Organização das Cooperativas Brasileiras (OCB)
- Unimed do Brasil, Confederaçao Nacional das Cooperativas Médicas

=== Chile ===
- Cooperativa del Personal de la Universidad de Chile Ltda (COOPEUCH)

=== Colombia ===
- Asociación Antioqueña de Cooperativas (CONFECOOP Antioquia)
- Asociación Colombiana de Cooperativas (ASCOOP)
- Casa Nacional del Profesor (CANAPRO)
- Confederación de Cooperativas de Colombia (CONFECOOP)
- Corporación Gimnasio Los Pinos
- Cooperativa del Magisterio (CODEMA)
- Cooperativa Médica del Valle y Profesionales (COOMEVA)
- Efectiva, Soluciones y Alternativas Comerciales
- Entidad Promotora de Salud (SALUDCOOP EPS)
- La Equidad Seguros Sociedad Cooperativa
- Progressa Entidad Cooperativa de los Empleados de Saludcoop

=== Costa Rica ===
- Banco Popular y de Desarrollo Comunal (BPDC)
- Federación de Cooperativas de Ahorro y Crédito de Costa Rica, R.L. (FEDEAC, R.L.)

=== Dominican Republic ===
- Consejo Nacional de Cooperativas (CONACOOP)
- Cooperativa Nacional de Seguros (COOPSEGUROS)
- Cooperativa Nacional de Servicios Multiples de los Maestros (COOPNAMA)
- Cooperativa Nacional de Servicios Múltiples de los Médicos (MEDICOOP)
- Cooperativa San Jose
- Instituo de Desarrollo y Credito Cooperativo (IDECOOP)

=== Ecuador ===
- Coopseguros del Ecuador S.A.

=== El Salvador ===
- Federación de Asociaciones Cooperativas de Ahorro y Crédito (FEDECACES)

=== Haiti ===
- Conseil National des Coopératives (CNC)

=== Honduras ===
- Cooperativa de Ahorro y Crédito "Sagrada Familia"
- Cooperativa Mixta Mujeres Unidas Ltda. (COMIXMUL)

=== Panama ===
- Confederación Latinoamericana Cooperativas de Ahorro y Crédito (COLAC)

=== Paraguay ===
- Confederación Paraguaya de Cooperativas (CONPACOOP)
- Cooperativa de Produccion, Consumo, Ahorro, Crédito y Servicios de Profesionales de la Salud Ltda (COOMECIPAR)
- Cooperativa Universitaria del Paraguay Ltda (CU)
- Federación de Cooperativas de Producción (FECOPROD)
- Panal Compañia de Seguros Generales S.A. (Propiedad Cooperativa)

=== Peru ===
- Confederación Nacional de Cooperativas del Perú (CONFENACOOP)
- Cooperativa de Ahorro y Crédito (COOPETROPERU)
- Cooperativa de Ahorro y Crédito de Trabajadores de Empresas de Luz y Fuerza Eléctrica y Afines (CREDICOOP Luz y Fuerza Ltda.)

=== Puerto Rico ===
- Cooperativa de Ahorro y Crédito de Arecibo (COOPACA)
- Cooperativa de Ahorro y Crédito de Lares y Región Central (LARCOOP)
- Cooperativa de Ahorro y Crédito de Médicos y Otros Profesionales de la Salud (MEDICOOP)
- Cooperativa de Ahorro y Crédito Dr. Manuel Zeno Gandia
- Cooperativa de Seguros de Vida de Puerto Rico (COSVI)
- Cooperativa de Seguros Múltiples de Puerto Rico
- Liga de Cooperativas de Puerto Rico

=== Uruguay ===
- Centro Cooperativista Uruguayo (CCU)
- Confederación Uruguaya de Entidades Coops (CUDECOOP)
- Cooperativa Nacional de Ahorro y Crédito (COFAC)

== Asia ==
- Asian Association of Confederations of Credit Unions (ACCU)

=== Bangladesh ===
- Bangladesh Jatiya Samabaya Union (BJSU)

=== Cambodia ===
- The Cambodia Community Savings Federation (CCSF)

=== China ===
- All China Federation Of Supply & Marketing Co-operatives (ACFSMC)

=== India ===
- Adarsh credit co-operative society ltd. (ACCS LTD)
- Andaman & Nicobar Islands Integrated Development Corporation Ltd. (ANIIDCO), Port Blair 744101
- Andhra Pradesh Dairy Development Co-operative Federation (APDDCF), Lalapet, Hyderabad 500017
- Bihar State Co-operative Milk Producers’ Federation
- The Eastern Railway Employees' Co-Operative Bank Ltd.
- Goa State Co-operative Milk Producers’ Union Ltd. Curti, Ponda 403401, Goa
- Gujarat State Co-operative Agriculture and Rural Development Bank Ltd., 489, Ashram road, Ahmedabad-9, Gujarat.
- Gujarat Co-operative Milk Marketing Federation Ltd. (GCMMF)
- Gujarat State Co-operative Cotton Federation. Ltd. Ahmedabad-9.
- Haryana Dairy Development Cooperative Federation Ltd. Sector 17-C, Chandigarh 160017
- Himachal Pradesh Co-operative Marketing and Consumers Federation (HIMFED), Shimla
- Indian Cooperative Credit Society Limited (ICCSL), Bengaluru
- Indian Farmers Fertiliser Co-operative (IFFCO)
- Kohima Dist Co-operative Milk Producers' Union Ltd., Milk Chilling Plant, Veterinary Compound, Burma Camp, Dimapur 797112
- Krishak Bharati Co-operative Ltd. (KRIBHCO)
- Karnataka Co-operative Milk Producers Federation (KMF), KMF Complex, Dr M H Marigowda Rd, D R College PO, Bangalore 560029
- Kerala Co-operative Milk Marketing Federation (KCMMF)
- Kerala State Co-operative Federation for Fisheries Development (Matsyafed), Karuvankonam, Thiruvananthapuram, Kerala.
- Southern Green Farming And Marketing Multi State cooperative society limited (Farmfed).
- Maharashtra Rajya Sahakari Dudh Mahasangh Maryadit, NKM International House, 178 Backbay Reclamation, B M Chinai Marg, Mumbai 400020
- Manipur State Co-operative Milk Processing & Marketing Federation Ltd., Kesiampat Junction, Imphal 795001
- National Agricultural Co-operative Marketing Federation (NAFED)
- National Co-operative Agriculture & Rural Development Banks' Federation Ltd (NCARDB Federation)
- National Co-operative Consumers Federation (NCCF)
- National Co-operative Union of India (NCUI)
- National Federation of State Co-operative Banks (NAFSCOB)
- National Federation of Urban Co-operative Banks & Credit Societies Ltd (NAFCUB)
- Orissa State Co-operative Milk Producers' Federation Ltd., D-2 Sahid Nagar, Bhubaneswar 751007
- Pondicherry Co-op Milk Producers’ Union Ltd., Vazhudavoor Rd, Kurumampet, Pondicherry 605009
- Punjab State Co-operative Milk Producers’ Federation Ltd., New City Center, Sector 34-A, Chandigarh 160022
- Pradeshik Co-operative Federation or U.P. Co-operative Federation (PCF), Lucknow
- Rajasthan Co-operative Dairy Federation Ltd., Saras Sankul, Jawahar Lal Nehru Marg, Post Box No 1003, Jaipur 302017
- Sikkim Co-operative Milk Producers’ Union Ltd., PO Tadong, Gangtok 737102
- Tamil Nadu Co-operative Milk Producers’ Federation Ltd., Aavin Illam, Madhavaram Milk Colony, Chennai 600051
- Tripura Co-operative Milk Producers’ Union Ltd., Agartala Dairy, Indranagar, Agartala 799006
- West Bengal Co-operative Milk Producers’ Federation Ltd. Sector III, Salt Lake City, Calcutta 700091

=== Indonesia ===
- Indonesian Co-operative Council (DEKOPIN)
- Institute for Indonesian Co-operative Development Studies (LSP2I)
- Credit Union Central of Indonesia (CUCO)

=== Iran ===
- Central Organisation for Rural Co-operatives (CORC)
- Central Union of Rural Co-operatives (CURACI)
- Iran Chamber of Co-operatives
- Iran Meat Cooperatives Association

=== Israel ===
- Central Union of Co-operative Societies
- Co-op Jerusalem of Alayers
- Kibbutz Movement

=== Japan ===
- Central Union of Agricultural Cooperatives (JA-ZENCHU/CUAC)
- IE-NO-HIKARI Association
- Japan Agricultural News (Nihon Nogyo Shimbun)
- Japanese Consumers' Co-operative Union (JCCU)
- Japanese Workers Co-operative Union (JIGYODAN)
- National Federation of Agriculture Co-operative Associations (ZEN-NOH)
- National Federation of Fisheries Co-operative Associations (ZENGYOREN)
- National Federation of Forest Owners Co-operative Associations (ZENMORI-REN)
- National Federation of University Co-operative Associations (NFUCA)
- National Federation of Workers & Consumers Insurance Co-operatives (ZENROSAI)
- National Mutual Insurance Federation of Agricultural Cooperatives (ZENKYOREN)
- Norinchukin Bank

=== Kazakhstan ===
- Union of Consumer Societies of Kazak (UCSK)

=== Korea ===
- Korean Federation of Community Credit Co-operatives (KFCCC)
- National Credit Union Federation of Korea (NACUFOK)
- National Federation of Fisheries Co-operatives (NFFC)
- National Forestry Co-operatives Federation (NFCF)
- Nong Hyup (National Agricultural Co-operative Federation, NACF)

=== Kuwait ===
- Union of Consumer Co-operative Societies (UCCS)

=== Malaysia ===
- Cooperative College of Malaysia
- National Cooperative Organisation of Malaysia (ANGKASA)
- Association of Co-operative Credit Union Malaysia (ACCUM)
- The Workers Confederation of Credit Society Ltd. (KKP)

=== Mongolia ===
- Mongolian Confederation of Credit Union (MOCCU)

=== Myanmar ===
- Central Co-operative Society Ltd. (CCS)

=== Nepal ===
- National Cooperative Bank Limited (NCBL)
- National Cooperative Federation of Nepal
- Nepal Federation of Savings & Credit Cooperative Unions (NEFSCUN)

=== Pakistan ===
- Karachi Co-operative Housing Societies Union

=== Palestine ===
- The Agricultural Co-operative Union

=== Philippines ===
- National Confederation of Cooperatives (NATCCO)
- Philippine Federation of Credit Cooperatives (PFCCO)
- Quezon City Union of Cooperatives (QCUC)
- Cooperative Union of Taguig and Pateros (COUNTPA)
- Victo National Federation of Co-operatives and Development Center (VICTO NATIONAL)

=== Singapore ===
- Singapore National Co-operative Federation (SNCF)

=== Sri Lanka ===
- Federation of Thrift & Credit Co-operative Societies Ltd in Sri Lanka (SANASA)
- National Co-operative Council of Sri Lanka (NCC)
- National Institute of Co-operative Development (NICD)
- Sri Lanka Consumer Co-operative Societies Federation Ltd (CoopfeD)

=== Thailand ===
- Co-operative League of Thailand (CLT)
- Credit Union League of Thailand Ltd.(CULT)
- The Federation of Savings and Credit Cooperatives of Thailand Ltd.(FSCT)

=== United Arab Emirates ===
- Abu Dhabi Co-operative Society (ADCOOPS)

=== Vietnam ===
- Vietnam Cooperatives Alliance (VCA)
- Central People's Credit Fund(CBV)

== See also ==
- Co-operatives
- Co-operative federation
- Market socialism
