= Settlement movement (Israel) =

Israeli kibbutzim, moshavim, moshavim shitufiim, and community settlements

Settlement movement (Hebrew: תנועת התיישבות) is a term used in Israel to describe national umbrella organisations for kibbutzim, moshavim, moshavim shitufiim, and community settlements.

Most kibbutzim are members of either the Kibbutz Movement or the Religious Kibbutz Movement, whilst most moshavim and community settlements are divided between the Moshavim Movement, Mishkei Herut Beitar, the Agricultural Union and HaOved HaTzioni. Many religious moshavim are affiliated with Hapoel HaMizrachi or Poalei Agudat Yisrael movements. Moshavim established after 1967 in the West Bank, outside the Green Line, are typically affiliated with Amana.

In the past there were several other organisations; the Kibbutz Movement was formed by a merger of the United Kibbutz Movement and Kibbutz Artzi in 1999, the former also formed by a merger of HaKibbutz HaMeuhad and Ihud HaKvutzot veHaKibbutzim in 1981. Most of the former organisations had political affiliations; HaKibbutz HaMeuhad was aligned with Ahdut HaAvoda and Ihud HaKvutzot veHaKibbutzim with Mapai and Labour.

To the extent that kibbutzim, moshavim, and moshavim shitufiim are agricultural cooperatives based on individual membership, the national settlement movements in Israel are viewed as secondary cooperatives or cooperative federations, whose members are lower-level primary cooperatives.
