= Ontario Co-operative Association =

- Company type: Cooperative federation
- Industry: Agriculture, financial services, insurance, legal services, marketing boards, transportation
- Founded: 2002
- Headquarters: Guelph, Ontario, Canada
- Area served: Ontario, Canada
- Key people: Erin Morgan, Executive Director; Joel Lalonde, Chair, Board of Directors
- Members: Credit Union Central of Canada, Gay Lea Foods Co-operative Limited, Central 1 Credit Union, The Co-operators, Growmark, Co-operative Housing Federation of Canada, Ag Energy Co-op, Co-op Cabs, Mountain Equipment Co-op, Ontario Natural Food Co-op, Ontario Student Co-op Association, Organic Meadow Co-op, UPI Energy LP, Ontario Worker Co-op Federation, Canadian Worker Co-op Federation, Organization for Parent Participation in Childcare and Education Ontario, Y's Owl Maclure
- Number of employees: 6
- Website: Ontario.coop

The Ontario Co-operative Association is a co-operative association serving co-operatives and co-op member organizations in Ontario, Canada. It is one of nine Anglophone provincial cooperative associations across Canada and collaborates with the Conseil de la coopération de l'Ontario (CCO), its Francophone counterpart in Ontario.

Originally formed as the Canadian Co-operative Association, Ontario Region in 1989, the Ontario Co-operative Association incorporated as an independent co-operative in 2002. The association has about 60 members across Ontario. On Co-op provides professional development, networking, programs and services to support its members and to develop and strengthen the Ontario co-operative movement. The Ontario Co-operative Association recognizes outstanding co-operative businesses and individuals through its Co-operative Spirit Awards.

The Ontario Co-operative Association programs and services are organized according to six keys areas: Co-operative Business Development; Co-operative Education (youth, public and sector); Government Relations; Member Engagement; Communications; and Co-operative Research. Some of its best known events and programs include the Provincial Co-op Conference, the Co-operative Young Leaders (CYL) program, Queen's Park Reception, and the Co-operative Spirit Awards.

The Ontario Co-operative Association maintains the province's only online database of co-operatives, credit unions and caisses populaires, called the Find a Co-op e-directory.

The Ontario Co-operative Association is a member of the Canadian Co-operative Association, the Agricultural Adaptation Council, the Association of Co-operative Educators, Co-op Zone, the Cooperative Communicators Association, The Foundation for Rural Living, and The Ontario Rural Council.
