= World Council of Credit Unions =

International trade association (e. 1971)

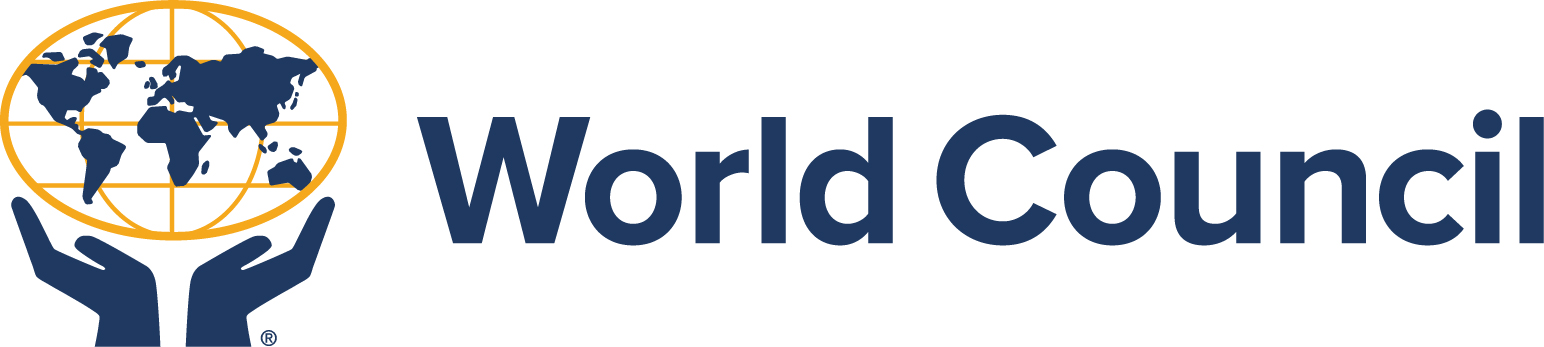
- Formation: January 1, 1971; 55 years ago
- Type: Trade Association, Development Agency, Cooperative Federation
- Headquarters: Madison, Wisconsin, United States
- President & CEO: Elissa McCarter LaBorde
- Website: www.woccu.org

The World Council of Credit Unions (WOCCU) is an international trade association and development agency for credit unions headquartered in Madison, Wisconsin. WOCCU aims to improve lives through credit unions and other financial cooperatives through advocacy, development and education. WOCCU's member associations account for over 86,450 credit unions in 118 countries with over 375 million members worldwide.

== History ==
WOCCU was incorporated on 10 November 1970 and officially commenced operations on 1 January 1971. WOCCU has worked with the United States Agency for International Development (USAID) and the Microfinance Investment Support Facility for Afghanistan (MISFA) to build Islamic investment and finance cooperatives in Afghanistan. In 2006, WOCCU received a $6.7 million grant from the Gates Foundation to develop credit unions in Africa and Latin America.

== See also ==
- Credit union
- History of credit unions
