= Casa Labra =

Pub in Madrid, Spain

Coordinates: 40°25′1.91″N 3°42′16.33″W

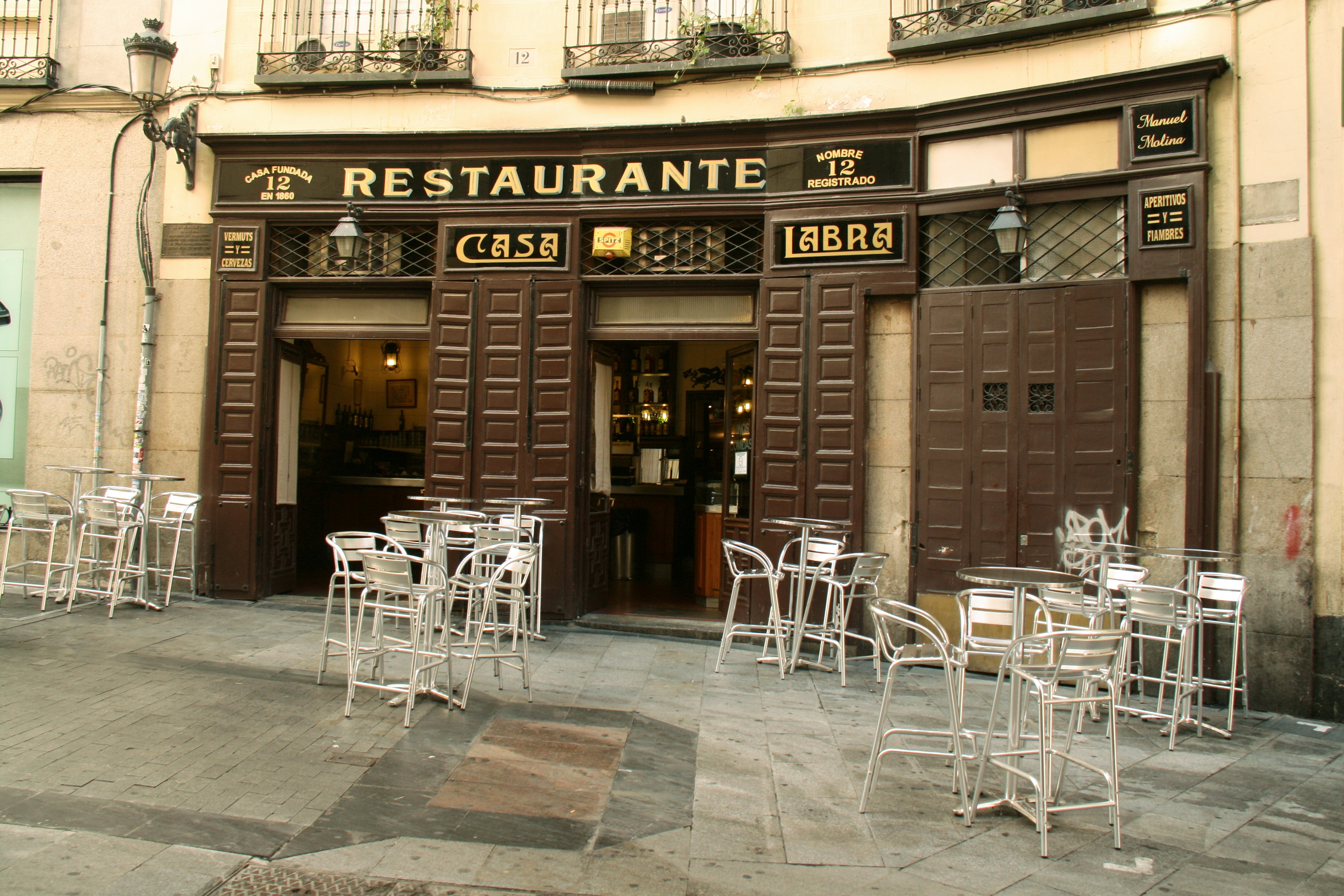
Casa Labra

Casa Labra is a pub in Madrid located close to the Puerta del Sol that was established and has been open since 1860. It is famous for being the site for the foundation of the Spanish Socialist Workers' Party by Pablo Iglesias on May 2, 1879.

== Features ==
Visitors to the bar usually eat standing (there are very few tables in the bar area), with tapas, fried cod or tuna with tomato being served. It keeps the service separate: the food (tapas) is ordered in a kind of box office with counter, and the drink in the bar itself. A sign that says "The one who drinks well does what he should" is highlighted, reminding customers of the obligation to pay what is consumed.

In an interior section are seats and table service. The place maintains the decoration of yesteryear. Since the beginning of the 21st century, an outdoor terrace has been installed that overlooks the street; this prevents people from eating standing up.
