= Cooperation Jackson =

Worker cooperative network in Jackson, Mississippi

- Type: Worker cooperative network
- Founded: May 1, 2014
- Headquarters: 939 W. Capitol St., Jackson, Mississippi, United States
- Area served: Jackson, Mississippi
- Key people: Kali Akuno (co-founder, co-director)
- Revenue: 2,177,347 United States dollar (2022)
- Total assets: 2,889,738 United States dollar (2022)
- Website: https://cooperationjackson.org

Cooperation Jackson is a network of worker cooperatives in Jackson, Mississippi, United States. It aims to develop a series of independent but connected democratic institutions to empower workers and residents of Jackson, particularly to address the needs of poor, unemployed, Black and Latino residents. The development of Cooperation Jackson has been heavily inspired by the Mondragon Corporation in Spain, which is also a federation of cooperatives, and by historical cooperative movements as described in works by W. E. B. Du Bois and in the book Collective Courage by Jessica Gordon Nembhard.

== History ==
Cooperation Jackson, which was created in 2014, strives to enact a vision of a radically democratic city of interconnected cooperatives and supporting institutions. Although the city of Jackson was already home to the Mississippi Association of Cooperatives, before Cooperation Jackson was formed, there were not many cooperative businesses located there. Kali Akuno, a co-founder and co-director of Cooperation Jackson, describes the organization's objective as bringing a strong focus on cooperative economics into an urban American context, in contrast to the more common rural context of agricultural co-ops and utility co-ops.

The organization has attempted to work within and outside of the government to achieve its goals. It has opposed what organizers describe as anti-democratic measures by the Mississippi state legislature, including austerity measures, an attempted takeover of Jackson–Medgar Wiley Evers International Airport, and an attempt to pass legislation to give control of the city government to Mississippi's governor. The organizers also struggle with working in an economically depressed city in the poorest state in the United States.

== Jackson-Kush Plan ==
Akuno has described the network as a key part of enacting the Jackson-Kush Plan. The plan, which was developed by the Malcolm X Grassroots Movement, involves building a strong base of community wealth, stability, racial equity, and economic democracy in Jackson. It has three planks, which are the "building of a broad-based solidarity economy, the building of people's assemblies, and the building of an independent black political party."

Organizers behind Cooperation Jackson believe that a solidarity economy rooted in democratic principles is a core requirement of developing the community's capacity and vision in making meaningful change. The Jackson-Kush Plan describes the role of this economy as a "transitional strategy and praxis to build 21st century socialism and advance the abolition of capitalism and the poverty and oppressive social relations that it fosters". The direct democracy of people's assemblies and local government electoral strategy are designed to both benefit and benefit from a strong cooperative system.

== Projects ==
=== Mutual aid ===
Cooperation Jackson has long focused on facilitating mutual aid projects. This has included creating and distributing personal protective equipment and providing an eviction support hotline in the wake of the COVID-19 pandemic. Members have also created community gardens and composting sheds on vacant spaces to aid their goal of providing enough organic food to provide for the calorie needs of 20,000 people in Jackson.

In 2021, Cooperation Jackson organizers began work with the Grassroots Center in Vermont to develop a land trust in that state in cooperation with the local indigenous population and to address food needs with regenerative agriculture. The project also seeks to serve as a safe haven for potential climate refugees who may be escaping inhospitable conditions in Mississippi.

=== Cooperative institutions ===
Several cooperatives operate as part of the Cooperation Jackson network. These include the lawn care business The Green Team, the organic vegetable farm Freedom Farms, the print and design shop Eversville Design & Print Shop, and The Center for Community Production, which operates a 3D printer. The Kuwasi Balagoon Center for Economic Democracy and Sustainable Development serves as a cooperative incubator and training center. Cooperation Jackson describes its development model as three-tiered: a community land trust as anchor, worker cooperative development, and solidarity institutions. As of 2024, the network was nearing completion of the Ida B. Wells Plaza, a planned business center to include Eversville Design & Print Shop, Chief Farms (a medical cannabis cooperative), and a cooperative grocery called People's Grocery, with the transition to People's Grocery marking the start of a third phase of development. All land acquisition and cooperative startups through Phase 2 were completed without taking on debt.

== See also ==
- List of employee-owned companies
