= Karachi Co-operative Housing Societies Union =

- Company type: Cooperative federation
- Founded: 1949
- Headquarters: Karachi, Pakistan
- Key people: Shamsuddin Uraizee,President Mohemmed Sharif Bhaiji, Managing Director
- Members: 24 Cooperative housing societies with over 100,000 members
- Website: https://kchsunion.com.pk

Karachi Co-operative Housing Societies Union (KCHSU) is a federation of housing cooperatives in Pakistan. The organization is composed of 24 cooperative housing societies with over 100,000 members. KCHSU is a member of the International Co-operative Alliance.

== History ==
KCHSU was established on January 25 of 1949 under the West Pakistan Co-operative Societies Act VII of 1925 to help the acquisition and lease of land from the government and other agencies. This allowed the Union to provide sub-licenses or sub-leases to their member societies. KCHSU was given 1,175 acres (4.76 km^{2}) in 1954 by Governor-General of Pakistan Malik Ghulam Muhammad through a licence agreement. The Union proceeded to develop this land for displaced people who came to Pakistan. The Union provided and maintained many municipal services until these were taken over by local government in the 1970s. The Union is currently developing another plot of land called Taiser Town.

In 1973, KCHSU allotted some land to the Overseas Cooperative Housing Society, one of its member organisations.
