= Spanish Socialist Workers' Party =

Spanish political party

Spanish Socialist Workers' Party Partido Socialista Obrero Español
- Abbreviation: PSOE
- Secretary General: Pedro Sánchez
- Deputy Secretary General: María Jesús Montero
- President: Cristina Narbona
- Founder: Pablo Iglesias Posse
- Founded: 2 May 1879 (147 years, 204 days)
- Headquarters: C/ Ferraz, 70; 28008, Madrid
- Newspaper: El Socialista
- Student wing: Campus Joven
- Youth wing: Socialist Youth of Spain
- Membership (2023): ▼152,913
- Ideology: Social democracy Federalism
- Political position: Centre-left
- National affiliation: Republican–Socialist Conjunction (1909–1919, 1931–1933); Alliance of the Left (1918); Popular Front (1936–1939); Democratic Senate (1977) (Note: In the Senate); Senate of Progress (since 2026) (Note: In the Senate)
- Regional affiliation: PSOM (historical)
- European affiliation: Party of European Socialists
- European Parliament group: Progressive Alliance of Socialists and Democrats
- International affiliation: Progressive Alliance; Socialist International
- Colours: Red
- Anthem: "Himno del PSOE" ('Anthem of the PSOE')
- Congress of Deputies: 102 / 350
- Senate: 76 / 266
- European Parliament: 18 / 61
- Regional parliaments: 492 / 1,424
- Regional governments: 4 / 19
- Local government: 20,805 / 66,976

Election symbol
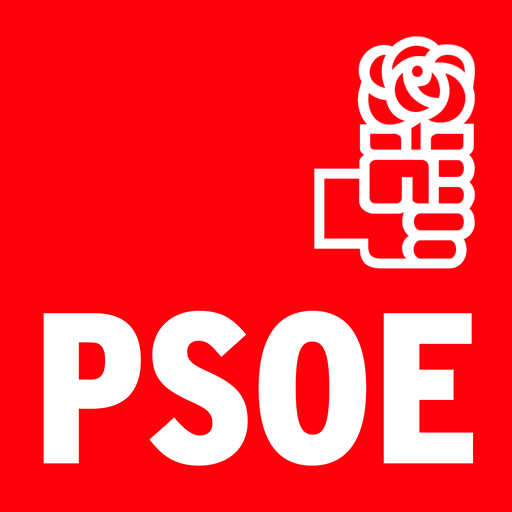

Website
- psoe.es

The Spanish Socialist Workers' Party (Spanish: Partido Socialista Obrero Español [paɾˈtiðo soθjaˈlista oˈβɾeɾo espaˈɲol], PSOE [peˈsoe] or [ˈsoe]) is a social democratic political party in Spain. The PSOE has been in government longer than any other political party in modern democratic Spain: from 1982 to 1996 under Felipe González, 2004 to 2011 under José Luis Rodríguez Zapatero, and since 2018 under Pedro Sánchez.

The PSOE was founded in 1879, making it the oldest party currently active in Spain. The PSOE played a key role during the Second Spanish Republic, being part of the coalition government from 1931 to 1933 and 1936 to 1939, when the republic was defeated in the Spanish Civil War. The party was then banned under the Francoist dictatorship and its members and leaders were persecuted or exiled; the ban was only lifted in 1977 in the transition to democracy. Historically Marxist, it abandoned the ideology in 1979. Like most mainstream Spanish political organizations since the mid–1980s, the PSOE has been considered by experts to have embraced a positive outlook towards European integration. (Note: See also labels by Gibbons 1999, p. 48: "This was in line with the PSOE's strongly pro-European policies"; and Campoy-Cubillo 2012, p. 163: "The Saharawi cause was embraced not only by the Europeanist PSOE".)

The PSOE has historically had strong ties with the General Union of Workers (UGT), a major Spanish trade union. For a couple of decades, UGT membership was a requirement for PSOE membership. Since the 1980s, the UGT has frequently criticised the economic policies of the PSOE, even calling for general strikes against the PSOE governments on 14 December 1988, 28 May 1992, 27 January 1994, and 29 September 2010, jointly with the Workers' Commissions, another major trade union in Spain. The PSOE is a member of the Party of European Socialists, Progressive Alliance and the Socialist International.

Both the trade unions and the left have often criticised the economic policies of the PSOE for their economically liberal nature. They have denounced policies including deregulation and the increase in precarious and temporary work, cuts in unemployment and retirement benefits, and the privatisation of large state-owned organisations and public services. The PSOE has traditionally attracted a higher share of female voters than its rivals. Same-sex marriage and adoption were legalised in 2005 under the Zapatero Government, and in 2023 a transgender rights bill was passed to allow more freedom in regards to gender identity.

The PSOE is a member of the Party of European Socialists, Progressive Alliance and the Socialist International. The PSOE's 20 Members of the European Parliament sit in the Socialists and Democrats European parliamentary group.

== History ==
=== Restoration regime (1879–1931) ===
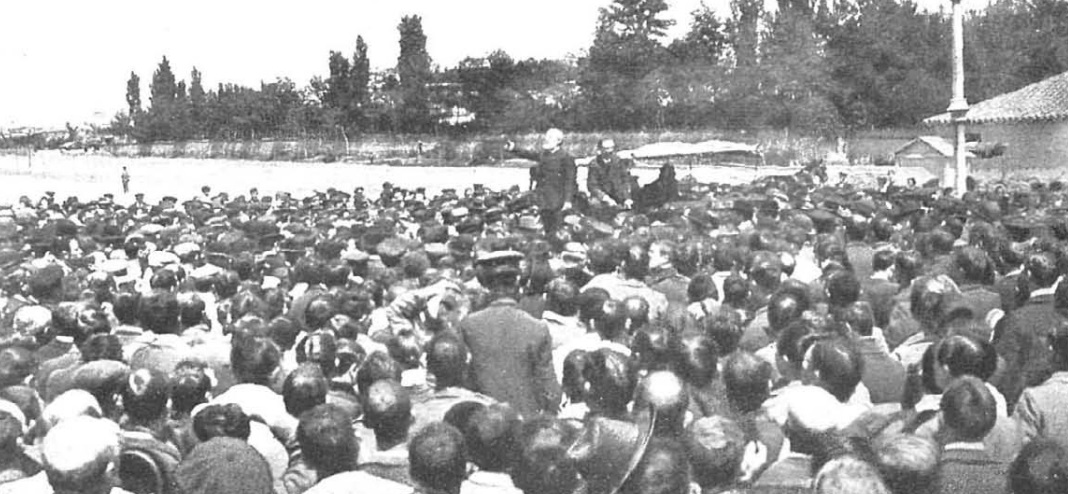
Pablo Iglesias Posse addressing the workers during a 1905 demonstration in Madrid

The PSOE was founded by Pablo Iglesias on 2 May 1879 in the Casa Labra tavern in Tetuán Street near the Puerta del Sol at the centre of Madrid. Iglesias was a typesetter who had previously come in contact with the Spanish section of the International Workingmen's Association and with Paul Lafargue. The first program of the new political party was passed in an assembly of 40 people on 20 July of that same year. The bulk of the growth of the PSOE and its affiliated trade union, the Unión General de Trabajadores (UGT) was chiefly restricted to the Madrid-Biscay-Asturias triangle up until the 1910s. The obtaining of a seat at the Congress by Pablo Iglesias at the 1910 Spanish general election in which the PSOE candidates presented within the broad Republican–Socialist Conjunction became a development of great symbolical transcendence and gave the party more publicity at the national level.

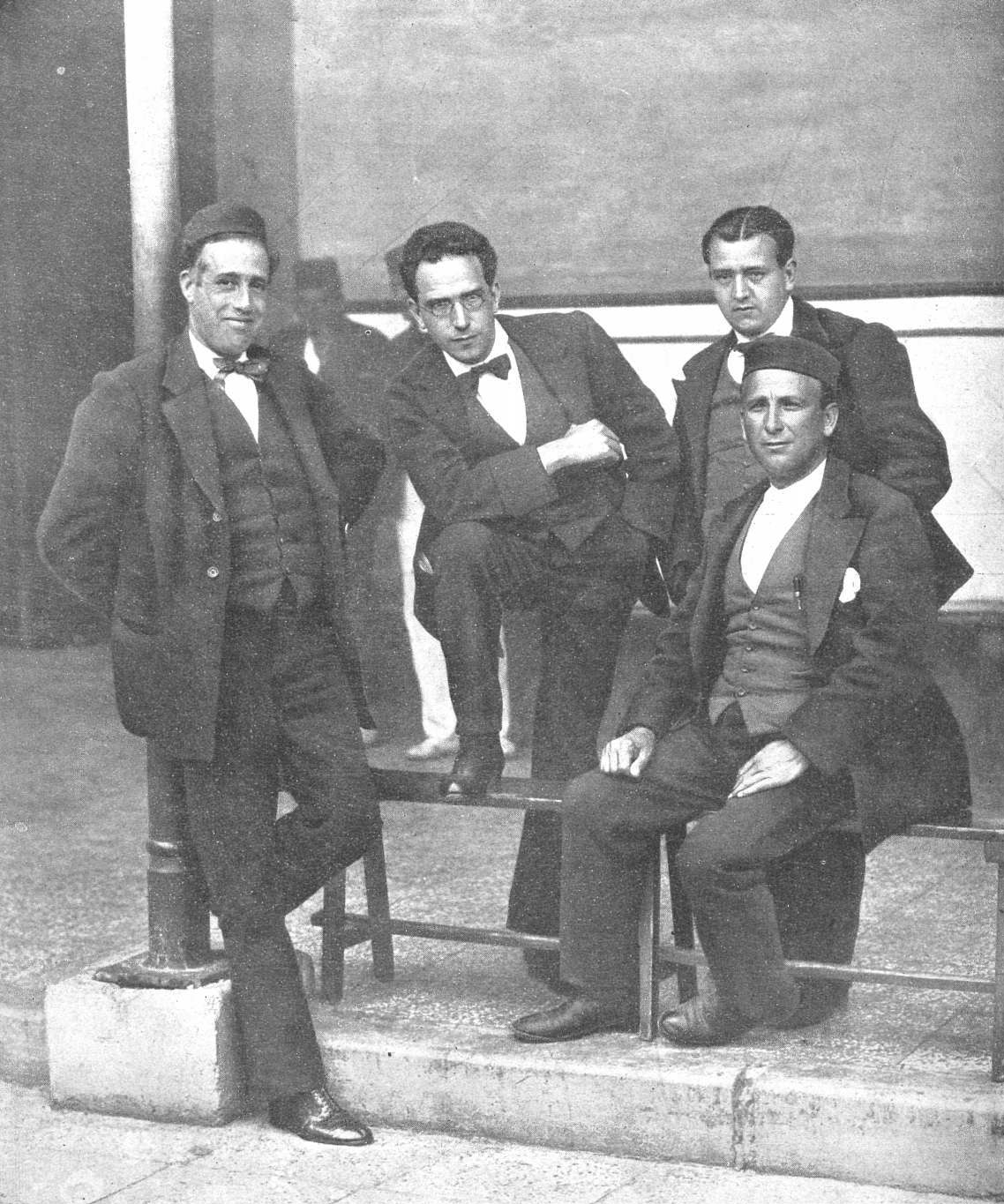
Julián Besteiro, Daniel Anguiano, Andrés Saborit and Francisco Largo Caballero in the prison of Cartagena in 1918

The PSOE and the UGT took a leading role in the general strike of August 1917 in the context of the events leading to the Spanish crisis of 1917 during the conservative government of Eduardo Dato. The strike was crushed by the army as a result of further undermining of the constitutional order. The members of the organizing committee (Julián Besteiro, Francisco Largo Caballero, Daniel Anguiano and Andrés Saborit) were accused of sedition and sentenced to life imprisonment. Sent to the prison of Cartagena, they were released a year later after being elected to the Cortes in the 1918 Spanish general election. During the 1919−1921 crisis of the socialist internationals, the party experienced tensions between the members endorsing the Socialist International and the advocates for joining the Communist International. Two consecutive splits of dissidents willing to join the Communist International, namely the Spanish Communist Party in 1920 and the Spanish Communist Workers' Party in 1921, broke away from the PSOE and soon merged to create the Communist Party of Spain (PCE). The PSOE was a member of the Labour and Socialist International between 1923 and 1940.

After the death of Pablo Iglesias in 1925, Julián Besteiro replaced him as president of both the PSOE and the UGT. During the 1923–1930 dictatorship of Miguel Primo de Rivera, corporatist PSOE and UGT elements were willing to engage in limited collaboration with the regime, against the political stance defended by other socialists such as Indalecio Prieto and Fernando de los Ríos, who instead advocated a closer collaboration with republican forces. The last years of the dictatorship saw a divergence emerge among the corporatist which was personified by Francisco Largo Caballero, who began to endorse the rapport with bourgeois republicans; and Julián Besteiro, who continued to show great distrust towards them. Besteiro's refusal to participate in the Revolutionary Committee led to his resignation as president both of the party and the trade union in February 1931. He was replaced as president of the party by Remigio Cabello.

=== Second Republic and Civil War (1931–1939) ===
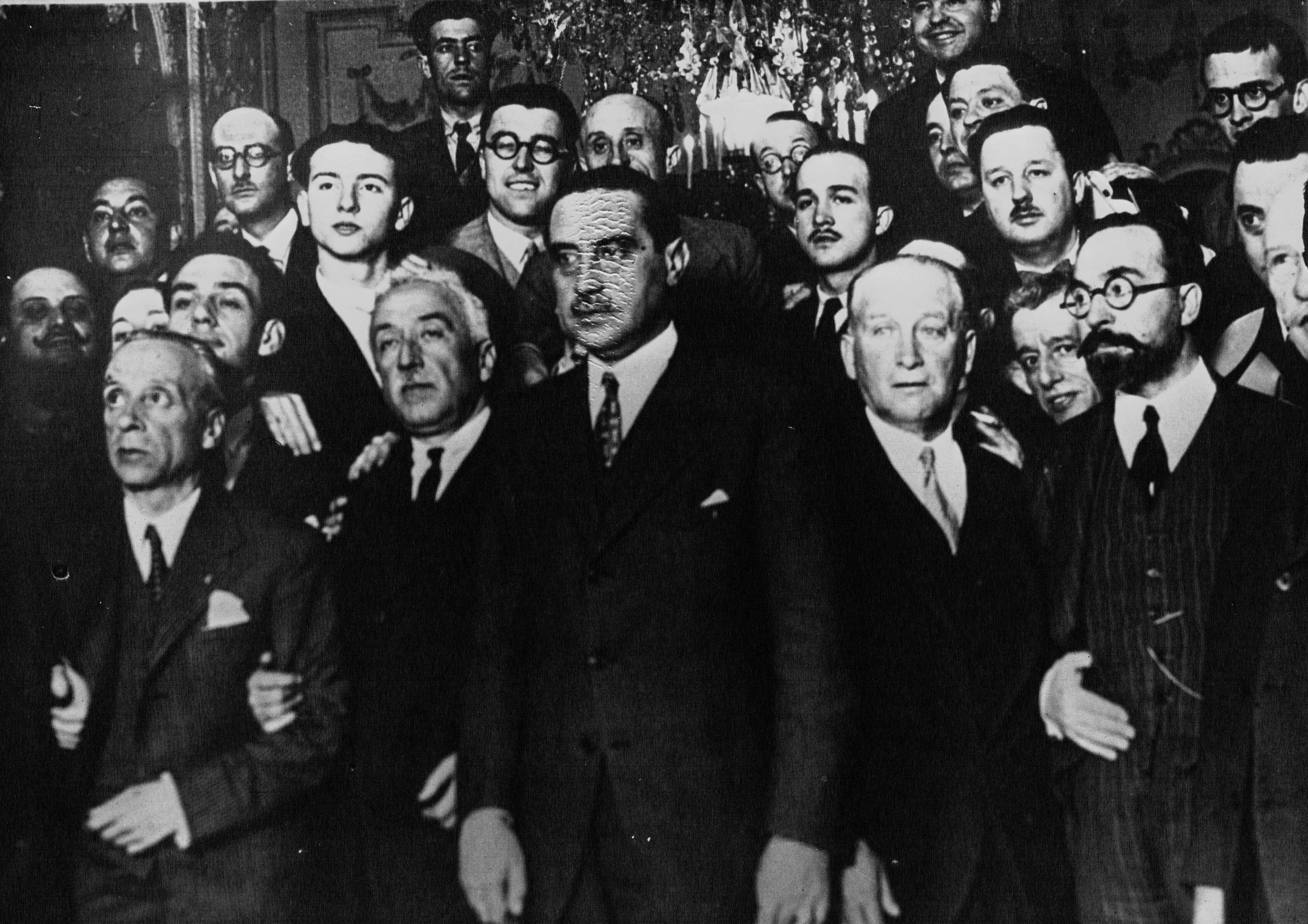
The PSOE entered the provisional government of the Second Republic in 1931 with Indalecio Prieto, Fernando de los Ríos and Largo Caballero as ministers

After the proclamation of the Second Spanish Republic on 14 April 1931, three PSOE members were included in the cabinet of the provisional government, namely Indalecio Prieto (Finance), Fernando de los Ríos (Education) and Francisco Largo Caballero (Labour). The socialist presence remained in the rest of cabinets of the Social-Azañist Biennium (1931–1933).

After the November 1933 general election which marked a win for the centre-right forces in a climate of increasing polarization and growing unemployment, along with a desire to make amends for the mistake of not having sided with the republicans in the election against the united right, Largo Caballero adopted a revolutionary rhetoric, calling for violent revolution and a transitionary dictatorship of the proletariat. Indalecio Prieto had also participated in the increasingly aggressive rhetoric, having already condemned the heavy-hand repression of the December 1933 largely anarchist uprising by the government, that has been cheered on by the Spanish Confederation of Autonomous Rights (CEDA) leaders in parliament. The Socialist Youth of Spain (JSE) also engaged in a shrill revolutionary rhetoric, while Besteiro firmly opposed the insurrectionary drift of the militancy.

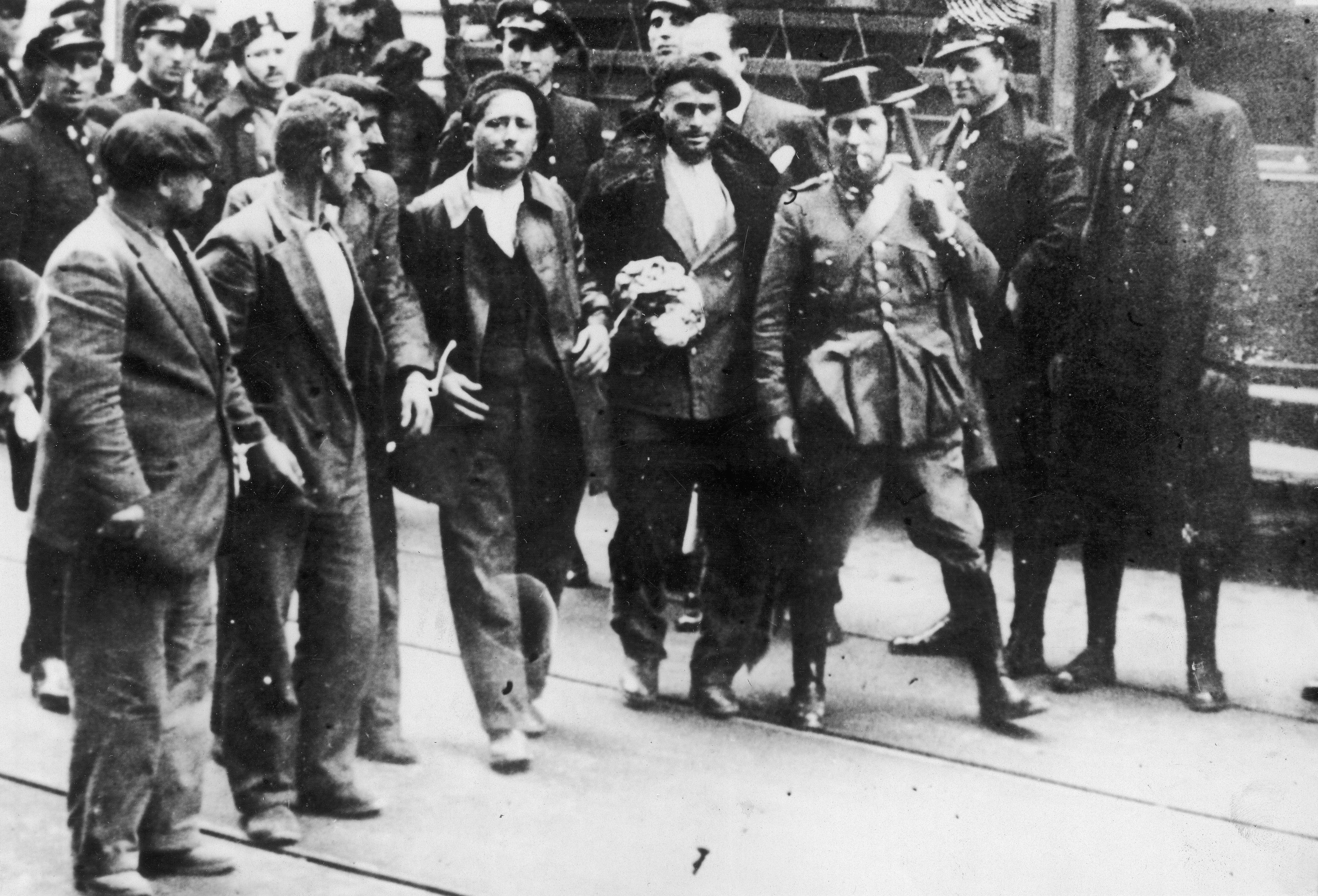
Workers arrested by civil guards and assault guards during the 1934 Asturian revolutionary strike

The formation of a new cabinet in October 1934 (including CEDA ministers) was perceived among the left as a reaction, because the CEDA party was perceived as being indistinguishable from contemporary fascism to most workers, while CEDA leader Gil-Robles had advocated the establishment of a corporative state in the 1933 electoral campaign. The UGT called for a nationwide general strike for 5 October, which developed into a full-blown insurrection (the Revolution of 1934) in the mining region of Asturias, and was vocally supported by socialists such as Largo Caballero and Prieto. Most PSOE and UGT leaders were jailed after the end of the revolt, whose repression was entrusted to generals Francisco Franco and Manuel Goded.

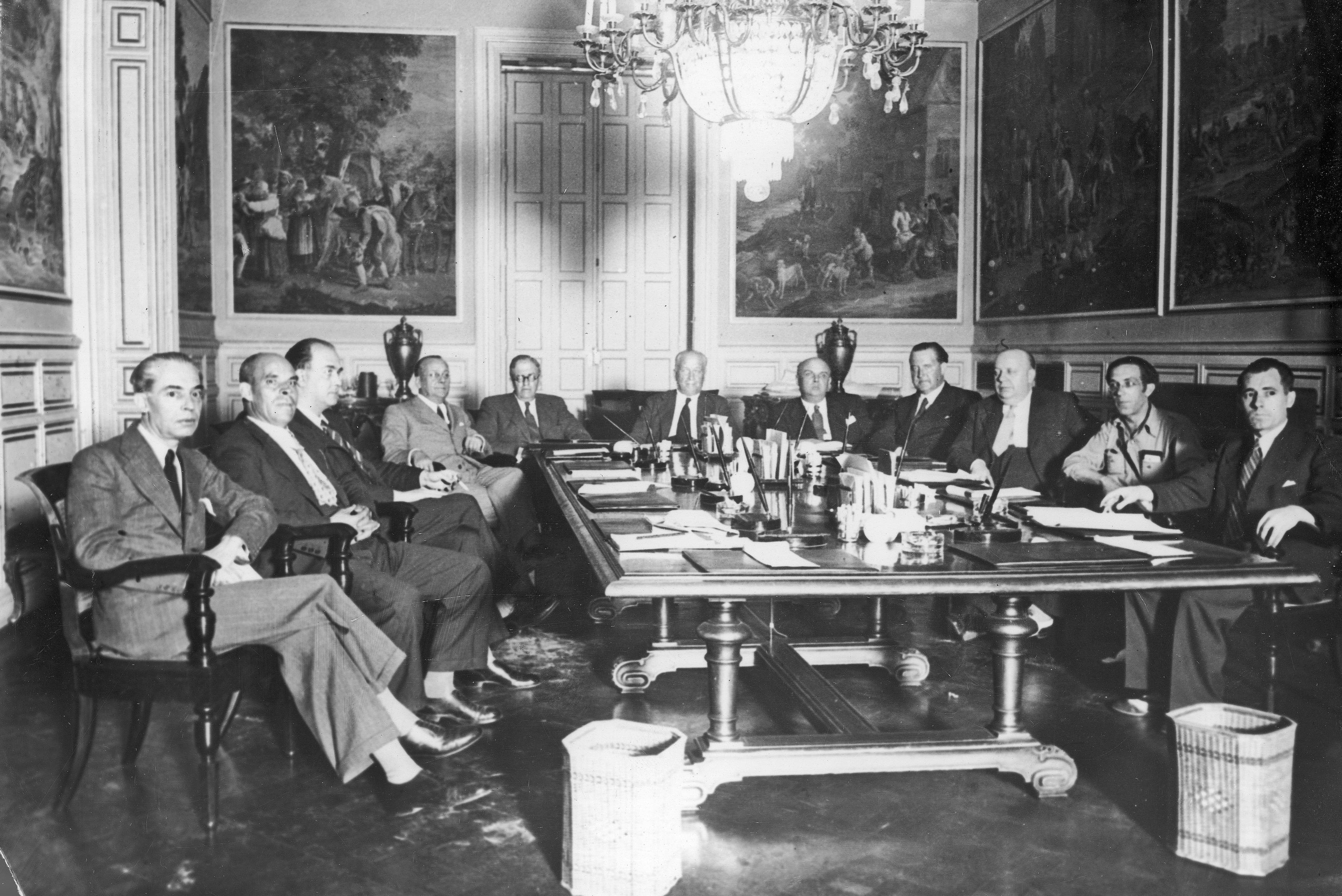
Francisco Largo Caballero chairing a meeting of the Council of Ministers during wartime

A growing rift between Prieto and Largo Caballero (with disparate views of politics, albeit sharing a general pragmatist approach) formed in 1935, while Besteiro's hold on the party diminished significantly. Followers of Indalecio Prieto would ultimately become "estranged from the party left". The PSOE formed part of the broad left-wing Popular Front electoral coalition that stood for election in the 1936 Spanish general election, and achieved a victory in seats over the right.

In September 1936, a few months into the Spanish Civil War (which lasted until 1939), a cabinet presided over by Largo Caballero was formed (he also held the functions of Minister of War). In November, Largo Caballero succeeded in bringing some National Confederation of Labor (CNT) members into his government. The left socialist caballeristas were revolutionary in rhetoric, although in reality they proposed moderate reformist policies while in government. The May Days of 1937 in Barcelona destabilised the government which was replaced by a new cabinet led by Juan Negrín, another socialist.

=== Clandestinity and exile (1939–1974) ===
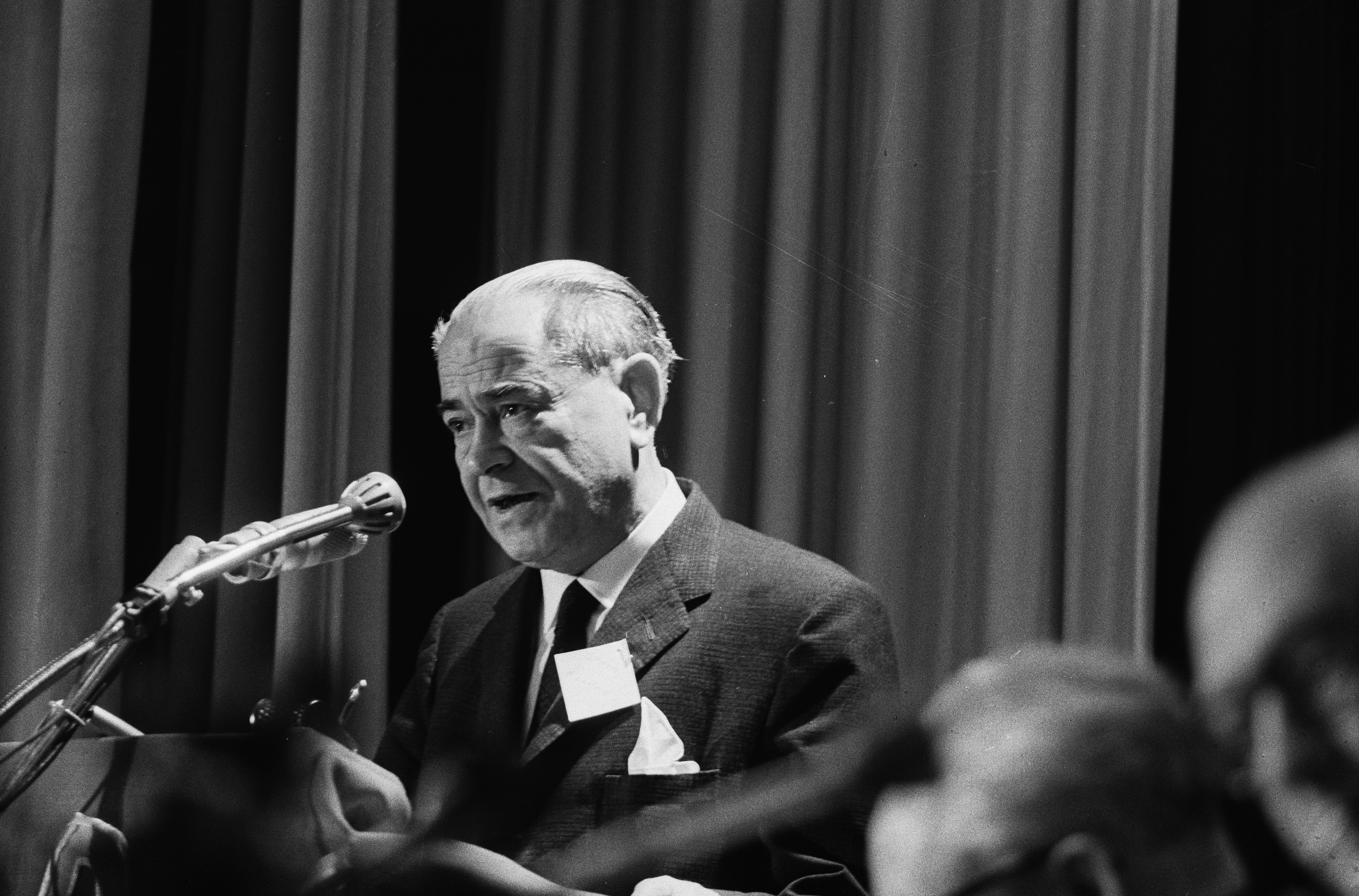
Rodolfo Llopis led the PSOE in exile for nearly three decades

With the PSOE reduced to clandestinity during the Francoist dictatorship, its members were persecuted, with many leaders, members and supporters being imprisoned or exiled and even executed. Prime Minister Negrín fled to France in March 1939 after the final collapse of the Republican front and his fall from office. The aging and ill Julián Besteiro, who preferred to stay in Spain over exile, died in a Francoist prison in 1940. Julián Zugazagoitia, government minister in 1937–1938, was captured with others in exile in Paris by the Gestapo, handed over to Spain, tried and found guilty of rebellion, and executed by firing squad in 1940. The party was legalised again only in 1977 during the Spanish transition to democracy.

Disputes between the followers of Indalecio Prieto (who had exiled to Mexico) and Juan Negrín over the political strategy of the Republican government in exile soon arose. Negrín, whose 1937–1939 spell at the government in wartime was seen negatively by large elements of both caballerista and prietista extraction, had become vilified. The party was re-organized along new lines in 1944 in the 1st Congress in Exile that took place in Toulouse and in which Rodolfo Llopis became the party's new secretary-general.

The PSOE congresses in exile during the post-war period were marked by strong anti-communist positions as a reflection of how the exiles remembered the last events of the Civil War (which featured bitter strifes with the communists) and in line with the stance of other parties of the Socialist International during the Cold War, neglecting any kind of rapprochement with the Communist Party of Spain (PCE). The relative void left in Spain by the PSOE, with a Toulouse-based direction lacking in dynamism and innovation, was filled by the PCE and other new clandestine organizations such as the Agrupación Socialista Universitaria (ASU), the Popular Liberation Front (FELIPE) or later the Enrique Tierno Galván's Socialist Party of the Interior. The Toulouse executive board became increasingly detached from the party in Spain in the 1960s an insurmountable chasm between the former and the party in the interior was already defined by 1972.

=== Return to democracy ===
==== González leadership (1974–1996) ====
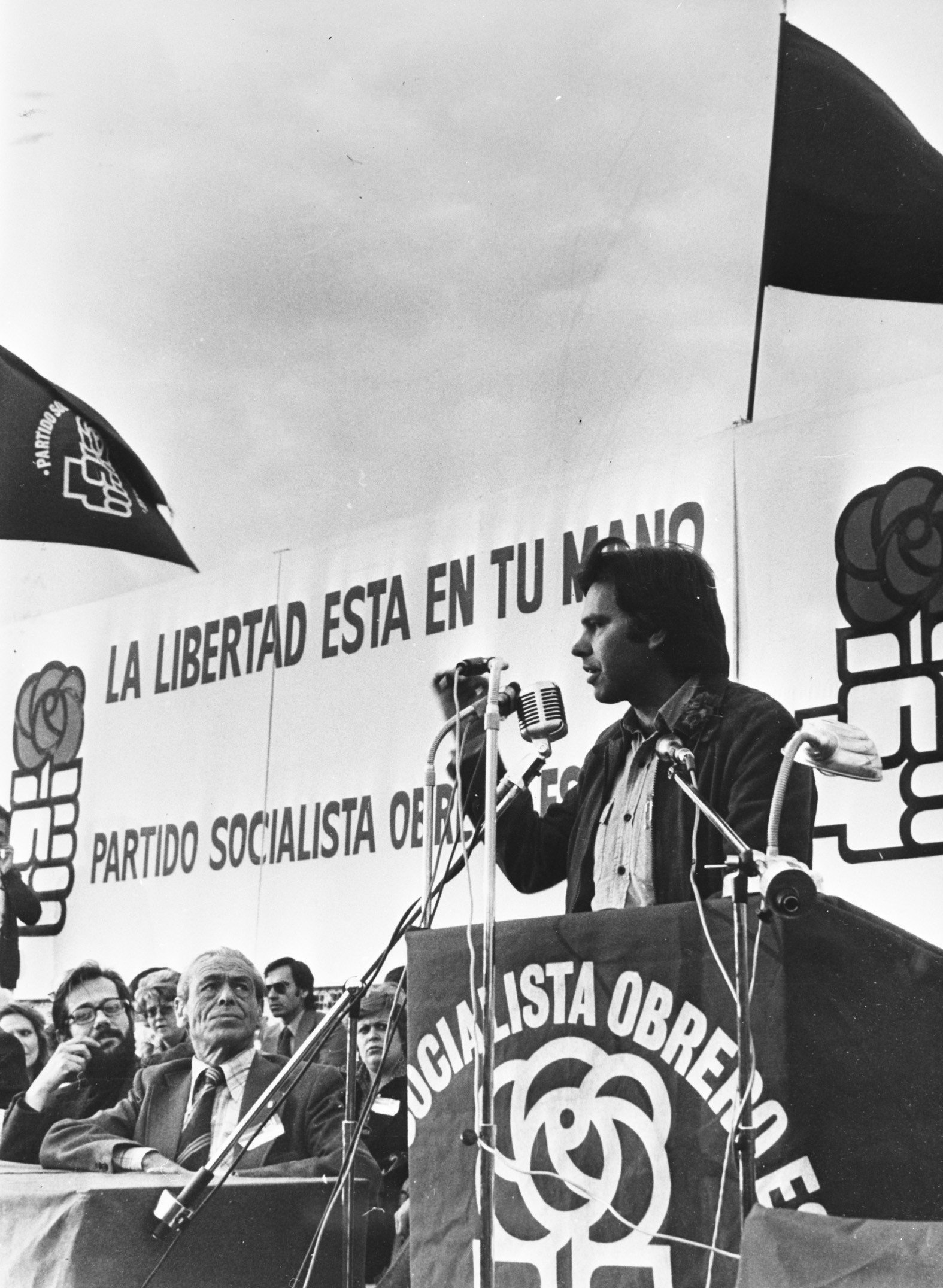
Felipe González during a speech in 1977

The 25th party congress was held in Toulouse in August 1972. In 1974, Felipe González was elected Secretary-General at the 26th party congress in Suresnes, replacing Llopis. González was from the reform wing of the party and his victory signaled a defeat for the historic and veteran wing of the party. The direction of the PSOE shifted from the exiles to the young people in Spain who had not fought the war. Llopis led a schism to form the Spanish Socialist Workers' Party (historic). González showed intentions to move the party away from its Marxist and socialist background, turning the PSOE into a social democratic party, similar to those of the rest of western Europe. In 1977, the PSOE became the unofficial opposition leading party with 29.2% of the vote and 118 seats in the Cortes Generales (which until then it had been the PCE, leading more aggressively among a larger representation of underground parties since the last free popular vote during the Civil War on Republican territory). Their standing was further boosted in 1978 when the Popular Socialist Party agreed to merge into the PSOE.

At the 27th party congress in May 1979, González resigned because the party would not abandon its Marxist character. In September of that year, the extraordinary 28th congress was called in which González was re-elected when the party agreed to move away from Marxism. Western European social democratic parties supported González's stand and the Social Democratic Party of Germany granted them money. PSOE party symbol was changed from the anvil with the book to the social democratic fist and rose created in the French Socialist Party, redrawn for the PSOE by José María Cruz Novillo. In the 1978 Spanish constitutional referendum, the PSOE supported the Spanish constitution which was approved. In the 1979 Spanish general election, the PSOE gained 30.5% of the vote and 121 seats, remaining the main opposition party. In the 1982 Spanish general election, the PSOE was victorious with 48.1% of the vote (10,127,392 total). González became Prime Minister of Spain on 2 December, a position he held until May 1996.

Although the party had opposed NATO, most party leaders supported keeping Spain inside the organisation after reaching the government. The González administration organised a referendum on the question in 1986, calling for a favourable vote, and won. The administration was criticised for avoiding the official names of North Atlantic Treaty Organisation and NATO, using the unofficial Atlantic Alliance terms. A symbol of this U-turn is Javier Solana who campaigned against NATO but ended up years later as its Secretary General. The PSOE supported the United States in the Gulf War (1991). PSOE won the 1986, 1989 and 1993 general elections. Under the Gonzalez administration, public expenditure on education, health, and pensions rose in total by 4.1 points of the country's GDP between 1982 and 1992.

Economic crisis and state terrorism (GAL) against the violent separatist group ETA eroded the popularity of González. In the 1996 Spanish general election, the PSOE lost to the conservative People's Party (PP) (PP). Between 1996 and 2001, the PSOE weathered a profound structural and leadership crisis, with Gonzalez resigning in 1997. The PSOE suffered a heavy defeat in the 2000 Spanish general election, with 34.7% of the popular vote. However, the PSOE remained as the ruling party in the autonomous communities of Andalusia, Asturias, Castilla-La Mancha and Extremadura.

==== Zapatero and Rubalcaba leadership (2000–2014) ====
In 2000, José Luis Rodríguez Zapatero was elected as the new Secretary-General, reforming the party with "Nueva Vía" (New Way). Later, the PSOE won the 2003 Spanish local elections. The PSOE strongly opposed the Iraq War which was supported by the Aznar government.

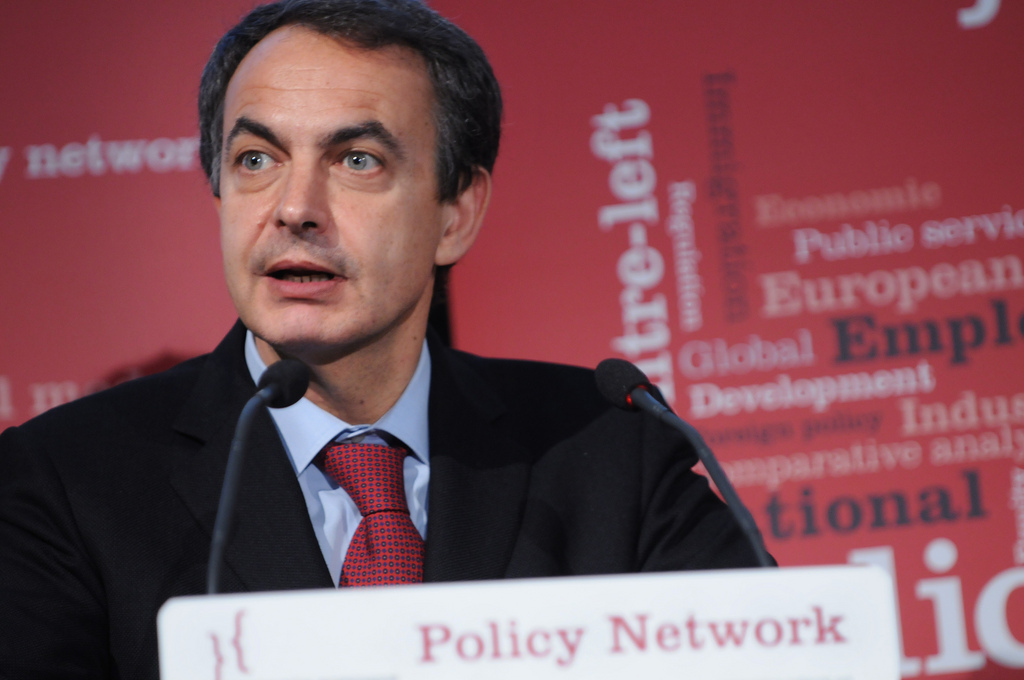
José Luis Rodríguez Zapatero during the 2010 Progressive Governance Conference

In the 2003 Catalan regional election, the PSOE's Socialists' Party of Catalonia (PSC) increased its vote total, but ended up in second place after Convergence and Union. After a period of negotiations, the party formed a pact with the Initiative for Catalonia Greens, the Republican Left of Catalonia and the United and Alternative Left, governing Catalonia until 2010.

In the 2004 Spanish general election, the PSOE won with almost 43% of the votes following the 11M terrorist (11 March) attacks. It was alleged by PP that the PSOE, with the help of the national newspaper El País, did not observe the "reflection journey" which forbade political parties from trying to sway public opinion (forbidden by Spanish law), calling the opposing political party "assassins" and blaming the terrorist attack on them. The PSOE maintained their lead in the 2004 European Parliament election.

In 2005, the PSOE called for a yes vote on the European Constitution. The PSOE also favoured the negotiations between the government and the ETA during the 2006 cease-fire which had a de facto end with the Madrid–Barajas Airport terrorist attack. In the 2008 Spanish general election, the PSOE won again, with Zapatero remaining prime minister. The PSOE increased their share of seats in the Congress of Deputies from 164 to 169 after the latest election.

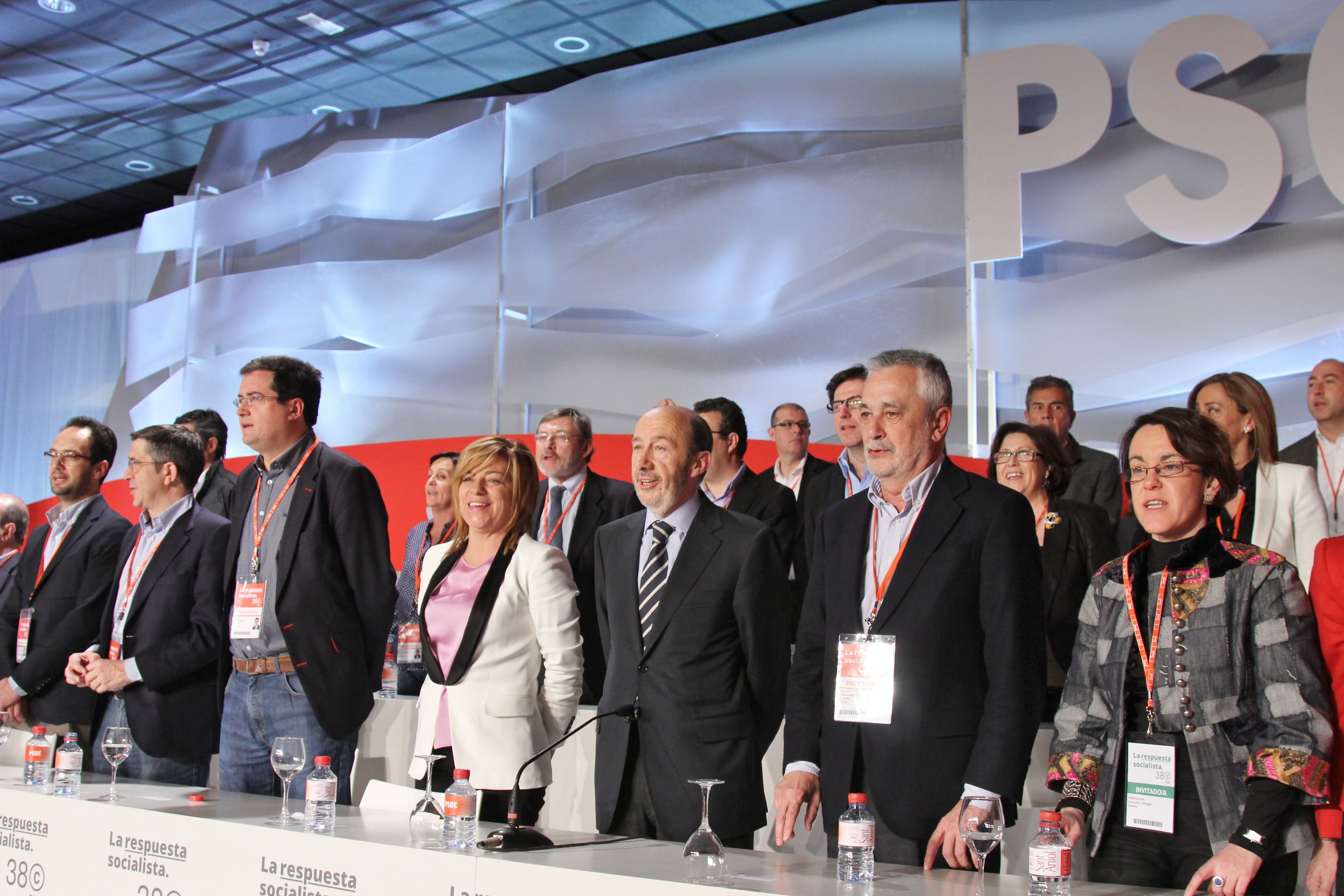
PSOE leading figures during the 38th Federal Congress of the PSOE in which Alfredo Pérez Rubalcaba (centre) was elected as Secretary-General

After waning popularity throughout their second term, the PSOE was defeated in the 2011 Spanish general election by the conservative People's Party. Shortly after, an extraordinary congress was held in which Alfredo Pérez Rubalcaba, former Deputy to Zapatero and Minister of the Interior, was elected Secretary-General defeating Carme Chacón, the other candidate, who stood for the Zapatero platform. This victory caused huge internal divisions and weakened the party's external image.

In 2013, the PSOE held a political conference which introduced a completely new platform, widely seen as a move to the left in an attempt to regain votes from parties such as the United Left, whose popularity rose steadily due to the general discontent with the two-party system and spending cuts. That platform was the basis for the 2014 European Parliament election manifesto, promoted as a solid alternative to the conservative plan for Europe. ThePSOE suffered another defeat, winning 14 seats. Shortly thereafter, Rubalcaba resigned as Secretary-General and an Extraordinary Congress was convoked.

==== Sánchez leadership (2014–present) ====
This party congress was the first to use a primary election system with three candidates, namely Pedro Sánchez, Eduardo Madina and José Antonio Pérez Tapias. Sánchez was elected with 49% of the vote of the affiliates and therefore became Secretary-General on 27 July 2014.

In the 2015 Spanish municipal elections, the PSOE won 25% of the vote, one of its worst results since the restoration of democracy. Together with the fall of the People's Party which won 27% of votes, it meant the end of the two-party system in Spain in favor of new parties. The PSOE alone lost 943 councilors. The 2015 Spanish general election produced a hung parliament broken into four major parties. The PSOE got about 20% of the vote, its worst result since democracy was restored. The parliament was so fragmented that no government could be formed and six months later new elections were held. The 2016 Spanish general election resulted in the PSOE losing a further five seats despite gaining 0.6% of the vote (still the party's second-worst popular vote total after 2015 since the restoration of democracy), leaving the party with 85 seats in the parliament, their lowest total since the restoration of democracy and the fewest since the 1933 in Republican Spain left the party with 59 seats in the 473-member parliament.

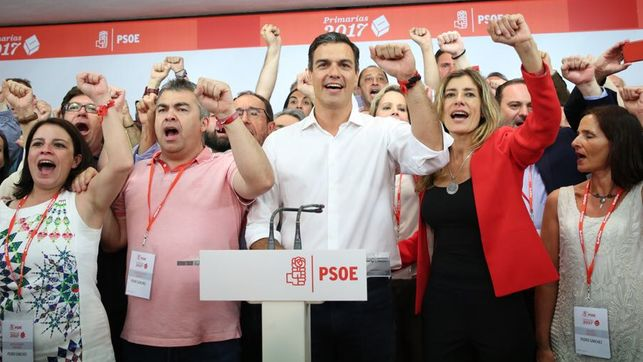
Pedro Sánchez (who led the party through its crisis in 2016) singing The Internationale after winning the 2017 primary election for Secretary-General

With the exception of the 2015 Andalusian regional election, elections held during the early leadership of Sánchez were losses for the PSOE. In addition, the policy of pacts conducted by Sánchez after the 2016 general election, based on Sánchez's outright refusal to facilitate a People's Party government, caused a faction within the party critical of Sánchez to gain momentum, led by President of Andalusia Susana Díaz. On 28 September 2016, the Secretary of Federal Policy Antonio Pradas went to the party's headquarters and presented the en bloc resignation of 17 members of the Federal Executive and the demands of those who resigned for the party to be run by an interim manager and to pressure Sánchez to resign as secretary-general. The Executive later lost two more members in the en bloc resignation, bringing the total number of resignations to 19. Resigning executives included the president of the party Micaela Navarro, the former Minister Carme Chacón, the President of Valencia Ximo Puig and the President of Castilla–La Mancha Emiliano García-Page. This launched the 2016 PSOE crisis. On the afternoon of 1 October 2016, after holding a tense Federal Committee meeting, Sánchez resigned as party General-Secretary, forcing an extraordinary party congress to choose a new General-Secretary. That night, it was reported that an interim manager would be chosen, later confirmed to be the President of Asturias Javier Fernández Fernández. Sánchez announced his intention to run for General-Secretary of the party as did Susana Díaz (one of the leaders of the anti-Sánchez faction of the party) and Patxi López, former President of the Basque Autonomous Community. At the 39th federal congress in June 2017, Díaz received 48.3% of endorsements, outpacing both Sánchez (43.0% of endorsements) and López (8.7% of endorsements), but Sánchez won an absolute majority of the party's popular vote at 50.3% (Díaz received 39.9% and López 9.8%). Both Díaz and López withdrew before the delegate vote, returning Sánchez as the General-Secretary and ending the crisis.

In mid-2018, the National Court found that the conservative People's Party profited from the illegal kickbacks-for-contracts scheme of the Gürtel affair, confirming the existence of an illegal accounting and financing structure that ran in parallel with the party's official one since 1989 and that sentenced that the PP helped to establish "a genuine and effective system of institutional corruption through the manipulation of central, autonomous and local public procurement". The PSOE Parliamentary Group in the Congress of Deputies filed a motion of no confidence against the government of Prime Minister Mariano Rajoy, presenting Sánchez as alternative candidate. The PSOE's motion passed with the support of Unidos Podemos (UP), Republican Left of Catalonia (ERC), Catalan European Democratic Party (PDeCAT), Basque Nationalist Party (PNV), Coalició Compromís, EH Bildu and New Canaries (NCa), bringing down the Rajoy government. The PP voted against the proposal, joined by Citizens (C's), the Navarrese People's Union (UPN) and the Asturias Forum (FAC). The Canarian Coalition (CC) abstained. Following the successful motion of no confidence, Sánchez became prime minister on 2 June 2018 in a minority government. In December 2018, the PSOE's branch in Andalusia was defeated in the 2018 Andalusian regional election for the first time since the restoration of democracy, with a centre-right coalition of PP, C's and the resurgent right-wing nationalists Vox taking power in the region.

For most of his first term as prime minister, Sánchez relied on support from the UP and the NC to get his agenda passed, occasionally being forced into negotiating with the Catalan separatist parties the ERC and the PDeCAT and the PNV on individual issues. In February 2019, the ERC, the PDeCAT and En Marea withdrew their support of Sánchez's government by voting against and helping defeat the 2019 General State Budget and Sánchez called an early election for 28 April 2019. The April 2019 Spanish general election resulted in victory for the PSOE, with the party winning 123 seats on 28.7% of the vote in the Cortes and an absolute majority of 139 in the Senate, gains of 38 and 79 seats respectively. The PSOE also finished eight percentage points ahead of the PP which finished second in both seats and in the popular vote. At election night, party supporters demanded Sánchez to reject any coalition with Cs. On the same day as the April 2019 general election, the 2019 Valencian regional election resulted in the Valencian branch of the PSOE being re-elected in coalition with the Valencianist party Compromís and UP.

On 26 May 2019, the PSOE became the largest Spanish party in the European Parliament following the 2019 European Parliament election. The PSOE gained six seats to bring their total to 20 and won all but eight provinces in the country. 26 May also saw regional elections for every region in the country except Valencia, Catalonia, Andalusia, the Basque Country and Galicia. In every region, the PSOE gained seats and votes from the 2015 regional elections. The PSOE finished first in terms of votes and seats in every region except for Cantabria, where the Regionalist Party of Cantabria (PRC) finished first and the PSOE third behind the PP; and Navarra, where the conservative regionalist NA+ finished first and the Socialist Party of Navarre finished second. PSOE governments were re-elected in Castilla-La Mancha and Extremadura, with the party receiving an absolute majority of seats in both regions. The party took over the Presidency of the Canary Islands with the support of New Canaries and Podemos, ending 26 years of Canarian Coalition government. On the same date, the PSOE became the largest party in the municipalities following the local elections.

Following months of political deadlock, Sánchez called a second general election in seven months. In the November 2019 Spanish general election, the PSOE lost three members of parliament and 0.7% of the popular vote in the election, while the PP and VOX gained 23 and 28 seats respectively, further worsening the deadlock. As of 23 December, there was still no government in place, although members of PSOE, PSC and UP had voted to join in a coalition government, agreed to by Sánchez and UP Secretary-General Pablo Iglesias Turrión. On 5 January 2020, the PSOE–UP government failed its first investiture vote, with 166 votes in favor and 165 opposed with 18 abstentions and one UP parliamentarian absent, therefore the government fell short of an absolute majority. On 7 January, the investiture motion, this time requiring only a simple majority, passed with 167 votes in favour and 165 against. PSOE, UP, En Comú Podem, Grupo Común da Esquerda, PNV, Más País, Compromís, NCa, the Galician Nationalist Bloc (BNG) and Teruel Existe (TE) voted in favor of the government, with PP, Vox, Cs, Together for Catalonia (JxCat), the Popular Unity Candidacy (CUP), NA+, CC, PRC and FAC voting against while ERC and EH Bildu both abstained.

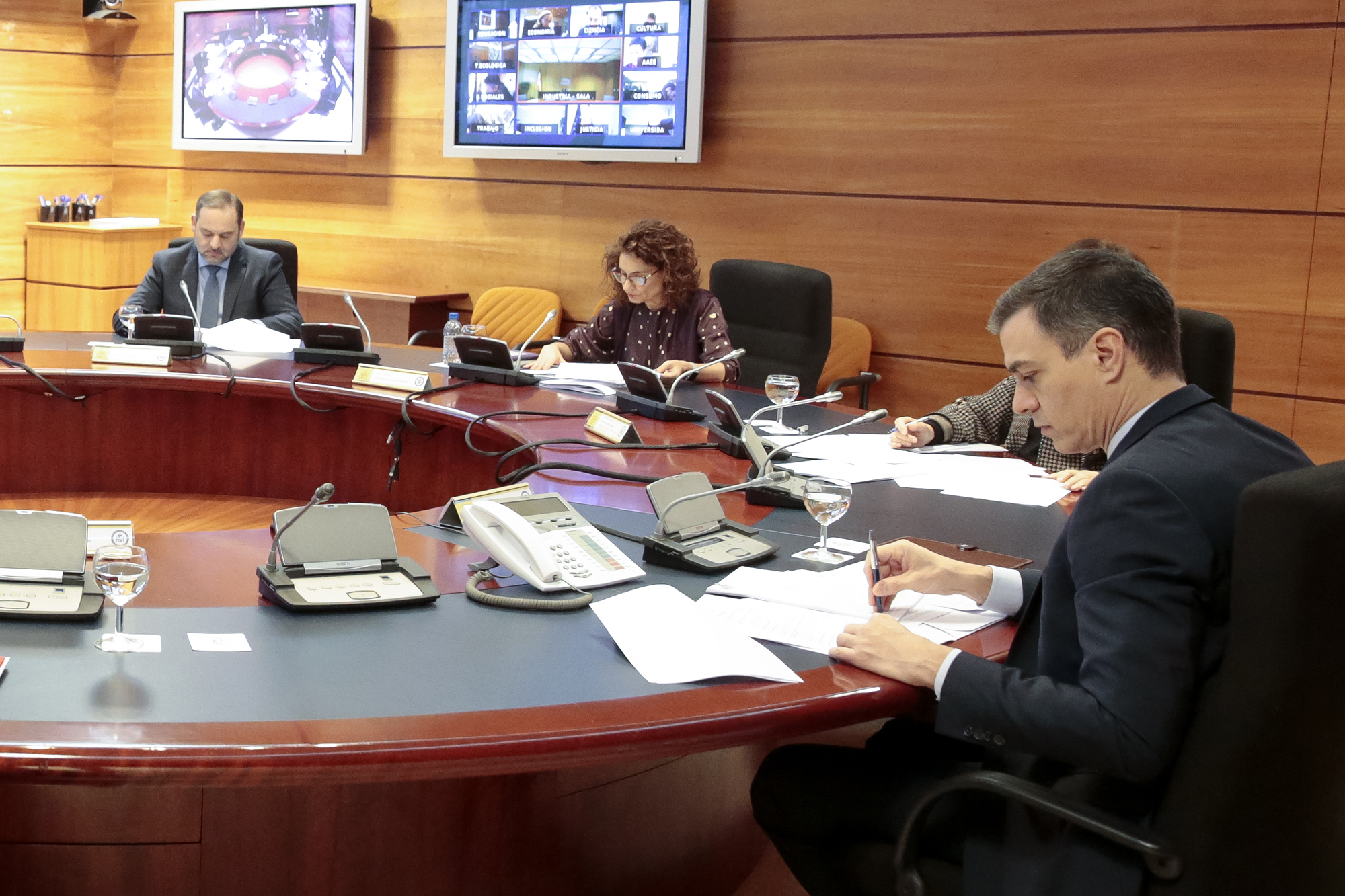
José Luis Ábalos, María Jesús Montero and Pedro Sánchez in March 2020

In 2021, PSOE started a podcast called Donde hay partido.

Throughout 2025, the party was rocked by allegations of sexual harassment by some members—with political backlash expanding to the party's handling of the cases, seeing internal outcry being compared to the MeToo movement—that prompted the resignation or dismissal of a number of officials at the local and regional level, as well as in the prime minister's office.

As of 2026, two former party's organization secretaries, José Luis Ábalos and Santos Cerdán, are currently the subject of a corruption probe on the Koldo case.

== Ideology ==
=== From Marxism to social democracy ===
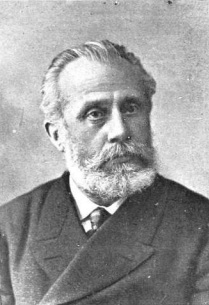
Pablo Iglesias founded the party in 1879

The PSOE was founded with the purpose of representing and defending the interests of the proletariat formed during the Industrial Revolution in the 19th century. In its beginnings, the PSOE's main objective was the defense of workers' rights and the achievement of the ideals of socialism, emerging from contemporary philosophy and Marxist politics, by securing political power for the working class and establishing a dictatorship of the proletariat in order to achieve social ownership of the means of production. The ideology of the PSOE has evolved throughout the 20th century according to relevant historical events and the evolution of Spanish society.

In 1979, the party abandoned its definitive Marxist thesis at the hands of its Secretary-General Felipe González, not before overcoming great tensions and two party congresses, the first of which preferred to maintain Marxism. Before this situation, notable internal leaders such as Pablo Castellano and Luis Gómez Llorente founded the internal faction of Left Socialists which included the militants who would not renounce Marxism. This allowed for the consolidation of the leftist forces in the PSOE. From this moment, the diverse events both outside and within the party led to projects that resembled those of other European social democratic parties and acceptance of the defence of the market economy. The democratic socialist faction has been especially critical of the party's Third Way move to the centre starting in the 1980s for its economic liberal nature, denouncing the policies of deregulation, cuts in social benefits, and privatisations.

The PSOE defines itself as social democratic, left-wing, and progressive. It is grouped with other self-styled socialists, social democrats, and labour parties in the Party of European Socialists, and supports pro-Europeanism. During his shift to the left in 2017, party leader Pedro Sánchez stood for a refoundation of social democracy, in order to transition to a post-capitalist society and end neoliberal capitalism, as well as for the indissoluble link between social democracy and Europe.

=== Federalism ===
During the Second Spanish Republic, the structure of the state was still open with in the party, with two differing views, namely a centralist view as well as a federal one competing against one another. The later years of the Francoist dictatorship saw a period in which the PSOE defended the right to "self-determination of the peoples of Spain", as a reflection of a newer ideological and a pragmatist approach of the party. Ultimately, the party, while sticking to its preference for a federal system, gradually ceased to mention the notion of self-determination during the Spanish transition to democracy. Ideas in support of to the independence of the autonomous territories of Catalonia, the Basque Country and Galicia, have been adopted by some elements of the party, while the others in the PSOE are heavily critical of said notions, because, as they see it, the principle of territorial equality among the autonomous communities would be under threat if the autonomous territories became independent.

== Electoral performance ==
=== Cortes Generales ===
Cortes Generales
Election	Leading candidate	Congress			Senate			Gov.
Election	Leading candidate	Votes	%	Seats	Votes	%	Seats	Gov.
1907	Pablo Iglesias Posse			0 / 404			0 / 180	—
1910	Pablo Iglesias Posse	Within CRS		1 / 404	Within CRS		0 / 180	No
1914	Pablo Iglesias Posse	Within CRS		1 / 408	Within CRS		0 / 180	No
1916	Pablo Iglesias Posse	Within CRS		1 / 409	Within CRS		0 / 180	No
1918	Pablo Iglesias Posse	Within AI		6 / 409	Within AI		0 / 180	No
1919	Pablo Iglesias Posse	Within CRS		6 / 409	Within CRS		0 / 180	No
1920	Pablo Iglesias Posse			4 / 409			0 / 180	No
1923	Pablo Iglesias Posse			7 / 409			0 / 180	No
Primo de Rivera dictatorship
1931	Julián Besteiro	Within CRS		116 / 470	Did not exist			Yes (Note: 1931–1933.)
1931	Julián Besteiro	Within CRS		116 / 470	Did not exist			No (Note: 1933.)
1933	Francisco Largo Caballero	1,858,300	21.7 (#3)	59 / 473	Did not exist			No
1936	Indalecio Prieto	Within FP		99 / 473	Did not exist			No (Note: 1936.)
1936	Indalecio Prieto	Within FP		99 / 473	Did not exist			Yes (Note: 1936–1939.)
Francoist dictatorship
1977	Felipe González	5,371,866	29.3 (#2)	118 / 350	5,714,036	11.0 (#2)	35 / 207	No
1979	Felipe González	5,469,813	30.4 (#2)	121 / 350	12,762,128	25.4 (#2)	60 / 208	No
1982	Felipe González	10,127,392	48.1 (#**1**)	202 / 350	27,954,856	47.6 (#**1**)	134 / 208	Yes
1986	Felipe González	8,901,718	44.1 (#**1**)	184 / 350	24,719,863	44.5 (#**1**)	124 / 208	Yes
1989	Felipe González	8,115,568	39.6 (#**1**)	175 / 350	22,272,484	40.1 (#**1**)	107 / 208	Yes
1993	Felipe González	9,150,083	38.8 (#**1**)	159 / 350	25,441,605	39.0 (#**1**)	96 / 208	Yes
1996	Felipe González	9,425,678	37.6 (#2)	141 / 350	25,865,206	37.7 (#2)	81 / 208	No
2000	Joaquín Almunia	7,918,752	34.2 (#2)	125 / 350	16,323,744	26.3 (#2)	53 / 208	No
2004	José Luis Rodríguez Zapatero	11,026,163	42.6 (#**1**)	164 / 350	25,666,070	36.5 (#2)	81 / 208	Yes
2008	José Luis Rodríguez Zapatero	11,289,335	43.9 (#**1**)	169 / 350	25,965,221	37.2 (#2)	86 / 208	Yes
2011	Alfredo Pérez Rubalcaba	7,003,511	28.8 (#2)	110 / 350	16,469,470	26.0 (#2)	48 / 208	No
2015	Pedro Sánchez	5,545,315	22.0 (#2)	90 / 350	14,887,751	22.4 (#2)	47 / 208	—
2016	Pedro Sánchez	5,443,846	22.6 (#2)	85 / 350	15,354,929	23.6 (#2)	43 / 208	No (Note: 2016–2018.)
2016	Pedro Sánchez	5,443,846	22.6 (#2)	85 / 350	15,354,929	23.6 (#2)	43 / 208	Yes (Note: 2018–2019.)
Apr. 2019	Pedro Sánchez	7,513,142	28.7 (#**1**)	123 / 350	21,058,377	29.3 (#**1**)	123 / 208	—
Nov. 2019	Pedro Sánchez	6,792,199	28.0 (#**1**)	120 / 350	19,481,846	30.6 (#**1**)	93 / 208	Yes
2023	Pedro Sánchez	7,821,718	31.7 (#2)	121 / 350	21,970,469	32.2 (#2)	72 / 208	Yes

=== European Parliament ===
European Parliament
Election	Leading candidate	Votes	%	Seats	EP Group
1987	Fernando Morán	7,522,706	39.1 (#**1**)	28 / 60	SOC
1989	Fernando Morán	6,275,552	39.6 (#**1**)	27 / 60	SOC
1994	Fernando Morán	5,719,707	30.8 (#2)	22 / 64	PES
1999	Rosa Díez	7,477,823	35.3 (#2)	24 / 64	PES
2004	Josep Borrell	6,741,112	43.5 (#**1**)	25 / 54	PES
2009	Juan Fernando López Aguilar	6,141,784	38.8 (#2)	23 / 54	S&D
2014	Elena Valenciano	3,614,232	23.0 (#2)	14 / 54	S&D
2019	Josep Borrell	7,369,789	32.9 (#**1**)	21 / 59	S&D
2024	Teresa Ribera	5,290,945	30.2 (#2)	20 / 61	S&D

=== Results timeline ===
Year	(Spain) ES	(European Union) EU	(Andalusia) AN	(Aragon) AR	(Asturias) AS	(Canary Islands) CN	(Cantabria) CB	(Castilla–La Mancha) CM	(Castile and León) CL	(Catalonia) CT	(Ceuta) CE	(Extremadura) EX	(Galicia (Spain)) GL	(Balearic Islands) IB	RI	(Community of Madrid) MD	(Melilla) ML	(Region of Murcia) MC	(Navarre) NC	(Basque Country (autonomous community)) PV	(Valencian Community) CV
1977	29.3	N/A	N/A	N/A	N/A	N/A	N/A	N/A	N/A	N/A	N/A	N/A	N/A	N/A	N/A	N/A	N/A	N/A	N/A	N/A	N/A
1978	29.3	N/A	N/A	N/A	N/A	N/A	N/A	N/A	N/A	N/A	N/A	N/A	N/A	N/A	N/A	N/A	N/A	N/A	N/A	N/A	N/A
1979	▲30.4	N/A	N/A	N/A	N/A	N/A	N/A	N/A	N/A	N/A	N/A	N/A	N/A	N/A	N/A	N/A	N/A	N/A	18.9	N/A	N/A
1980	▲30.4	N/A	N/A	N/A	N/A	N/A	N/A	N/A	N/A	22.4	N/A	N/A	N/A	N/A	N/A	N/A	N/A	N/A		14.2	N/A
1981	▲30.4	N/A	N/A	N/A	N/A	N/A	N/A	N/A	N/A	22.4	N/A	N/A	19.6	N/A	N/A	N/A	N/A	N/A		14.2	N/A
1982	▲**48.1**	N/A	**52.6**	N/A	N/A	N/A	N/A	N/A	N/A	22.4	N/A	N/A	19.6	N/A	N/A	N/A	N/A	N/A		14.2	N/A
1983		N/A		**46.8**	**52.0**	**41.5**	**38.4**	46.7	**44.4**	22.4	N/A	53.0	19.6	**34.7**	**47.2**	**50.5**	N/A	**52.2**	▲**35.6**	14.2	**51.4**
1984		N/A					**38.4**			▲30.1	N/A		19.6	**34.7**			N/A			▲23.0	
1985		N/A					**38.4**			▲30.1	N/A		▲28.7	**34.7**			N/A			▲23.0	
1986	▼44.1	N/A	▼47.0				**38.4**			▲30.1	N/A		▲28.7	**34.7**			N/A			▼22.0	
1987		39.1		▼35.7	▼38.9	▼27.8	▼29.6	▼46.3	▼34.0	▲30.1	N/A	▼49.2		▼32.5	▼39.6	▼38.4	N/A	▼43.7	▼27.7		▼41.3
1988		39.1		▼35.7		▼27.8	▼29.6		▼34.0	▼29.8	N/A			▼32.5	▼39.6		N/A				
1989	▼39.6	▲39.6		▼35.7		▼27.8	▼29.6		▼34.0	▼29.8	N/A		▲32.7	▼32.5	▼39.6		N/A				
1990		▲39.6	▲49.6	▼35.7		▼27.8			▼34.0	▼29.8	N/A		▲32.7	▼32.5			N/A			▼19.8	
1991		▲39.6		▲40.3	▲41.0	▲33.0	▲34.8	▲52.2	▲36.4	▼29.8	N/A	▲**54.2**	▲32.7	▼30.1	▲42.4	▼36.6	N/A	▲45.3	▲33.4	▼19.8	▲42.8
1992		▲39.6		▲40.3			▲34.8		▲36.4	▼27.5	N/A		▲32.7	▼30.1			N/A		▲33.4		
1993	▼38.8	▲39.6					▲34.8		▲36.4	▼27.5	N/A		▼23.7	▼30.1			N/A		▲33.4		
1994		▼30.8	▼38.7				▲34.8		▲36.4	▼27.5	N/A		▼23.7	▼30.1			N/A		▲33.4	▼16.8	
1995		▼30.8		▼25.7	▼33.8	▼23.1	▼25.1	▼45.7	▼29.7	▼24.9	13.1	▼43.9	▼23.7	▼24.0	▼34.1	▼29.7	**19.9**	▼31.9	▼20.9		▼34.0
1996	▼37.6	▼30.8	▲44.1	▼25.7	▼33.8	▼23.1	▼25.1		▼29.7	▼24.9			▼23.7	▼24.0	▼34.1	▼29.7	**19.9**	▼31.9			▼34.0
1997	▼37.6	▼30.8		▼25.7	▼33.8	▼23.1	▼25.1		▼29.7	▼24.9			▼19.5	▼24.0	▼34.1	▼29.7	**19.9**	▼31.9			▼34.0
1998	▼37.6	▼30.8		▼25.7	▼33.8	▼23.1	▼25.1		▼29.7	▼24.9			▼19.5	▼24.0	▼34.1	▼29.7	**19.9**	▼31.9		▲17.4	▼34.0
1999	▼37.6	▲35.3		▲30.8	▲46.0	▲24.0	▲33.1	▲53.4	▲33.1	▲**37.9**	▼7.4	▲48.5	▼19.5	▼22.0	▲35.3	▲36.4	▼9.4	▲35.9	▼20.3	▲17.4	▲33.9
2000	▼34.2	▲35.3	▲44.3			▲24.0	▲33.1		▲33.1	▲**37.9**	▼7.4		▼19.5		▲35.3	▲36.4	▼9.4	▲35.9	▼20.3	▲17.4	▲33.9
2001	▼34.2	▲35.3				▲24.0	▲33.1		▲33.1	▲**37.9**	▼7.4		▲21.8		▲35.3	▲36.4	▼9.4	▲35.9	▼20.3	▲17.8	▲33.9
2002	▼34.2	▲35.3				▲24.0	▲33.1		▲33.1	▲**37.9**	▼7.4		▲21.8		▲35.3	▲36.4	▼9.4	▲35.9	▼20.3	▲17.8	▲33.9
2003	▼34.2	▲35.3		▲37.9	▼40.5	▲25.4	▼30.0	▲**57.8**	▲36.8	▼31.2	▲8.7	▲51.7	▲21.8	▲24.5	▲38.2	▲40.0	▲12.0	▼34.1	▲21.2	▲17.8	▲36.0
2003	▼34.2	▲35.3				▲25.4			▲36.8		▲8.7		▲21.8	▲24.5	▲38.2	▼39.0	▲12.0	▼34.1	▲21.2	▲17.8	▲36.0
2004	▲42.6	▲**43.5**	▲50.4			▲25.4			▲36.8		▲8.7		▲21.8	▲24.5	▲38.2	▼39.0	▲12.0	▼34.1	▲21.2	▲17.8	▲36.0
2005		▲**43.5**				▲25.4			▲36.8		▲8.7		▲**33.2**	▲24.5	▲38.2	▼39.0	▲12.0	▼34.1	▲21.2	▲22.5	▲36.0
2006		▲**43.5**				▲25.4			▲36.8	▼26.8	▲8.7			▲24.5	▲38.2	▼39.0	▲12.0	▼34.1	▲21.2	▲22.5	▲36.0
2007		▲**43.5**		▲41.1	▲42.0	▲34.5	▼24.5	▼52.0	▲37.7		▼8.7	▲53.0		▲27.6	▲40.4	▼33.6	▲18.2	▼32.0	▲22.5	▲22.5	▼34.5
2008	▲43.9	▲**43.5**	▼48.4			▲34.5			▲37.7		▼8.7				▲40.4	▼33.6	▲18.2	▼32.0	▲22.5	▲22.5	▼34.5
2009		▼38.8				▲34.5			▲37.7		▼8.7		▼31.0		▲40.4	▼33.6	▲18.2	▼32.0	▲22.5	▲**30.4**	▼34.5
2010		▼38.8				▲34.5			▲37.7	▼18.4	▼8.7		▼31.0		▲40.4	▼33.6	▲18.2	▼32.0	▲22.5		▼34.5
2011	▼28.8	▼38.8		▼29.0	▼29.9	▼21.0	▼16.4	▼43.4	▼29.7	▼18.4	▲11.7	▼43.4	▼31.0	▼21.4	▼30.3	▼26.3	▼8.6	▼23.9	▼15.9		▼28.0
2012	▼28.8	▼38.8	▼39.6	▼29.0	▲32.1		▼16.4	▼43.4	▼29.7	▼14.4	▲11.7	▼43.4	▼20.6	▼21.4	▼30.3	▼26.3	▼8.6	▼23.9		▼18.9	▼28.0
2013	▼28.8	▼38.8		▼29.0			▼16.4	▼43.4	▼29.7	▼14.4	▲11.7	▼43.4	▼20.6	▼21.4	▼30.3	▼26.3	▼8.6	▼23.9		▼18.9	▼28.0
2014	▼28.8	▼23.0		▼29.0			▼16.4	▼43.4	▼29.7	▼14.4	▲11.7	▼43.4	▼20.6	▼21.4	▼30.3	▼26.3	▼8.6	▼23.9		▼18.9	▼28.0
2015	▼22.0	▼23.0	▼35.4	▼21.4	▼26.5	▼19.9	▼14.0	▼36.1	▼25.9	▼12.7	▲14.0	▼41.5	▼20.6	▼18.9	▼26.7	▼25.4	▲12.6	▲23.9	▼13.4	▼18.9	▼20.6
2016	▲22.6	▼23.0							▼25.9	▼12.7	▲14.0		▼17.9		▼26.7	▼25.4	▲12.6	▲23.9	▼13.4	▼11.9	
2017	▲22.6	▼23.0							▼25.9	▲13.9	▲14.0		▼17.9		▼26.7	▼25.4	▲12.6	▲23.9	▼13.4		
2018		▼23.0	▼27.9						▼25.9	▲13.9	▲14.0		▼17.9		▼26.7	▼25.4	▲12.6	▲23.9	▼13.4		
2019	▲28.7	▲32.9	▼27.9	▲30.8	▲35.3	▲28.9	▲17.6	▲44.1	▲34.8	▲13.9	▲**25.6**	▲46.8	▼17.9	▲27.4	▲38.7	▲27.3	▲14.4	▲32.5	▲20.6		▲24.2
2019	▼28.0	▲32.9	▼27.9						▲34.8	▲13.9	▲**25.6**		▼17.9			▲27.3		▲32.5			
2020		▲32.9	▼27.9						▲34.8	▲13.9	▲**25.6**		▲19.4			▲27.3		▲32.5		▲13.5	
2021		▲32.9	▼27.9						▲34.8	▲23.0	▲**25.6**		▲19.4			▼16.8		▲32.5			
2022		▲32.9	▼24.1						▼30.1	▲23.0	▲**25.6**		▲19.4			▼16.8		▲32.5			
2023	▲31.7	▲32.9	▼24.1	▼29.6	▲36.5	▼27.2	▲20.6	▲45.1	▼30.1	▲23.0	▼21.0	▼39.9	▲19.4	▼26.5	▼31.9	▲18.2	▼10.7	▼25.6	▲20.7		▲28.7
2024		▼30.2	▼24.1	▼29.6		▼27.2	▲20.6		▼30.1	▲28.0	▼21.0	▼39.9	▼14.0	▼26.5	▼31.9	▲18.2	▼10.7	▼25.6		▲14.1	▲28.7
2025		▼30.2	▼24.1	▼29.6		▼27.2	▲20.6		▼30.1		▼21.0	▼25.7	▼14.0	▼26.5	▼31.9	▲18.2	▼10.7	▼25.6			▲28.7
2026		▼30.2	▼22.7	▼24.4		▼27.2	▲20.6		▲30.8		▼21.0	▼25.7	▼14.0	▼26.5	▼31.9	▲18.2	▼10.7	▼25.6			▲28.7
Year	(Spain) ES	(European Union) EU	(Andalusia) AN	(Aragon) AR	(Asturias) AS	(Canary Islands) CN	(Cantabria) CB	(Castilla–La Mancha) CM	(Castile and León) CL	(Catalonia) CT	(Ceuta) CE	(Extremadura) EX	(Galicia (Spain)) GL	(Balearic Islands) IB	RI	(Community of Madrid) MD	(Melilla) ML	(Region of Murcia) MC	(Navarre) NC	(Basque Country (autonomous community)) PV	(Valencian Community) CV
**Bold** indicates best result to date. To be decided Present in legislature (in opposition); Junior coalition partner Senior coalition partner

== Organization ==
=== Former logos ===
1976–1977 (provisional)

1977–2001 (co-existed with the 1994 logo until 2001)

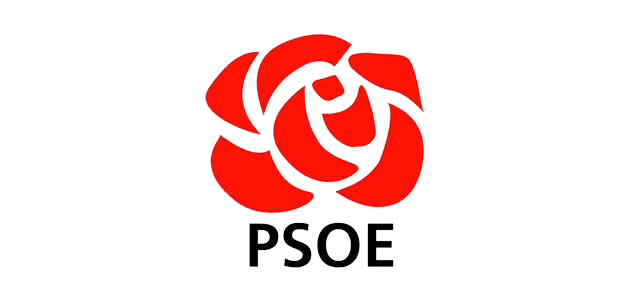
1994–2001

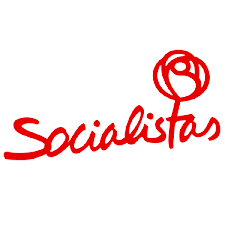
2013–2015 (variation)

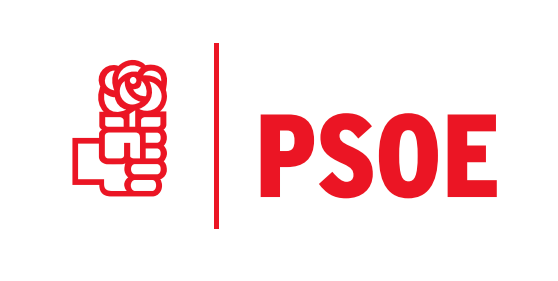
2017 (variation)

2019 (variation)

=== Leadership ===
The Secretary General has been the head of the party as well as its parliamentary chair since 1974. The party was previously led by its President.

President	Term
Pablo Iglesias	1879–1925
Julián Besteiro	1925–1931
Remigio Cabello	1931–1932
Francisco Largo Caballero	1932–1935
Indalecio Prieto	1935–1948
Trifón Gómez	1948–1955
Vacant	1955–1964
Pascual Tomás	1964–1967
Ramón Rubial	1967–1970
In exile	1970–1976
Ramón Rubial	1976–1999
Manuel Chaves	1999–2012
José Antonio Griñán	2012–2014
Micaela Navarro	2014–2016
Cristina Narbona	2017–present

Secretary-General	Term
Ramón Lamoneda	1936–1944
Rodolfo Llopis	1944–1972
In exile	1972–1974
Felipe González	1974–1997
Joaquín Almunia	1997–2000
José Luis Rodríguez Zapatero	2000–2012
Alfredo Pérez Rubalcaba	2012–2014
Pedro Sánchez	2014–2016; 2017–present

Deputy Secretary-General	Term
Alfonso Guerra	1979–1997
Vacant	1997–2008
Pepe Blanco	2008–2012
Elena Valenciano	2012–2014
Vacant	2014–2017
Adriana Lastra	2017–2022
María Jesús Montero	2022–present

Prime Ministers of Spain	Term
Francisco Largo Caballero	1936–1937
Juan Negrín López	1937–1939
Felipe González	1982–1996
José Luis Rodríguez Zapatero	2004–2011
Pedro Sánchez	2018–present

==== Regional secretaries-general ====
- Andalusia: María Jesús Montero (since 2025)
- Aragon: Pilar Alegría (since 2025)
- Asturias: Adrián Barbón (since 2017)
- Balearic Islands: Francina Armengol (since 2012)
- Basque Country: Eneko Andueza (since 2021)
- Canary Islands: Ángel Víctor Torres (since 2017)
- Cantabria: Pedro Casares (since 2025)
- Castile and León: Carlos Martínez Mínguez (since 2025)
- Castilla-La Mancha: Emiliano García-Page (since 2012)
- Catalonia: Salvador Illa (since 2021)
- Ceuta: Vacant (since 2026)
- Community of Madrid: Óscar López (since 2024)
- Extremadura: Álvaro Sánchez Cotrina (since 2026)
- Galicia: José Ramón Gómez Besteiro (since 2024)
- La Rioja: Javier García Ibáñez (since 2025)
- Melilla: Sabrina Moh Abdelkader (since 2024)
- Murcia: Francisco Lucas Ayala (since 2025)
- Navarre: María Chivite (since 2014)
- Valencian Community: Diana Morant (since 2024)

=== Membership ===
==== Terms ====
- Baron: unofficial term for the party's regional leaders. They can be very powerful, especially if they run an autonomous community. There have been conflicts between barons and the central directorate in the past. Some barons were Pasqual Maragall (Catalonia), who did not run for re-election in 2006; Juan Carlos Rodríguez Ibarra (Extremadura), who did not run for re-election in 2007; Manuel Chaves (Andalusia), who renounced Andalucia's presidency in 2009 to assume the Third Vice Presidency of the Spanish Government; and José Montilla (Catalonia). The term baron is more colloquial than official, representing the great power regional leaders have in the party, but it has been falling out of use since 2016.
- Compañero ("companion", "comrade"): a term of address among Socialists, analogous to the English comrade and the Russian tovarisch.

==== Factions ====
There have been several currents or internal factions within the PSOE based on personal or ideological affinities. Some of them have ended in splits from the PSOE. Examples of currents include the Terceristas (an historical faction that wished to enter the Third International) and, more recently, Izquierda Socialista (Socialist Left, the left wing of the party since 1979). Some factions have brought infighting to the party, more notably:

- The divide between Guerristas (followers of Alfonso Guerra), and Renovadores (Renewers, right wing of the party).
- More recently, the divide has been between the Sanchistas (followers of Pedro Sánchez) and Susanistas (followers of Susana Díaz). The Sanchistas won in the 2017 primary elections.

== See also ==
- List of political parties in Spain
- Politics of Spain
- First Congress of the PSOE
- Regional Cooperative Federation of Catalonia

== Bibliography ==
- Álvarez Junco, José (2018). "Pablo Iglesias". In Adrian Shubert; José Álvarez Junco (eds.). The History of Modern Spain: Chronologies, Themes, Individuals. Bloomsbury Publishing. pp. 414–420. ISBN 978-1-4725-9198-2.
- Beevor, Antony (2006). 'The battle for Spain. The Spanish civil war. London: Penguin Books. ISBN 0-14-303765-X.
- Anttiroiko, Ari-Veikko; Mälkiä, Matti (2007), Encyclopedia of Digital Government, Idea Group Inc (IGI), 1916, ISBN 978-1-59140-790-4
- Amoretti, Ugo M.; Bermeo, Nancy Gina (2004), Federalism and Territorial Cleavages, JHU Press, p. 498, ISBN 9780801874086
- Bueno Aguado, Mario (2016). "Del PSOE (Histórico) al PASOC. Un acercamiento a su evolución política e ideológica (1972-1986)". Stvdia Historica. Historia Contemporánea. 34. Salamanca: University of Salamanca. ISSN 0213-2087.
- Campoy-Cubillo, Adolfo (2012), Memories of the Maghreb: Transnational Identities in Spanish Cultural Production, Palgrave Macmillan, 230, ISBN 9781137028150
- Casanova, Julián; Gil Andrés, Carlos (2014) [2009]. Twentieth-Century Spain: A History. (translated by Martin Douch). Cambridge University Press. ISBN 978-1-107-01696-5.
- Egido León, Ángeles (2011). "La II República: la caída de la monarquía y el proceso constituyente. El bienio republicano-socialista". Historia Contemporánea de España desde 1923: Dictadura y democracia. Madrid: Editorial Universitaria Ramón Areces & UNED. p. 27. ISBN 978-84-9961-037-5.
- Field, Bonnie N.; Botti, Alfonso (2013), Politics and Society in Contemporary Spain: From Zapatero to Rajoy, Palgrave Macmillan, 256, ISBN 978-1-137-30662-3
- Gibbons, John (1999), Spanish Politics Today, Manchester University Press, 174, ISBN 9780719049460
- Gil Pecharromán, Julio (2015). "Prólogo". El quiebro del PSOE (1933-1934). Tomo 1: Del gobierno a la revolución. by Víctor Manuel Arbeloa (main author). Madrid: ACCI. ISBN 978-84-15705-64-2.
- Graham, Helen (1988). "The Spanish Socialist Party in Power and the Government of Juan Negrín, 1937-9". European History Quarterly. 18 (2): 175–206. doi:10.1177/026569148801800203. S2CID 145387965.
- Heywood, Paul (1987). "Mirror-images: The PCE and PSOE in the transition to democracy in Spain". West European Politics. 10 (2): 193–210. doi:10.1080/01402388708424627.
- — (2002) [1990]. Marxism and the Failure of Organised Socialism in Spain, 1879-1936. Cambridge University Press. ISBN 0-521-37492-8.
- Hoyos Puente, Jorge de (2016). "La evolución del negrinismo en el exilio republicano en México". Historia y Política: Ideas, Procesos y Movimientos Sociales (36). Madrid: UCM; CEPC & UNED: 313–337. doi:10.18042/hp.36.13. ISSN 1575-0361.
- Ruiz Jiménez, Antonia M.; Egea de Haro, Alfonso (2011). "Spain: Euroscepticism in a Pro-European Country?". South European Society and Politics. 16 (1): 105–131. doi:10.1080/13608741003594379. S2CID 154858489.
- Juliá, Santos (1983). "Corporativistas obreros y reformadores políticos: crisis y escisión del PSOE en la II República". Stvdia Historica. Historia Contemporánea. 1. Salamanca: University of Salamanca: 41–52. ISSN 0213-2087.
- Molina Jiménez, Daniel (2013). "La cuestión territorial en el PSOE durante la II República". Estudios Humanísticos. Historia (12). León: University of León: 259–287. doi:10.18002/ehh.v0i12.968. hdl:10612/15770. ISSN 1696-0300.
- Preston, Paul (1978). The Coming of the Spanish Civil War. Macmillan. ISBN 978-0-333-23724-3.
- Quiroga Fernández de Soto, Alejandro (2008). "Amistades peligrosas. La izquierda y los nacionalismos catalanes y vascos (1975-2008)". Historia y Política: Ideas, Procesos y Movimientos Sociales (20). Madrid: UCM; CEPC & UNED: 97–127. ISSN 1575-0361.
- Robles Egea, Antonio (2015). "Las coaliciones de izquierdas en Francia y España (1899-1939)". Cahiers de civilisation espagnole contemporaine (2). Paris: Paris Nanterre University. doi:10.4000/ccec.5404. ISSN 1957-7761.
- Romero Salvadó, Francisco J. (2010). "Spain's Revolutionary Crisis of 1917: A Reckless Gamble". In Francisco J. Romero Salvadó; Angel Smith (eds.). The Agony of Spanish Liberalism. From Revolution to Dictatorship 1913–23. Palgrave Macmillan. pp. 62–91. doi:10.1057/9780230274648. ISBN 978-1-349-36383-4.
- Reynoso, Diego (2004), Votos ponderados: sistemas electorales y sobrerrepresentación distrital, FLACSO México, 249, ISBN 978-970-701-521-0
- Tuñón de Lara, Manuel (1990). "Transformaciones Políticas e Ideológicas de España durante el Primer Tercio del Siglo XX (1898-1936)". Historia Contemporánea (4). Bilbao: University of the Basque Country: 231–259. ISSN 1130-2402.
- Vadillo, Julián (2007). "Desarrollo y debates en los grupos anarquistas de la FAI en el Madrid republicano". Germinal: Revista de estudios libertarios (4): 27–65. ISSN 1886-3019.
