= Regional Cooperative Federation of Catalonia =

The Regional Cooperative Federation of Catalonia (Catalan: Federació Regional de Cooperatives de Catalunya, Spanish: Federación Regional de Cooperativas de Cataluña) was a cooperative federation in Catalonia, Spain. The organization was linked to the Spanish Socialist Workers Party. It played a leading role in the efforts to build a statewide Spanish cooperative movement. It published the weekly Acción Cooperatista. Joan Ventosa i Roig was the chairman of the organization. J. Durán y Guardia was the secretary of the organization.

As of late 1928, the organization claimed to have 27,750 members in 160 affiliated societies. The office of the organization was located at 11, Carrer de Aurora, Barcelona.
