= Microfinance Investment Support Facility for Afghanistan =

The Microfinance Investment Support Facility for Afghanistan (MISFA) was set up in 2003 at the invitation of the Afghan government to streamline collection of donor money and avoid pitfalls arising from conflicting donor interests that had been seen in other post-conflict situations. It was established as a vehicle through which the Afghan government and international donors could channel technical assistance and funding to build Afghanistan's microfinance sector.

In March 2006, MISFA registered as a limited liability, non-profit company whose sole shareholder is the Ministry of Finance of the Islamic Republic of Afghanistan. MISFA Ltd is an independent apex organization with a number of implementing partners on the ground. In most cases, MISFA functions as either the exclusive or primary provider of funds to its partners. The legal status of MFIs has been transformed from NGOs to that of non-profit companies registered with the Afghanistan Investment Support Agency (AISA), as permanent institutions under the law of Afghanistan.
