= Tanzania Federation of Co-operatives =

Tanzania Federation of Co-operatives, earlier known as the Co-operative Union of Tanganyika, is a national organization of co-operative societies in Tanzania. The organization was registered in 1994 with members from Tanzania's Tobacco, Cotton, Coffee, Cashew, Cereal and other produce industries.

The organization was initially established by the Tanzanian government as the Co-operative Union of Tanganyika in 1961, with the general aim to encourage growth of the co-operative movement. The expansion of the co-operative movement was a part of the government's five-year plan for economic development in 1964–1969.
