= Cooperative federation =

Cooperative organization in which all members are cooperatives

A cooperative federation is a trade association whose members are cooperative organizations. As inter-cooperative structures, cooperative federations can also be secondary cooperatives, pooling resources and strengthening business relations among their members. Cooperative federations are a means through which cooperatives can fulfill the sixth Cooperative Principle, cooperation among cooperatives. The International Cooperative Alliance notes that “Cooperatives serve their members most effectively and strengthen the cooperative movement by working together through local, national, regional and international structures.” Historically, cooperative federations have predominantly come in the form of cooperative wholesale societies and cooperative unions.

== Cooperative wholesale societies ==
According to cooperative economist Charles Gide, the aim of a cooperative wholesale society, which is owned by retail consumer cooperatives, is to arrange "bulk purchases, and, if possible, organise production". The best historical examples of this were the English and Scottish Cooperative Wholesale Societies, which were the forerunners to the modern Co-operative Group.

== Cooperative unions ==
A second common form of cooperative federation is a cooperative union, whose objective (according to Gide) is “to develop the spirit of solidarity among societies and... in a word, to exercise the functions of a government whose authority, it is needless to say, is purely moral.” Co-operatives UK and the International Cooperative Alliance are examples of such arrangements.

== Banking ==
- Austria's Raiffeisen Banking Group includes many cooperative banks in Austria as well as operations (not organized as cooperatives) in eastern Europe.
- Germany's Volksbanken and Raiffeisenbanken are cooperative banks within the German Cooperative Financial Group.
- France's Crédit Agricole is a multi-tiered network of primary and secondary cooperatives and hybrid cooperatives.
- In the UK, The Co-operative Bank is a joint-stock retail and commercial bank, whose stock was once wholly owned by The Cooperative Group, a hybrid primary and secondary cooperative.
- In the US, credit unions cooperatively own payment networks and financial advisers.
- In Canada, most credit unions, outside of Quebec, are members of the Canadian Credit Union Association. In Quebec, most credit unions are a part of the Desjardins Group. Desjardins states it is the largest federation of credit unions in North America with 293 credit unions.
- In South Korea, National Agricultural Cooperative Federation is a multi-purpose agricultural cooperatives' federation.
- In Mexico, Caja Popular Mexicana, a loan and savings cooperative with more than 3.9 million members, is a member of the World Council of Credit Unions.

== Agriculture ==
Regional agricultural cooperatives, such as Land O'Lakes and the former Farmland Industries, are cooperative federations owned by local farmers' cooperatives. Like the Co-operative Group, Land O'Lakes is actually a hybrid of a primary and secondary cooperative.

== Cooperative party ==
In some countries, such as the UK, cooperatives have organized parliamentary political parties to represent their interests. The British Co-operative Party is an example of such an arrangement.

== Other uses ==
Cooperatives whose member owners are businesses, such as retailers' cooperatives, are sometimes called secondary cooperatives, even when their members are not themselves cooperatives.

== See also ==
- List of cooperative federations
