= Francisco Estévanez Rodríguez =

Spanish politician (1880–1953)

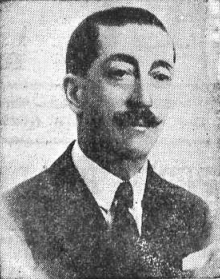
- Born: Francisco Estévanez Rodríguez; 1880; Burgos, Spain
- Died: 1953 (aged 72–73); Burgos, Spain
- Occupations: lawyer, landowner
- Known for: politician
- Political party: Integrism, Carlism

Francisco Estévanez Rodríguez (1880–1953) was a Spanish politician, publisher, philanthropist, agrarian syndicalist and religious activist. He is best known as deputy to the Cortes during two terms between 1931 and 1936. Politically he was a Traditionalist, first member of the Integrist branch and then active within Carlism. He also published two small Burgos periodicals, continuously donated money and supported various charity schemes, strove to build rural trade unions which unite landholders and farmers, and was involved in numerous Catholic initiatives usually related to the Burgos archbishopric office.

== Family and youth ==
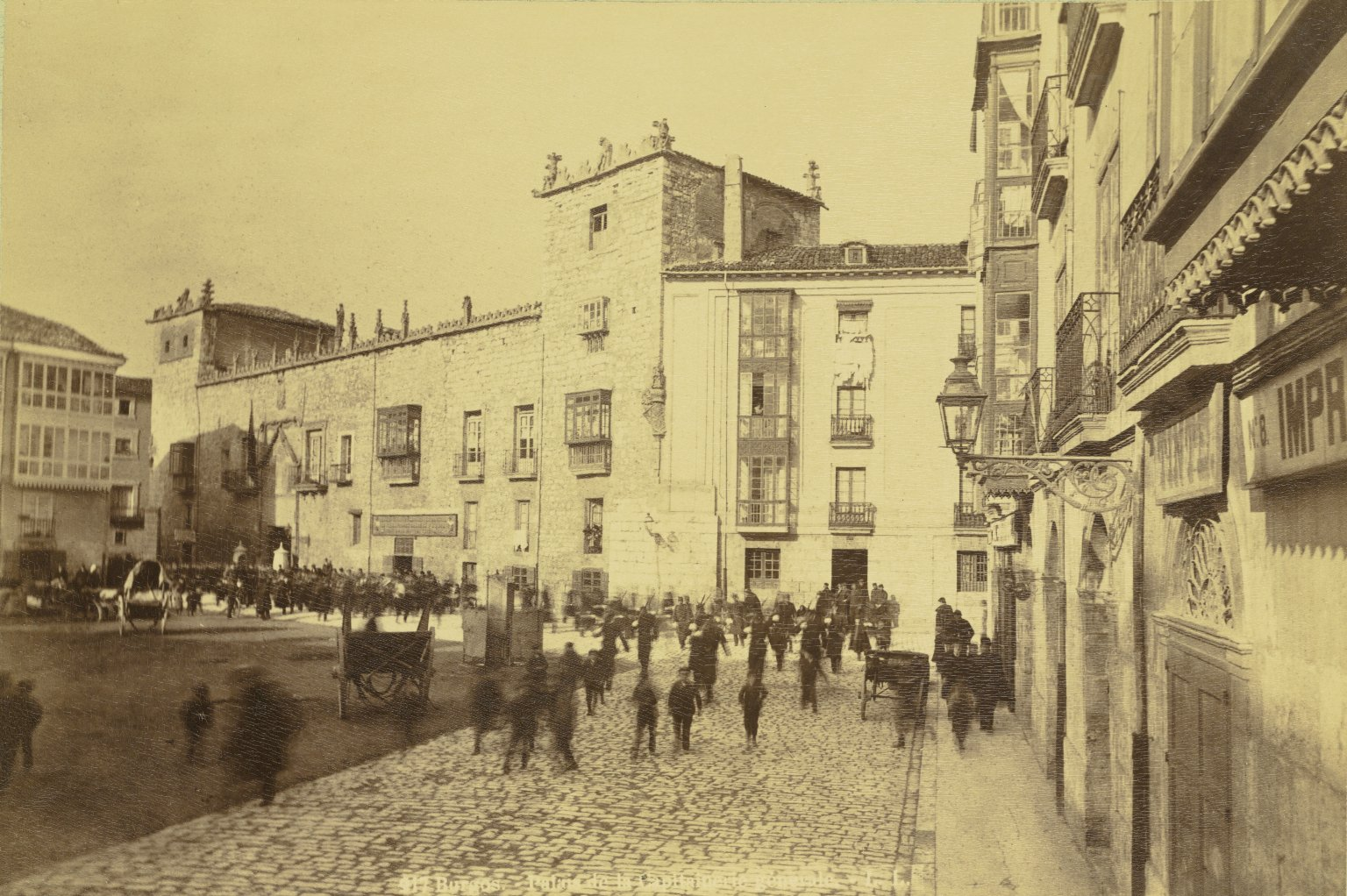
Burgos, late 19th century

The Estévanez family was related to northern Castile, to the area at the confluence of Santander, Burgos and Palencia provinces; the paternal grandfather of Francisco, Valentín Estévanez Sainz de Baranda y Terán, originated from Soncillo. Social status of the Estévanez is not clear. It seems that they either belonged or aspired to petty nobility, the hidalguia. On the one hand, Valentín was noted as owner of an unspecified estate; on the other, he practiced as a physician. His daughter and the aunt of Francisco, Margarita Estévanez Mazón, was a nun and grew to abbess of the Augustine convent in Burgos. His son and the father of Francisco, Aquilino Estévanez Mazón (died 1901), studied medicine in Madrid and also became a doctor. One more son of Valentín was a pharmacist.

In the 1870s Aquilino married María Rodríguez, descendant to a noble and much better positioned Rodríguez family from Burgos. Her aunt, María Benita Rodríguez Macho, in 1867-1870 served as abbess of the iconic Real Monasterio de las Huelgas abbey; her uncle, Tiburcio Rodríguez Calderón de Thorices, was first a catedrático of theology in Colegio Español in Rome, then canónigo peniternciario serving in the Burgos cathedral, and finally a Jesuit scholar. It is not clear where Aquilino and María settled initially; later they were related to Burgos, Valdeolea and Mataporquera. The couple had at least 5 children including Francisco, probably 3 of them boys and 2 girls. One brother of Francisco became a lawyer; one sister entered a monastery and served as a Catholic nun.

None of the sources consulted provides any information on early education of the young Francisco. In 1897 he was called into the army and if served indeed he was posted to a garrison on the peninsula. According to one rather unfriendly source Francisco intended to be a religious and studied in an unspecified seminary, but he fell in love and when forced to choose between priesthood and marriage he opted for the latter. It is certain that he studied law, but details are not clear; most likely he pursued academic career in Salamanca in the early 1900s. Following graduation he was sworn as abogado in Burgos in 1904 and commenced the law practice in the city.

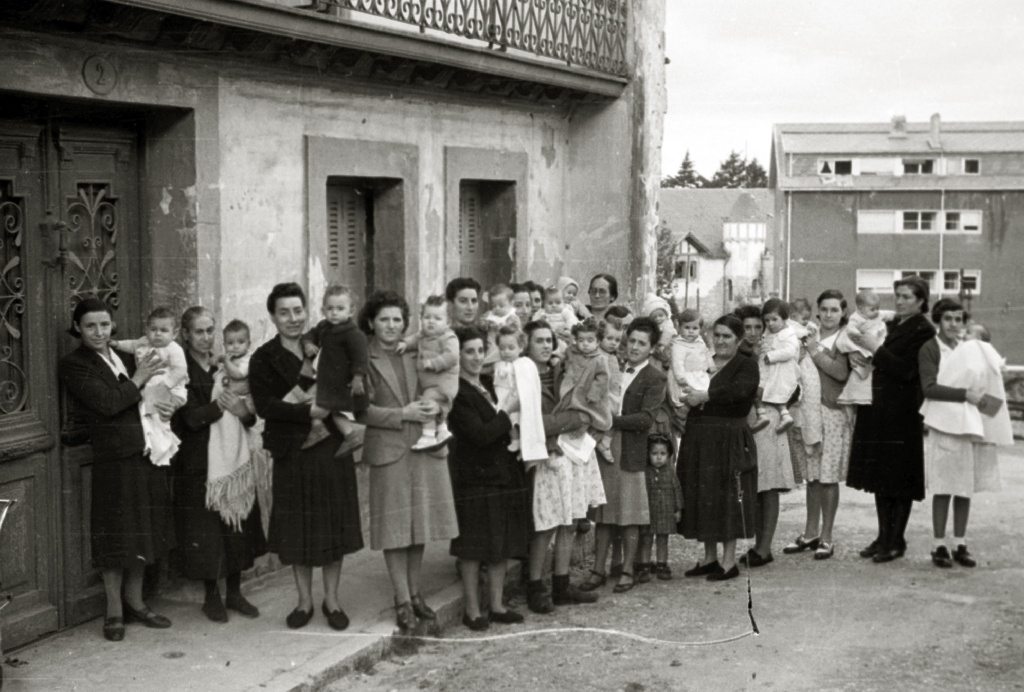
charity action, Spain 1946 (sample)

Estévanez was rumored to marry an unnamed "distinguida señorita" in 1904, but he actually wed in 1911. The bride was Carmen Obesso Palacio (1885-1976), it is not clear whether the same girl as he had been reported to marry 7 years earlier. Related to Mazandrero and Aguilar del Campóo, she was descendant to a prestigious local family of landowners and was Estévanez' distant relative. The couple settled in Burgos at Calle Nuño Basura 16, in the immediate vicinity of the cathedral. They had no own children. However, Francisco and Carmen acted as godparents to tens if not hundreds of children from poor families, which implied financial aid and general assistance; they were first noted in such role in 1914, and later also in 1923, 1944 and 1947.

== Early Integrist engagements ==
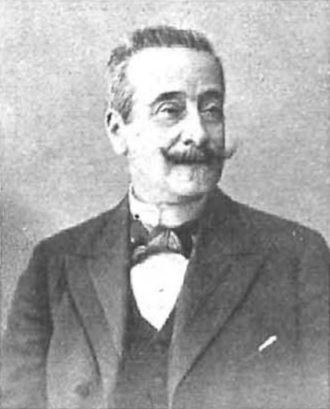
Ramón Nocedal

Both paternal and maternal ancestors of Estévanez were Carlists. His maternal uncle Tiburcio Rodríguez could have been involved in the 1869 assassination of the Burgos anticlerical civil governor Isidoro Gutiérrez; he was later persecuted and joined headquarters of Carlos VII during the Third Carlist War. It is there where he met the father of Francisco, Aquilino, a young medic serving in the Carlist general staff. However, in the 1880s Aquilino Estévanez joined the Carlist breakaway faction, first known as Nocedalistas and later as the Integrists. The young Francisco was growing up as an Integro; already as a boy he was listed along his father and brothers as financially contributing to the homage of Félix Sardá y Salvany, one of the chief theorists of the group. In his teen years he started publishing in the Integrist Madrid daily El Siglo Futuro; the first piece identified comes from 1897. In 1901 in an open letter to the Integrist leader Ramón Nocedal he fully embraced the intransigent and vehemently anti-liberal politico-religious program of the group.

Prior to 1904 Estévanez purchased a local Burgos daily El Castellano, founded in 1900 as "diario católico de información general". He turned it into a belligerent Integrist press tribune which vehemently advocated adamant Catholic stand. His zeal produced conflicts and incidents; at one point he resigned from the director job but he kept contributing, not a step deviating from the fixed line which hailed great Christians confronting sinister Liberalism. Some of his pieces were re-printed in other periodicals, yet it seems at one point – perhaps as late as in the 1910s – he either sold or otherwise lost control of El Castellano. Another thread of his religious activity was charity, to become his trademark later on; from his teens engaged in organizations like Congregación de San Luis Gonzaga he took part in numerous juntas and committees. Energetic in the Burgos Integrist organization, in 1906 he grew to secretary of Junta Integrista Regional for the entire Old Castile region.

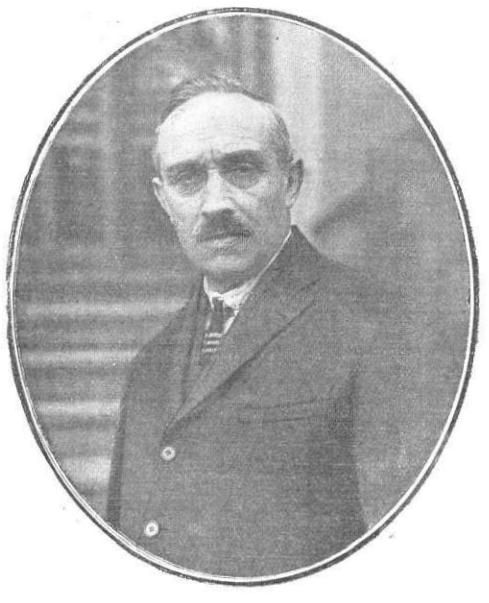
Juan Olazabal

As his law career progressed and in 1909 Estévanez was sworn as magistrado suplente of Audiencia de Burgos his prestige grew and his position strengthened. As Integrist politician he did not share the earlier anti-Carlist venom of the group and in 1910 he was noted speaking at a Catholic rally in Palencia jointly with Carlist militants Larramendi, Bilbao and Polo. The same year he was about to launch his first bid for the Cortes, and in Cervera de Pisuerga he was reported to stand as a joint Traditionalist candidate. His candidacy was agreed with the Carlist leader Feliú though it is not clear whether it was approved by the new Integrist leader, Olazábal; it seems that he withdrew in the last minute. In 1911 he was supposed to run on a joint Catholic anti-Liberal ticket in by-elections in Miranda del Ebro, but there is no confirmation of him actually standing. In the mid-1910s he focused on his law career and charity; there is no information on his political engagements.

== Late Restoration and Dictatorship ==
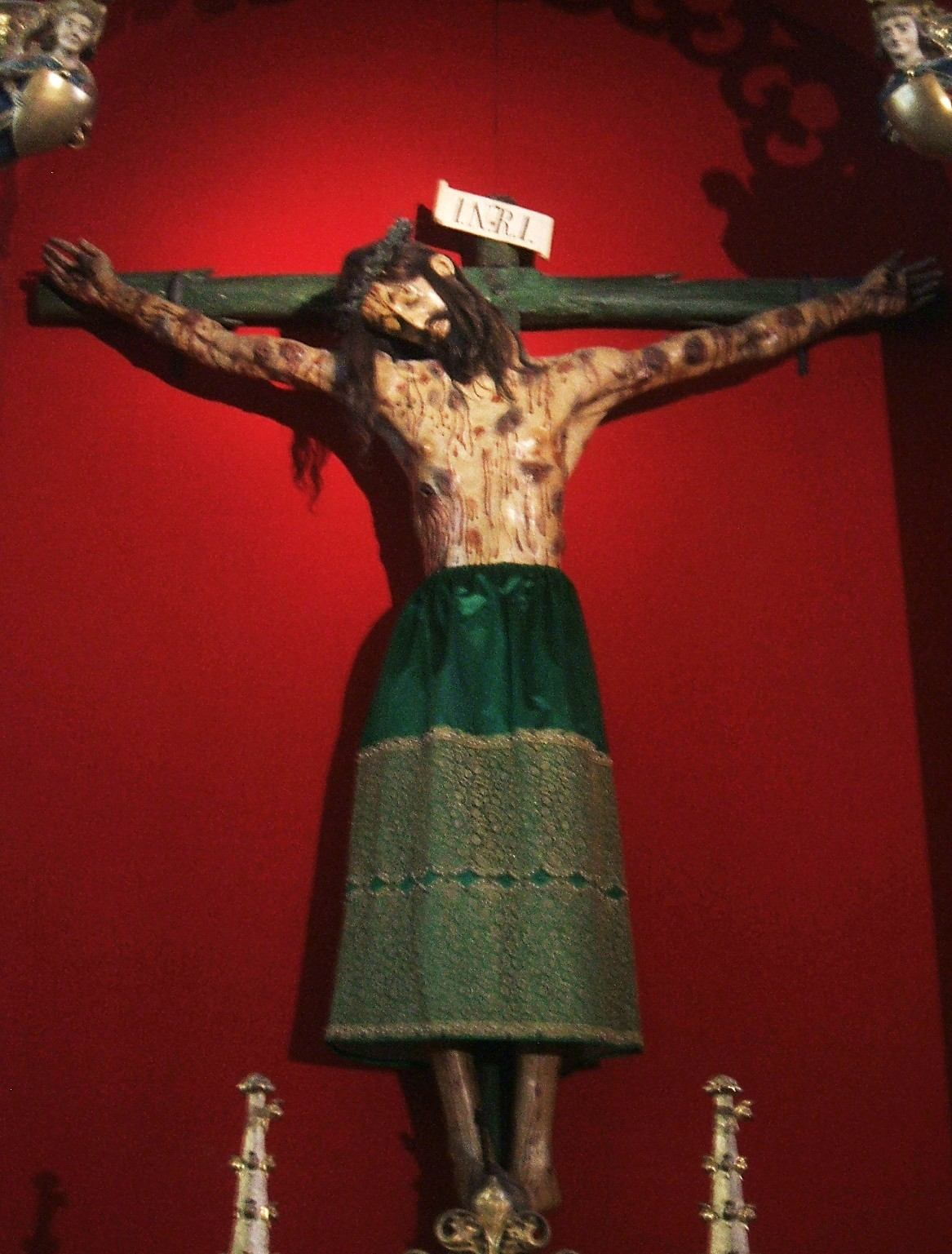
Cristo de Burgos

When approaching 40 years of age Estévanez was a locally recognized Burgos figure, known mostly for his law practice and religious charity initiatives. It seems also that having inherited and married into rural estates, he was increasingly involved in buildup of agrarian syndicates which would unite both landowners and farmers. In the early 1920s he started to publish El Defensor de los Labradores, a periodical which advanced the cause. His political weight was moderate. He gradually made it to the Spanish Integrist executive and during a 1918 general party assembly Estévanez was listed among heavyweights, entrusted with co-heading "Organización y Juventudes" section; in 1920 he served as jefe of the provincial Integrist organization. However, his renewed attempts to enter nationwide politics failed. In the last general elections of the Alfonsist monarchy in 1923 he ran as "católico agrario" and narrowly lost to a conservative counter-candidate.

In the early 1920s Estévanez got engaged in missionary activity centered in Burgos and launched by the newly appointed archbishop of Burgos Juan Benlloch; acting on direct instructions of the pope Benedict XV, Benlloch tried to convert an earlier Colegio de Ultramar into Seminario de Misiones, a future hub of apostolic action overseas. In 1921 Estévanez travelled to Cuba, possibly on a related mission; in 1922 he was already in close entourage of Benlloch, who grew to cardinal in the meantime. Named gentilhombre de cámara and camarero secreto of the archbishop, in 1923-1924 Estévanez accompanied Benlloch on a long religious and political mission to America, which involved visits to Cuba, Peru and Chile. In the mid- and late 1920s he was greatly engaged in numerous Catholic religious initiatives in Burgos, co-organizing feasts, sponsoring various associations or welcoming ecclesiastic hierarchs. With no children on their own, both Estévanez and his wife remained very active in charity, be it in Cruz Roja or in education. In truly Integrist fashion his stand demonstrated an amalgam of personal, religious and political features, though his zeal produced also lawsuits.

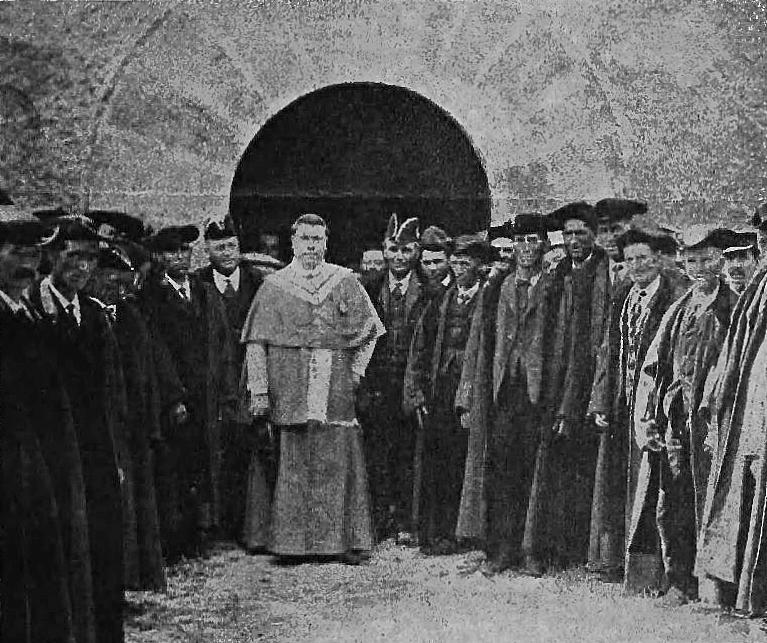
Juan Benlloch (middle)

There is no information on Estévanez engaging in primoderiverista institutions like Unión Patriótica or Somatén, though it is likely that close to Benlloch, he at least initially viewed the regime favorably; Estévanez is only known to have contributed to general patriotic initiatives of the regime. He kept advocating Christian syndicalist solidarity when publishing El Defensor de los Labradores and it is likely that at one point in the late 1920s he regained control over El Castellano. Apart from his agrarian economy he obtained a license for operating bus connection between Burgos and Aguilar del Campóo and to handle post services on the route. Last but not least, Estévanez was active building up a network of Catholic agrarian syndicates, according to himself striving to build "clase social agro-pecuaria organizada" in the province.

== Late Integrist projects ==
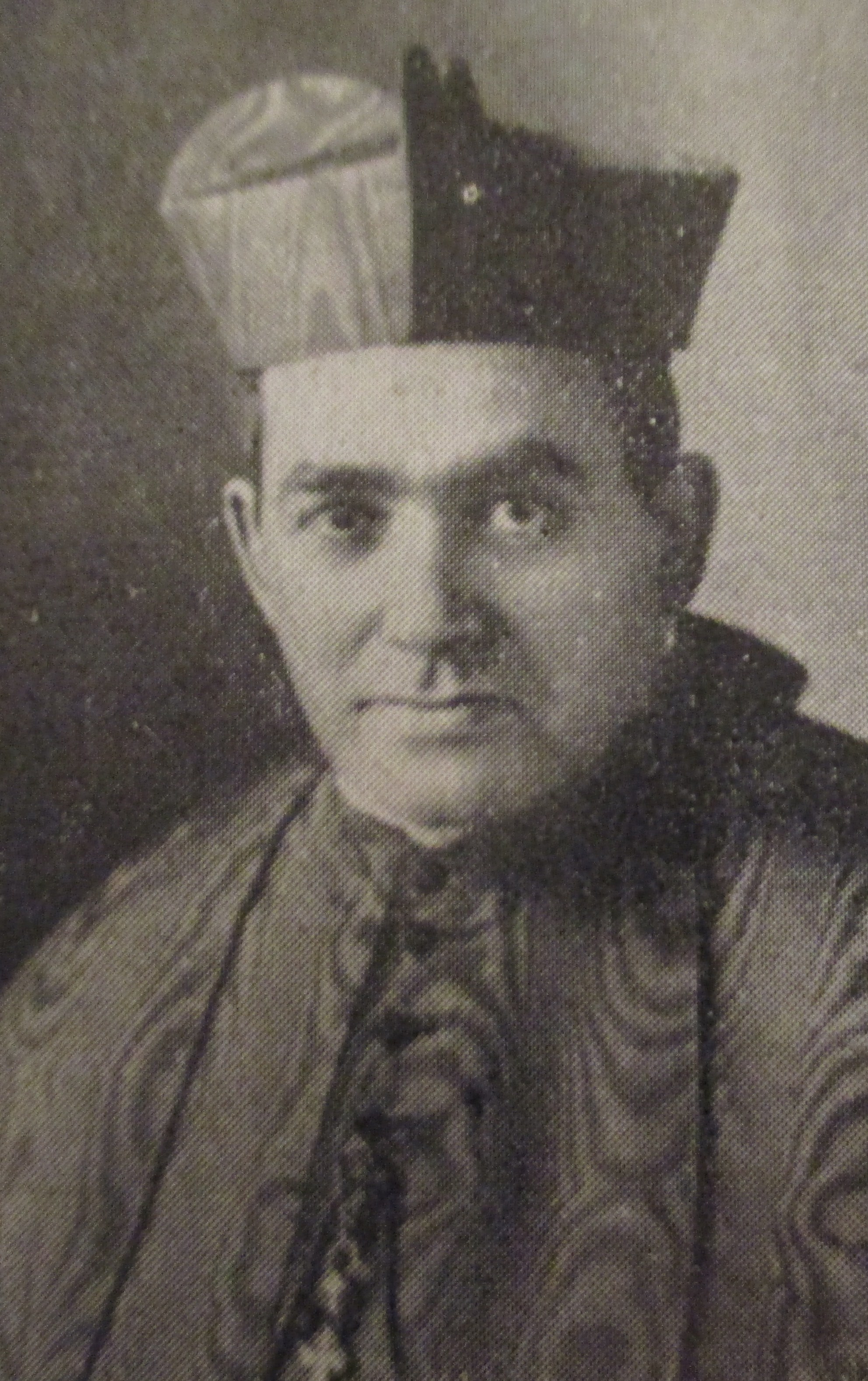
cardenal Segura

In the spring of 1930, shortly after the fall of Primo de Rivera, Estévanez assumed a more active political stance. In line with recommendations of the primate Pedro Segura (whom he knew from Segura's Burgos archbishopric term of 1926–1927) and in co-operation with the Burgos archbishop Manuel de Castro he tried to mount a grand Catholic provincial political organization, "unión habitual fuera de partidos y a los fines unicamente de la Religión y de la Patria". Nothing came out of these schemes; also their scaled-down version, a temporary general alliance possibly centered around the Integrist nucleus failed to materialize. In late 1930 and early 1931 he seemed already focused merely on reconstruction of the Integrist structures, e.g. lobbying with Segura about clerical subscriptions to El Siglo Futuro, and on general Catholic propaganda.

During the first republican campaign to the Cortes of June 1931 the Burgos Integrists joined forces with Partido Agrario; it seems that Estévanez personally negotiated the provincial alliance with leader of the Agrarians, José Martinez de Velasco. The result was a common list known as "Candidatura Católico-Agraria", by some scholars referred to as "en realidad tradicionalista". Both Estévanez' periodicals, El Castellano and El Defensór de Labradores, staged a propaganda campaign on his behalf. His former record in charity and in agrarian syndicates also greatly worked to his advantage, especially in the countryside, though some scholars prefer rather to stress his position in "oligarquía burgalesa". His bid proved successful and Estévanez was among 3 Integrists who obtained the Cortes ticket; once in the chamber, they all joined the Agrarian minority; some scholars count him among the Agrarians even though Estévanez identified himself as an Integrist.

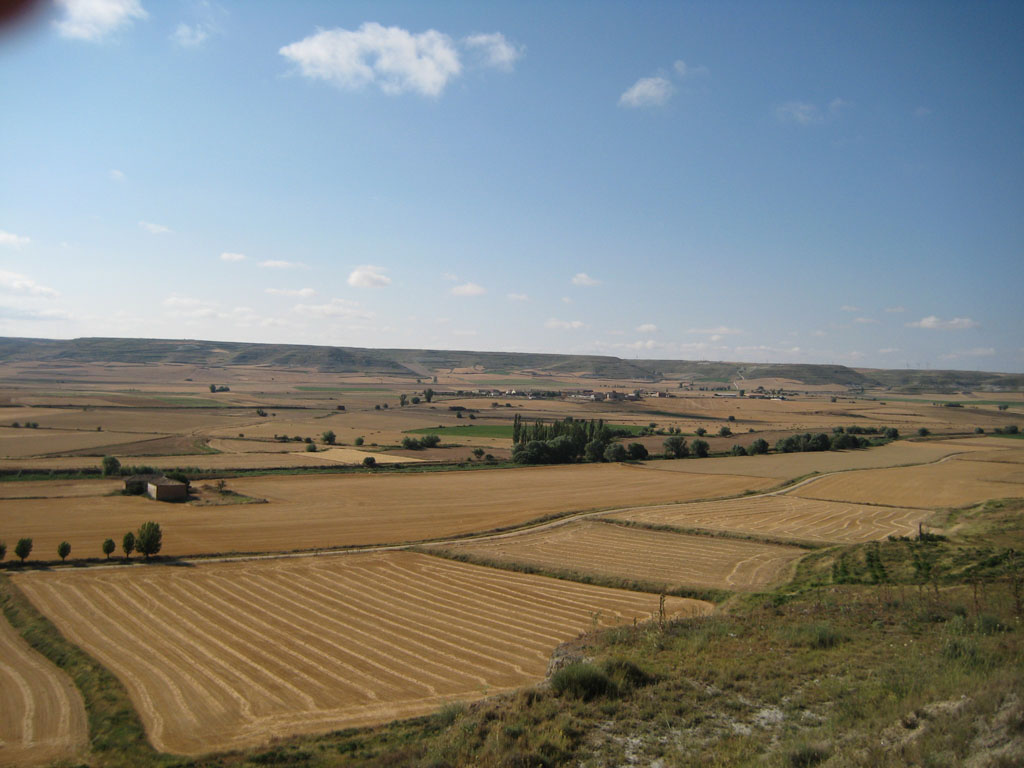
wheat fields, Castile

In the parliament Estévanez joined Comisión de Estado, but he gained some sort of notoriety during the plenary sessions. This was due to his grandiose apology of Spanish Catholic tradition, claim that all public power comes from the Almighty and challenging fellow deputies by asking whether they read the Gospel, to which many cheerfully responded either to the negative or with laughter. As a result, he gained opinion of one of the most reactionary deputies, sort of a prehistoric relic, mocked as fanatic, extravagant and picturesque ridicule; some dubbed him "cavernícola de las estalatitas". Undeterred, in one of the opening Cortes sessions when discussing reported extremism of the Left he declared the government responsible and warned that "the Republic was already reaping a revolutionary harvest from the seeds it had sown itself". In practical terms he opposed secular education designs and legislation aimed against religious orders. Another visible thread of his activity was related to defense of the agrarian status quo, at least in Castile. By some historians named "one of most powerful landowners" of the Burgos province he is considered a spokesman "for cereal growers' interests in Castilla" who zealously defended their interests and was a perfect embodiment of "common interests between landowners, order and religion".

== Carlist ==
Carlist standard

Some scholars refer to Estévanez of early 1931 as "integrista carlista", claim that El Castellano ran a Carlist campaign or vaguely note him against the Carlist background, yet there is no confirmation of his Carlist identity prior to late 1931. At the time Estévanez supported the party leader Olazábal in his strategy of re-unification with the Carlists. In December he participated in a Madrid conference attended by many Integrist and Carlist heavyweights; in a grand lecture he de-emphasized Integrist threads and dwelled on common Traditionalist principles, though he remained silent on usual Carlist dynastic objectives. The rapprochement was complete in the spring of 1932, when already as member of the united Carlist organization Comunión Tradicionalista he started to appear on public rallies. In the 1933 electoral campaign Estévanez ran as a Traditionalist hopeful within Candidatura de las Derechas and triumphed comfortably; this time he entered the Carlist minority.

Though Estévanez used to join trademark Carlist initiatives like legislation against freemasonry and shared the party intransigence when declaring that "adhesionismo a este régimen es imposible", within the party he was not particularly distinguished. He did not assume any major post in the organization, was only mentioned in a Carlist luxury publication which hailed 100 years of the movement barely spoke at rallies and did not publish in party newspapers. None of the scholarly historiographic works notes him as involved in forging the party line, except that in controversies on closing a monarchist alliance with the Alfonsists he sided with advocates of this option.

As belligerent president of Cámara Oficial Agrícola de Burgos Estévanez focused on agriculture. He vehemently opposed governmental agrarian reform which he considered socialist; though he supported growth of the class of rural owner farmers he envisaged the process as based on credit, syndicates, and agricultural organizations, not on state socialism. In defense of private property he also lobbied for flexible application of new regulations like términos municipales or jurados mixtos; when speaking to minister of labor he described these measures as undermining Castilian rural life. He lobbied for protective measures against wheat imports and control of prices, though in general he preferred the wholesale trade be left to syndicates and agricultural chambers. Facing his onslaught the ministry of agriculture stroke back and charged the organizations he headed with poor organization.

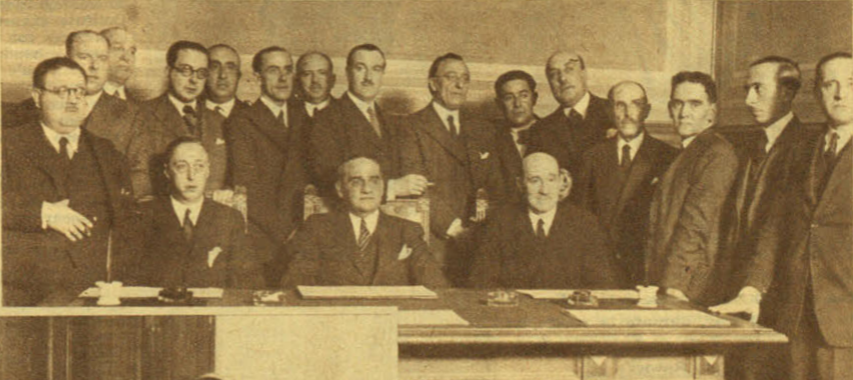
Carlists in an electoral committee, 1930s

During the 1936 electoral campaign Estévanez stood in Burgos as a Traditionalist candidate of Frente Contrarrevolucionario de Derechas alliance and won comfortably. However, his ticket was annulled by the Frente-Popular-dominated Cortes, since as involved in negotiation of government grain contracts he was reportedly in violation of the electoral law. Neither in 1931 nor in 1933 was he challenged on similar grounds; as tens of right-wing tickets were cancelled at the same time, in historiography the 1936 process of their validation is at times considered "worst and most audacious fraud". Deprived of his parliamentary tribune, Estévanez used his position of head of Federación Católico Agraria Burgalesa to lobby about wheat contracts, trade barriers and price regulations.

== Civil War: enthusiast turned skeptic ==
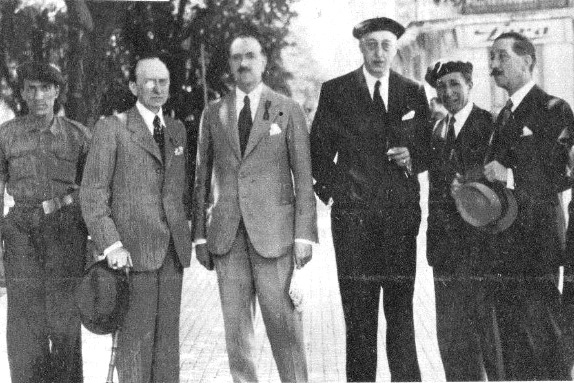
Estévanez (1st f/R) and other Carlists in Burgos, 1937

It is not clear whether Estévanez took part in the Carlist conspiracy against the Republic. However, immediately after the rebels had taken control of Burgos he published a large article which hailed the insurgents and dwelled on their patriotic stand against the background of such historical events like the battle of Las Navas de Tolosa. In mid-August he was among the city personalities who welcomed Franco in Burgos, yet there is no information on Estévanez assuming any position either in the local administration or in the Carlist wartime executive, despite the fact that Junta Nacional Carlista de Guerra partially resided in Burgos and many party leaders moved to the city, the informal capital of the Nationalist zone. Amidst the wave of rearguard repression Estévanez called for order and in press piece wrote that "let there be not a single individual who takes justice into his own hands! Justice yes, but by means of appropriate procedures and competent tribunals!". It is likely that in September he contributed to release of Manuel Machado, few days earlier arrested in his office.

In wake of the forced political unification of April 1937 Estévanez was applauded in heavily censored press as a champion of patriotic movement, "nosotros carlistas y vosotros fascistas" who fought against "servants of Russia", yet it is not clear whether he actually supported the merger. He did not assume any post in the newly created state party, Falange Española Tradicionalista, and there is no information he accepted its ticket; similarly no source confirms he continued as independent Carlist. He remained active in Cámara Agrícola and used his links in Latin America to raise support for the Nationalists. In mid-1937 he was admitted by Gómez-Jordana, president of the quasi-government Junta Técnica del Estado, yet it is not clear what issues they discussed. Estévanez kept practicing as a lawyer and in this role he defended individuals charged with politically flavored crimes, he went on with charity action and was involved in running the Burgos Hogar del Herido.

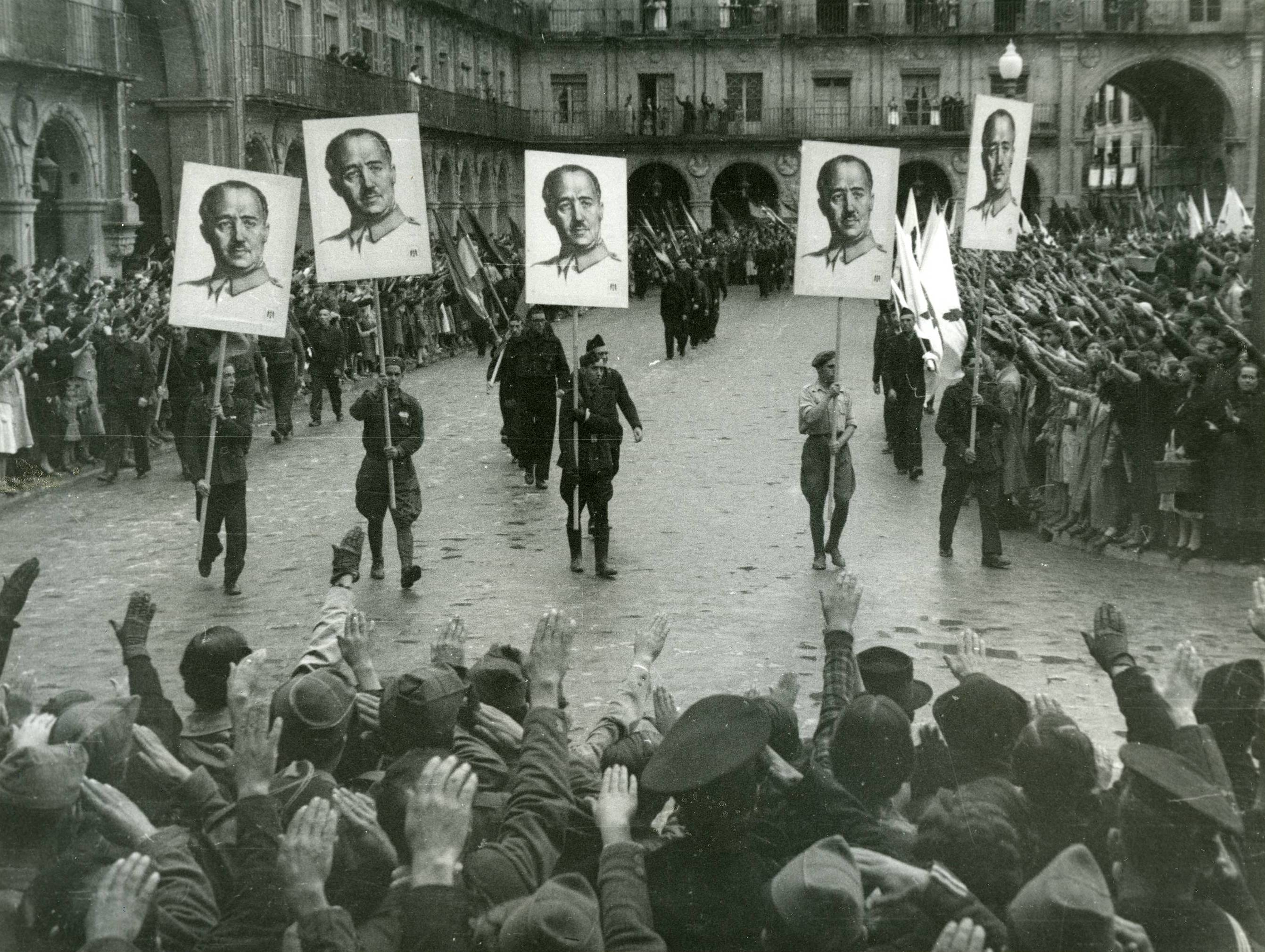
nueva Babilonia?

In early 1938 it was already evident that Estévanez got hugely disappointed with the emerging Francoist regime. In private correspondence with cardenal Segura he heavily criticized pro-German stand, censorship and Fuero del Trabajo, which advanced "organización corporativa contranatural". He declared not understanding "how they intend to found a Catholic state by negating true liberty"; he also lambasted "nueva Babilonia" which "pretends to be a Catholic state but which imitates neo-pagan social structures". In mid-1938 he was already in conflict with the Francoist administration; the new restrictive Ley de Prensa was intended to drive independent newspapers out of the market and spelled problems to his newspapers. Estévanez requested help on part of religious administration and the primate Goma; it is possible that he actually transferred ownership of El Castellano, at the time issued twice a day in a morning and evening edition, to the Toledo curia. The maneuvers did not help and both newspapers closed down either in 1939 or slightly later.

== Francoism and after ==
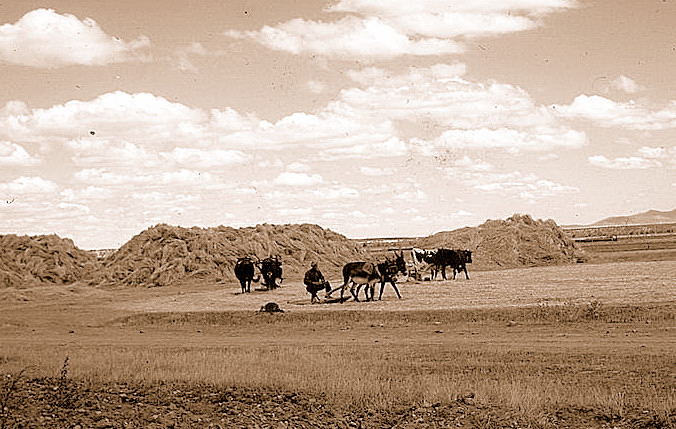
working the fields, Francoism

There is scarce information on Estévanez' public activity after the Civil War. None of the sources consulted notes him as involved in political activities, either within Carlism or any other structures; in police files he appeared as "desafecto totalmente a FET y de las JONS". He seemed rather focused on agricultural organizations. In 1939 he was among co-founders of a re-created Confederación Nacional Católico-Agraria, the nationwide Catholic agricultural trade union, yet he did not enter its executive; the following year the syndicate lost its autonomy and identity, forcibly incorporated into the Falangist Delegación Nacional de Sindicatos. Estévanez was then noted as involved in local organizations of wheat producers, notably in the mid-1940s he acted as president of Cámara Oficial Agrícola in the Burgos province, heavily engaged in trade, distribution and quality control. It seems also that the chamber made some effort to protect small producers; as the 1940s were in Spain the years of food shortages and hunger, the position of Estévanez rendered him a locally prominent person. As to his own economy he held some rural estates in the provinces of Burgos, Santander and elsewhere, apart from urban property in the immediate vicinity of the Burgos cathedral; it is not clear whether after the Civil War he kept practicing as a lawyer.

Another thread of Estévanez' post-war activity was traditionally charity. Apart from personally supporting children from poor families he acted as member of Junta Directiva of Congregación Mariana de Caballeros. In the mid- and late 1940s the Estévanez couple at least twice travelled to Latin America and at least some of these journeys were related to charity and religion, as he was noted as involved in the Cuban Sociedad Benéfica Burgalesa. It is not clear whether he was awarded the Chilean Medalla de Merito and the Peruvian Sol del Peru during his 1940s visits or during the earlier 1920s trips with cardenal Benlloch. Estévanez appeared in the Burgos press societé columns or as involved in local religious feasts until the early 1950s, always noted as a respected and prestigious citizen. However, his death was not acknowledged by nationwide media and he soon went into almost total oblivion; his memory was not cherished by Carlism of the late Francoism and is absent also in the present-day Carlist propaganda. Except a minor related piece he has not earnt a monograph; when mentioned in historiographic works he is usually presented as a reactionary landowner busy with preserving social inequality in rural Castile. The figure of Estévanez made a marginal and peculiar entry into literature; as a secondary character he appears in Inquietud en el Paraíso by Óscar Esquivias. The 2005 novel is set in Burgos before and during the outbreak of the Civil War; Estévanez is pictured in an episode possibly related to actual events, namely when introducing Manuel Machado to general Fidel Dávila.

== See also ==
- Traditionalism (Spain)
- Carlism
- Integrism (Spain)
- El Castellano (1900-1940)
