= Integrism (Spain) =

Conservative Spanish political philosophy

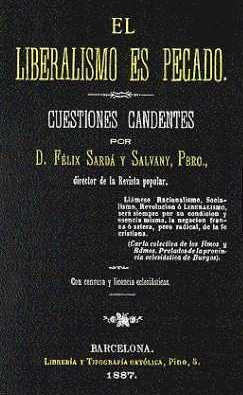
Liberalism Is a Sin, 1887

Integrism is a Spanish political philosophy prominent during the late 19th and early 20th century. Rooted in conservative Catholic groupings like Neo-Catholics or Carlists, the Integrists represented the most right-wing formation of the Restoration political spectrum. Their vision discarded religious tolerance and embraced a state constructed along strictly Catholic lines.

The Integrists opposed Liberalism and the parliamentarian system, advocating an accidentalist organic regime. Led first by Ramón Nocedal Romea and then by Juan Olazábal Ramery they were active as a political structure named Partido Católico Nacional (also known as Partido Integrista), but the group retained influence mostly thanks to an array of periodicals, headed by the Madrid-based El Siglo Futuro. Though Integrism enjoyed some momentum when it formally emerged in the late 1880s, it was soon reduced to a third-rate political force and eventually amalgamated within Carlism in the early 1930s.

== Origins ==
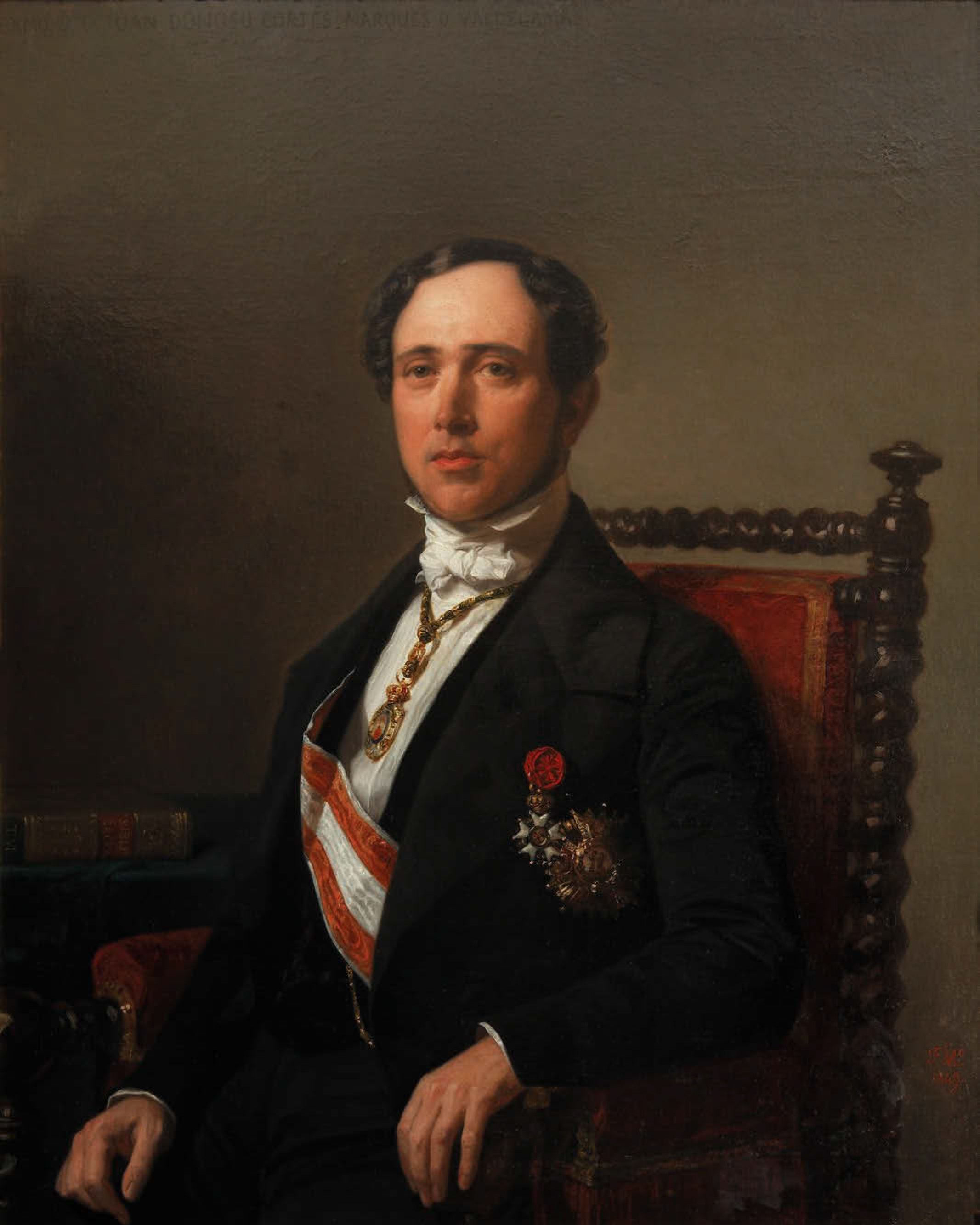
Juan Donoso Cortés

The role of religion and the Roman Catholic Church has been a point of heated political debate in Spain since the Napoleonic era, with waves of secularization and de-secularization following each other as the country was undergoing a half-century long, turbulent period of political instability. During declining years of the Isabelline monarchy of the 1860s different breeds of Liberalism sought to curtail the position of the Church still further. They were most vehemently opposed by two political groupings, both considered Integrist predecessors.

The so-called neocatólicos was an intellectual movement initiated during the early Isabelline years; its founding fathers, Juan Donoso Cortés and Jaime Balmes, tried to accommodate orthodox Catholicism within a framework of the liberal monarchy. With leaders like Antonio Aparisi, Cándido Nocedal, Francisco Navarro Villoslada, Gabino Tejado and Ramón Vinader, in the 1860s the neos strove to save the crumbling rule of Isabel II by building a grand, ultraconservative Catholic party. Their project crashed during the Glorious Revolution of 1868; in the early 1870s they concluded that the Liberal sway can no longer be confronted by constitutional monarchy and that a more radical response is needed.

Carlism emerged as an ultraconservative, anti-liberal and fanatically Catholic opposition to the Isabelline monarchy. Advocating the dynastic claim of another Borbón branch, the Carlists, nominally led by successive claimants, repeatedly attempted to overthrow Isabel II by means of military insurgence. Unlike the neos, from the onset they refused to accept the rules of constitutional monarchy and advocated the regime of a pre-modern kingdom. The Carlist ideology, though also very much centered on religion, was not exclusively focused on it; their ideario also comprised the defense of traditional regional establishments and dynastic claims. While neos remained mostly a group of urban intellectuals, Carlism was powered by popular rural Catholicism, which dominated some regions of Spain.

== Integrism nascent, 1870–1888 ==
The revolution of 1868, the brief rule of Amadeo I, the emergence of the First Spanish Republic and especially another wave of militantly secular Liberalism drew the neocatólicos and the Carlists together. Starting in 1870 the neos, led by Antonio Aparisi Guijarro, began to join Carlist political structures and abandoned a separate political project of their own. Following the 1876 legitimist defeat in the Third Carlist War, with many traditional Carlist leaders being exiled or forced into seclusion, it was the former Neo-Catholics, usually not compromised by military action, who gradually started to emerge as leading pundits of semi-legal Carlism.

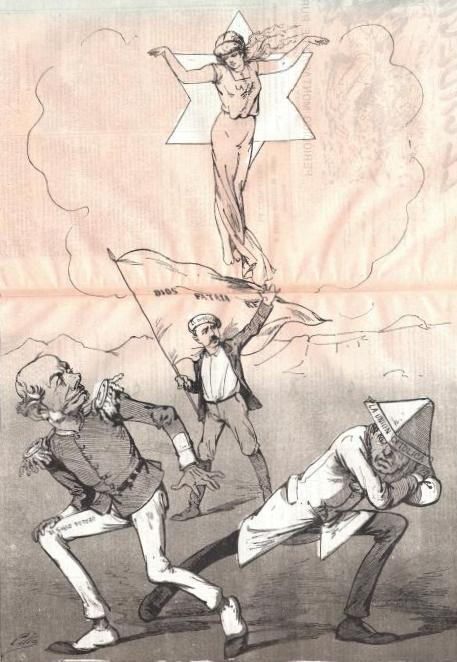
guerra periodística - contemporary cartoon

After death of Aparisi leadership of the group was assumed by Cándido Nocedal, already during the war the key Carlist representative on the Republic-controlled territory. As early as 1875 he set up the Madrid-based El Siglo Futuro which soon turned into a combative press tribune, formatted as the semi-veiled Carlism-leaning orthodox Catholic daily. Within Carlism, Nocedal represented the trend known as inmovilismo or retraimiento, pursuing abstention in official political life and trying to mobilize support along purely Catholic lines, like the massive 1876 pilgrimage to Rome. Prevailing over the competitive group known as aperturistas, in 1879 Nocedal was officially nominated the claimant's political representative and firmly focused Carlist activities on religious issues. Opposition to Pidalistas, the Traditionalists who – guided by the principle of Catholic unity – accepted the Restoration project in the early 1880s helped to format the Nocedalistas as religious intransigents; this was to be reflected in another pilgrimage, planned for 1882.

The course adopted by Nocedal and his son Ramón generated opposition within Carlism; many of its bigwigs grew anxious not only about Nocedals’ decisive leadership style but also because the movement had stalled in what they perceived was an ineffective intransigence and an apparent marginalization of other, traditional Carlist ideological threads. The conflict soon evolved into a bitter guerra periodistica, usually fought on religious grounds; titles supporting both factions claimed to have represented the genuine faith against the arbitrary usurpation of their opponents. The fray took a new turn when Cándido Nocedal died in 1885 and Ramón was not nominated his successor; the years leading to 1888 are marked by internal strife, decomposition and growing paralysis of Carlism.

== 1888 breakup ==
In 1888 the usual skirmishes between Carlist newspapers suddenly exploded when the prestige of the claimant got involved. Because Nocedal refused to budge, in August, Carlos VII expelled him from Carlism. Nocedal and his followers left to build their own political formation, soon to be known as Integrism. Though according to the traditional judgment the 1888 breakup resulted chiefly from Nocedal's overgrown ambitions or at best from the clash of personalities, today most scholars agree that ideological conflict constituted an important if not a vital component of the secession.

Most students of the subject place religion at the core of the conflict, though it can also be viewed from different perspectives. Some present the friction as growing competition between two visions of Carlism, pointing that while Nocedal clearly aimed at formatting the movement along religious lines and at reducing monarchical, dynastical and fuerista threads to secondary roles, Carlos VII intended to keep balance between all components of Traditionalist ideario. In partisan versions, both parties claimed that they represented genuine Traditionalism.

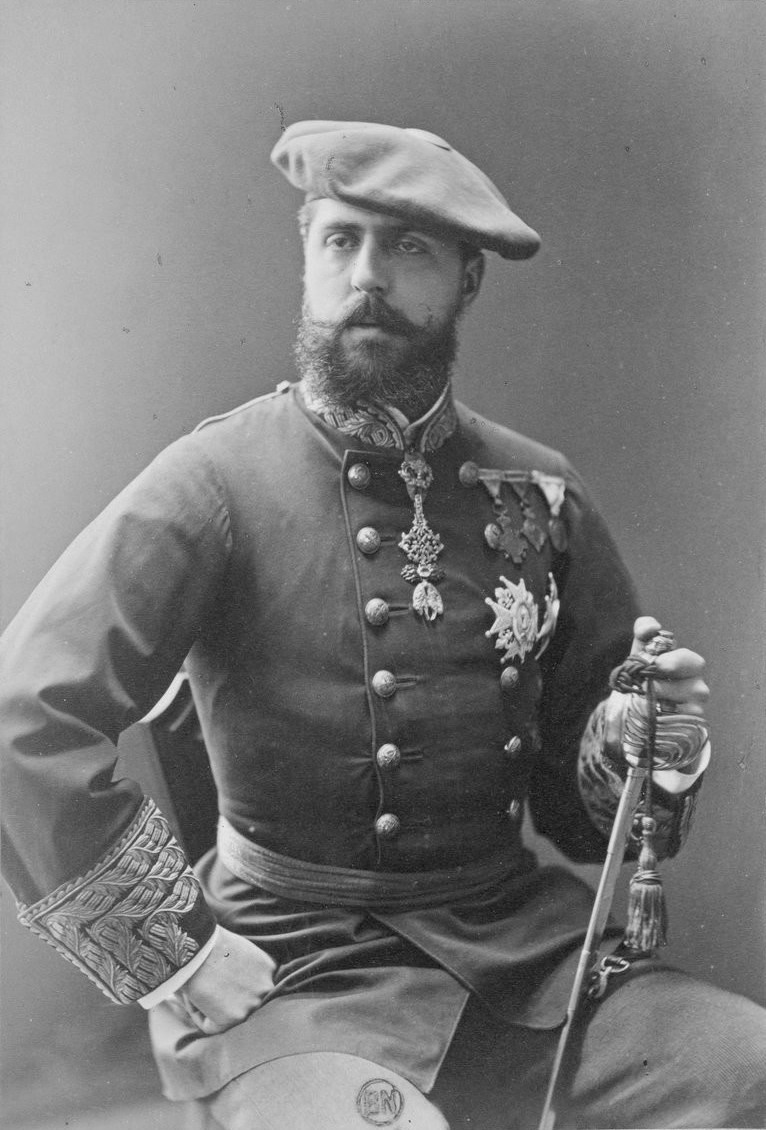
Carlos VII

Another theory seeks clarification in externalization of the Spanish case; instead of pointing to the unique Spanish character of Carlism, it highlights general European patterns of change. With ultramontanism gaining the upper hand over more conciliatory political incarnations of Catholicism after the First Vatican Council, and with the new approach made popular in the neighboring France by Louis Veuillot, the 1888 schism was nothing but a local Spanish manifestation of the trend. Defining the nascent Integrism as religious particularism striving for hegemony, this theory enjoys rather limited popularity.

Yet another approach defines both parties not as competing trends within Carlism, but as entirely separate political groupings which between 1870 and 1888 remained in a temporary, shaky alliance. According to this analysis, the religion-focused group has always been clearly distinct from Carlism. In a partisan version, reactionary Traditionalists infiltrated into popular and pre-socialist Carlism, which managed to shake the intruders off.

All the above perspectives set the stage for different interpretations of what Integrism was and how its role should be perceived. Depending on the perspective which was adopted, it can be viewed either as an offshoot branch of Carlism or as a late 19th-century incarnation of ultraconservative Spanish Catholicism or as a Spanish manifestation of a wider European phenomenon known as ultramontanism.

== Nocedal's lead, 1889–1907 ==
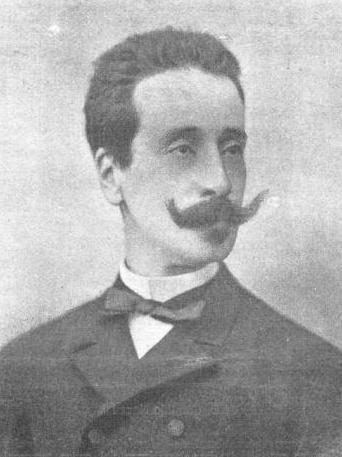
Ramón Nocedal

The nocedalista breakup did not make a huge impact among the Carlist rank-and-file, who mostly remained loyal to Carlos VII. However, many of the secessionists were counted among the top intellectuals; they were also overrepresented across the editorial boards, which resulted in an impressive array of periodicals joining the nocedalistas; in Vascongadas all Carlist titles left the claimant.

The exiled dissidents decided to build a new organization, initially to be named Partido Tradicionalista; in early 1889 it materialized as Partido Integrista Español. Though in August 1889 the party renamed itself to Partido Católico Nacional, the group was usually referred to – and also self-referred to – as Integristas. Each Spanish region was led by a junta, with their work coordinated by Junta Central. In 1893 the collegial executive was dissolved and replaced by the individual leadership of Nocedal, which clearly demonstrated his personal grip on Integrism.

Initially, the dynamics of the movement was powered mostly by mutual and extremely bitter hostility towards Carlists; occasionally the enmity even erupted into violence. In the 1880s adamant not to take part in the Restauración political system, in the 1890s the Íntegros approached elections mostly as a battlefield against Carlism, and they occasionally formed electoral alliances, even with their arch-enemies, the Liberals, if doing so would produce a Carlist defeat. The mutual relationship between the two groups started to change at the turn of the twentieth century, when local Integrist and Carlist juntas began to conclude provincial electoral deals; in the early 20th century it was not uncommon for candidates of both parties to get elected thanks to mutual support.

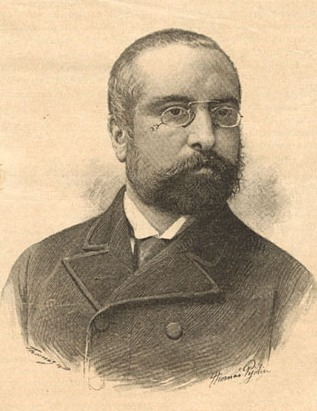
Arturo Campión

During Nocedal's leadership the Integrists were typically gaining 2 seats in the Cortes (1891, 1893, 1903, 1905), though there were campaigns with no mandates won (1896, 1899) and a very successful campaign in 1901, when they conquered 3 mandates. Although Integrism was intended as a nationwide political movement, it soon turned out that the party enjoyed material support only in the crescent ranging from Old Castile to Vascongadas, Navarre, Aragon and Catalonia. Its national stronghold turned out to be the province of Guipúzcoa and especially in the district of Azpeitia, which became sort of the Integrists' political fiefdom.

Integrism failed to materialize as a strong national party. Led by Nocedal, mainstream Integrists clung to their intransigence; refusing to reconsider the project, they thought it their moral duty to represent orthodox Christian values and confront Liberalism against all odds. Other members of the party were not so principled; because they failed to dominate the movement, it was plagued by successive defections. As early as 1893 Juan Orti y Lara and marqués de Acillona advocated reformatting the party as a looser Catholic alliance; once their proposal was rejected, they left. Soon afterwards Nocedal expulsed the group supporting Arturo Campión, another strong personality temporarily associated with Integrism. In the late 1890s Integrism suffered in its stronghold, Guipúzcoa, with dissenters taking with them the provincial El Fuerista daily. In 1899 the movement was rocked by a “Pey i Ordeix” affair and expulsion of a Jesuit priest.

== Olazábal's lead, 1907–1932 ==
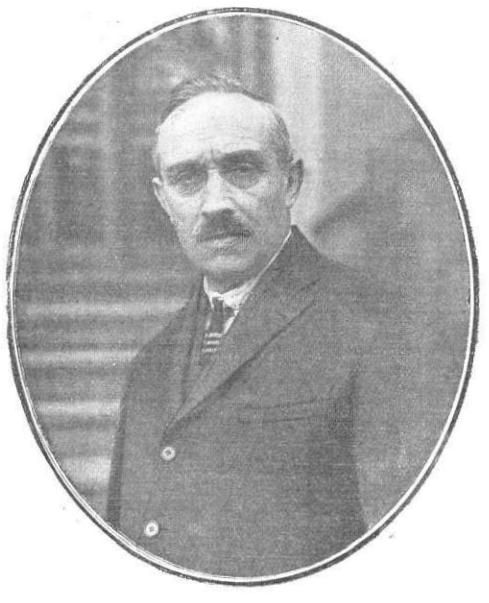
Juan Olazábal

Some contemporaries concluded that Integrism died together with Nocedal, the opinion which reflected his immense personal influence on the party but which underestimated the mobilizing potential of ultraconservative, militant Spanish Catholicism. The party leadership was assumed by a triumvirate, presided by Juan Olazábal Ramery. In 1909 he was elected the official jefe and steered faithful to the Nocedal's line, though his leadership style was somewhat different. Deprived of Nocedal's charisma, Olazábal resided in the provincial San Sebastián, away from great national politics. He did not compete for the Cortes and it was the minority parliamentarian speaker, Manuel Senante, acting as the party representative in Madrid. He also left Senante to manage El Siglo Futuro, focusing on his La Constancia and local Guipuzcoan issues. Finally, during political negotiations with other parties, at times he authorized the others to represent Partido Católico Nacional.

Despite gradually shrinking social base and continuously losing strength in 1910–1914 Integrism seemed reinvigorated, as a new breed of young Guipuzcoan activists launched its youth branch, Juventud Integrista and the party stimulated emergence of its Catholic trade unions. The movement, however, eventually did not evolve along new lines of popular mobilization and remained in its traditional formula. Though under Olazábal's guidance it initially kept winning 2 mandates in each campaign (1907, 1910, 1914), later it was reduced to a single deputy, always elected in the infallible Azpeitia (1916, 1918, 1919, 1920, 1923). The Íntegros welcomed the fall of what they perceived a rotten Liberal monarchy, but they soon lost any illusion that Primo de Rivera would lead Spain into a new Traditionalist regime. Partido Católico Nacional was forcibly dissolved and its leaders refused to take part in official primoderiverista structures. Following another wave of defections, during Dictablanda Integrism re-emerged as Comunión Tradicionalista-Integrista. It maintained local branches in almost all Spanish provinces and even recorded sort of revival in some; during last voting campaign of the monarchy, the local elections of April 1931, the Integrists won some seats in the Vasco-Navarrese area and few in Catalonia and Andalusia.

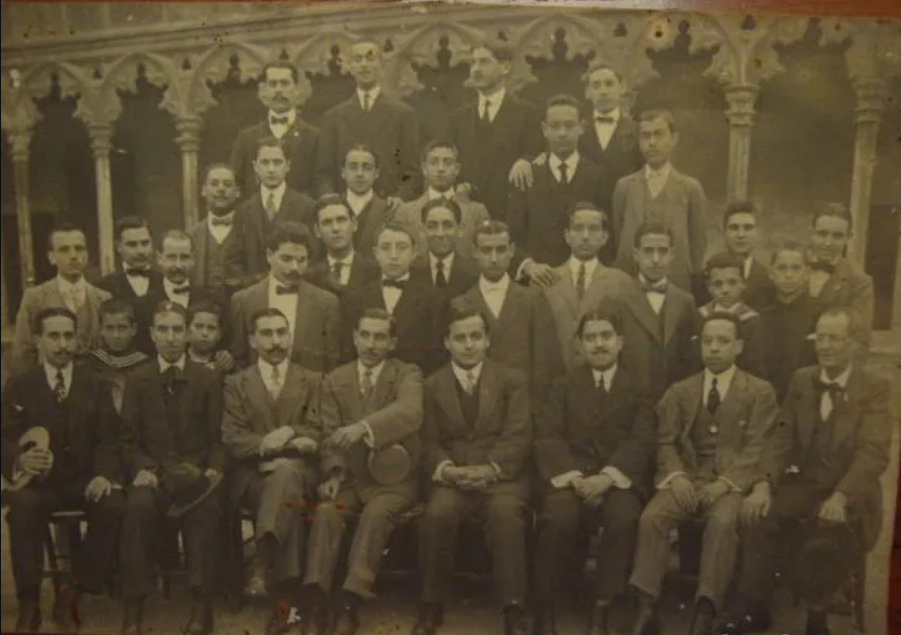
Integrists from Mallorca, 1920s

In case of the orthodox conservative Catholics the advent of the Second Spanish Republic in 1931 revealed the same political patterns as those which surfaced during the Glorious Revolution and the years of 1868–1870. Militantly secular revolutionary sway drew different ultra-Right counter-revolutionary groupings together, with their differences swept away. During the 1931 elections to Cortes Constituyentes the Integrists concluded a number of local right-wing alliances, which produced 3 mandates for candidates associated with Integrism. As the row between Integrists and various Christian-democratic groupings was already too wide, eventually the former – just like neocatólicos 62 years earlier – neared Carlism. Attracted by its similarly anti-modern, traditional and fanatical religiosity, the Íntegros decided to forget their accidentalism and in early 1932, still led by Olazábal, they joined a united Carlist organization, Comunión Tradicionalista.

== After 1932 ==
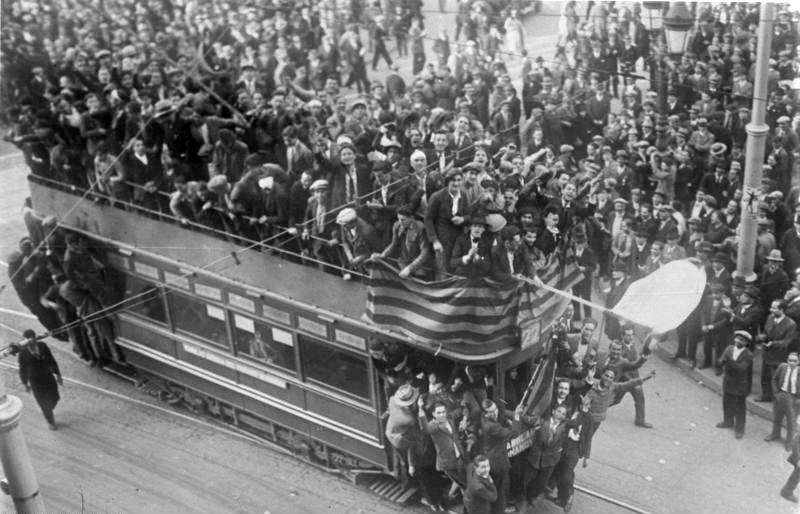
Republic declared, 1931

Though in 1932 Integrism ceased to exist as a separate political organization, former Integrists remained politically active. After 1934 they were indeed overrepresented in the Carlist executive: Manuel Fal Conde became the political leader of Carlism, José Luis Zamanillo assumed jefatura of its most dynamic, paramilitary Requeté section, José Lamamie de Clairac grew to head of the secretariat, Manuel Senante remained editor-in-chief of El Siglo Futuro, now a semi-official Carlist daily, Domingo Tejera went on to run an important Integrist Andalusian daily La Unión, and a few former Integrists entered Council of Culture, a body entrusted with dissemination of Carlist ideology. With the new claimant, Don Alfonso Carlos, known for his pro-Integrist sympathies, the former Jaimistas – especially the Navarrese – started to grumble about perceived Integrist domination within Carlism. However, unlike the neocatólicos in the 1870s, the former Íntegros did not pursue a political course on their own and amalgamated well in the overall anti-Republican Carlist strategy.

The Spanish Civil War divided Carlism along different lines, but the Integrist-Carlist divisions did not get reproduced as a pattern. In general, it remains striking that former Íntegros turned out to be the most loyal Carlists who sided with the intransigent branch standing by the regent, Don Javier. They were underrepresented among those who sought compromise with Francoism or those who sided with competitive claimants, like Don Juan or Don Carlos Pio. Most remained skeptical about the emerging Francoist regime, and some like Francisco Estévanez Rodríguez lambasted it as neo-pagan nueva Babilonia. The former Integrist, Manuel Fal Conde, kept leading mainstream Carlism until 1955, when he withdrew from politics. The last former Integrist active in the Carlist executive was José Luis Zamanillo, who until the early 1970s opposed the progressist trends within Carlism. In his bid to confront the Partido Carlista sponsored socialism, during the transición years he was joined by a mid-age generation of Carlist Traditionalist theorists associated with the review Verbo. Though Francisco Elías de Tejada and Rafael Gambra admitted allegiance to Vazquez de Mella rather than to Nocedal and Olazábal, their fundamentalist vision of religion in public life resembled the Integrist philosophy very much. Also some ultraorthodox dissenting Carlists like Maurici de Sivatte were labelled "integristas" or "carlo-integristas".

== Program ==
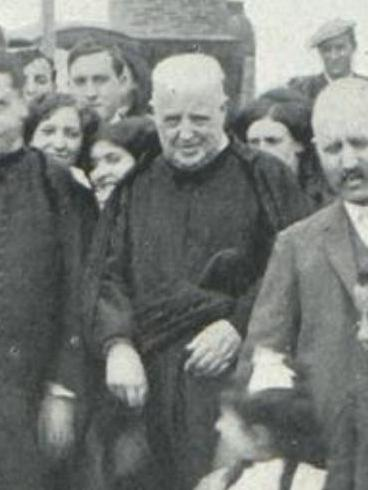
Félix Sardà y Salvany

There was no work which served as official or semi-official lecture of the Integrist doctrine; its theoretical body was laid out mostly in press articles, with the so-called Manifestación de Burgos the most frequently cited piece. The closest thing to an ideological manual was El liberalismo es pecado, a little book published in 1884 by Félix Sardà y Salvany. It was an exposition of papal teachings on Liberalism, but presented in most absolute and intransigent form. Sardá argued that since Liberalism was a sinful heresy, every Catholic was obliged to fight it; “one is not integrally Catholic unless he is integrally anti-Liberal”. The book immediately defined the group as militantly anti-Liberal movement seeking to re-introduce unity between religious and political goals.

The mediaeval Spain usually served as an inspiration; Integrism did not seek a blind transferral of past institutions, but rather an infusion of their spirit into modern structures. The party rejected Liberal constitutional monarchy and despotic absolutism alike; its ideal envisioned a king which would rule and govern, with his powers executed along and limited by the Catholic principles, as well as by traditional liberties of the social bodies making up the country. The very person of the king, however, posed a problem. Since there was no candidate and even no dynasty they supported, the Integrist monarch was increasingly turning into a theoretical being, with the movement gradually embracing monarchy without a king. In the 20th century the Integrists became even more ambiguous and some of them adopted accidentalism, prepared to accept a republican project.

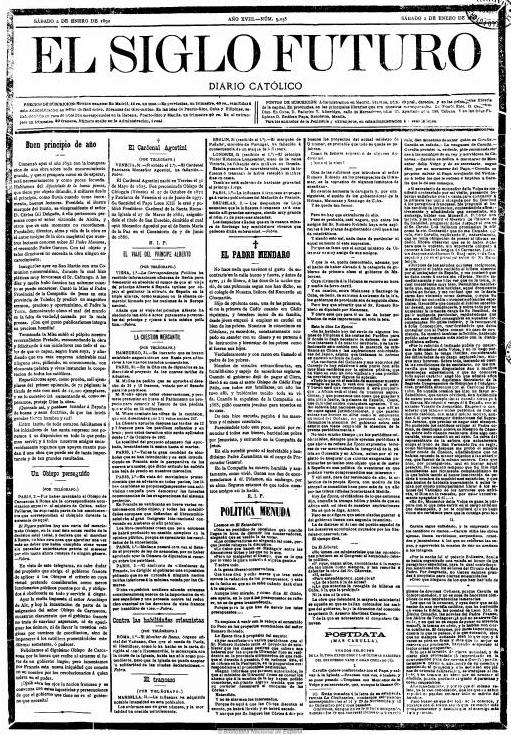
El Siglo Futuro

In terms of political representation the Integrists favored organicism; it envisioned a society as an organism composed of traditionally established components, like families, municipalities, provinces, institutions or professional corporations. Representation was to be exercised and channeled within and in-between these bodies, as opposed to representation exercised by means of popular elections; the latter, based on the Liberal preference for individuals, served only further atomization of the society. Since the Íntegros considered parliamentarian system incompatible with genuine representation, this led some scholars to conclude that they opposed universal suffrage as not democratic enough. The state itself was envisioned as a very general framework encompassing its heterogeneous components; its powers were supposed to be rather limited and necessitated only by basic practical requirements. At some point this highly regionalist vision attracted activists with pro-Basque leaning.

The Íntegros refused to recognize the social issue as such and approached it as part of the religious question. Class conflict or poverty were unavoidable results of Liberalism and could have been addressed only by rigorous application of Christian principles, exercised within the framework of organicist institutions. Socialism, though viewed as ultimate apocalyptic barbarism, was considered heir to Liberalism (and its branches, Jewry and freemasonry) and hence lesser evil between the two. Some scholars claim that social question distinguished Integrists from Carlists, lambasted for their Manifiesto de Morentin; as it contained vague references to possible future adjustment of Traditionalist doctrine, the Integrists named it treason and deviation from principles. Other scholars dismiss the Morentin issue as an ex-post invented justification for the secession.

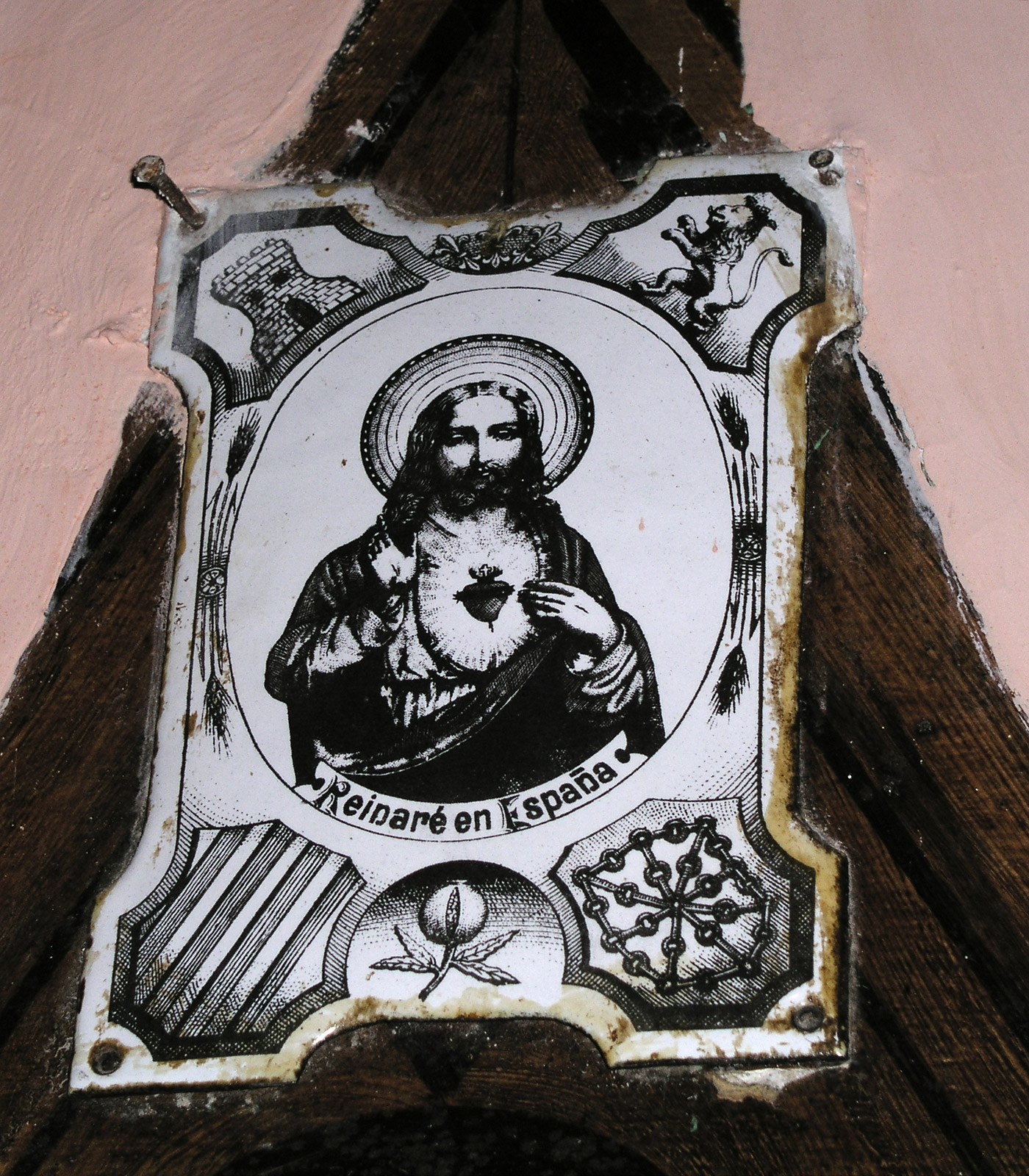
Rule over Spain, Navarrese rural house entrance emblem

During its nascent period Integrism retained a certain degree of moderation; it was only after Aparisi's death that its position began to harden considerably. Over time, as Integrism failed to materialize as first-rate political force and gradually formatted itself as a party of protest, politically located at the sidelines of the system, in the practical order its cause became hopeless. This resulted – apart from successive waves of defections – in growing inexorability, as the party could have easily afforded the luxury of intransigence. Some scholars note that its program gradually evolved towards mysticism, with more focus on “the reign of Jesus Christ” than on practical considerations of daily politics. The Integrist propaganda at times revealed a millenarian tone, claiming that the day of reckoning is necessary before a genuine Catholic Spain would be reborn.

Analysis of the Integrist political philosophy is based on theoretical works; how it would have translated into praxis remains nothing but a speculation. Electoral campaigns provide evidence that practical considerations had some moderating effect on the Integrist outlook, as local juntas not infrequently closed deals even with parties at the other end of political spectrum. There are almost no studies which focus on municipalities governed by the Íntegros. Single and not necessarily representative cases of Integrist politicians holding positions of power suggest that they were very down-to-earth administrators; Juan Olazábal as member of the Gipuzkoan Diputación Provincial dedicated himself to issues like maintaining regional cattle breeds, developing local agricultural education and supervising veterinary services; he is praised for promoting experts against dogmatic politicians.

== Integrism and the Church ==
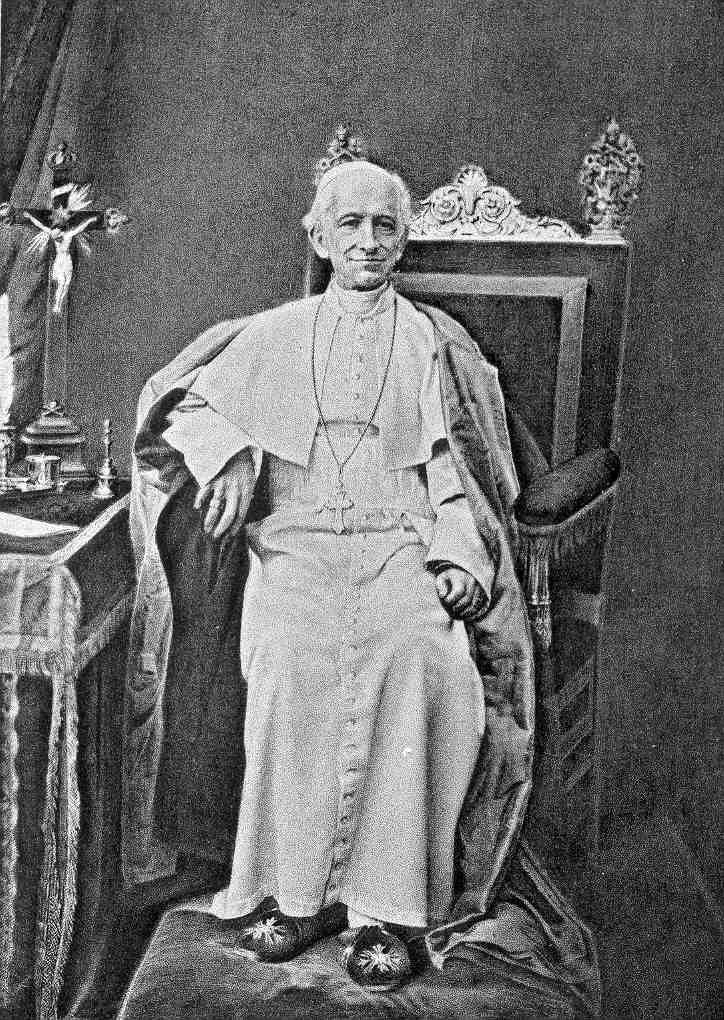
Leo XIII

Though the Integrists strove to be most loyal sons of the Church, their relations with the hierarchy remained thorny from the very beginning. When Traditionalists led by Pidal accepted the Conservatives’ Restauración project as a “hypothesis” and assumed that party politics should not stand in the way of Catholic unity, this line received the Rome's blessing in 1881. Future Integrists vehemently opposed the Pidalists and advanced their own interpretation of papal teaching, claiming that those who embraced the Liberal principle of religious tolerance excluded themselves from the Church and did not merit the benefit of moderation. As a result, once the Vatican realized the politically charged nature of the planned 1882 pilgrimage, Leo XIII withdrew his blessing and the project had to be abandoned. The gap between two Catholic strategies became evident and occasionally led to violence, like in Seville in 1882.

Conciliatory position of the Holy See during a mid-1880s crisis versus the Cánovas government alienated the belligerent Íntegros further on; with Ramón Nocedal explaining in public what rights the bishops were entitled to exercise and Francisco Mateos Gago accusing them of laicism, the conflict soon involved papal nuncio. When Liberalismo es pecado was initially approved by the papal Congregation of the Index the Íntegros declared their triumph; at this point Vatican backtracked and noted that while doctrinally correct, the work was not necessarily valid as political guidance, a reservation which undermined the key message of the book. Though the conflicts kept mushrooming over many issues, as evidenced by the Fuerista controversy in the early 1890s, the bottom line was that the Church was careful to stay on good terms with all governments, while Integrism was assuming an increasingly anti-establishment format.

The Integrist doctrine has divided the Spanish priesthood. While most hierarchs supported the idea of Catholic unity as a catchword for conciliatory approach towards the Restoration regime, intransigence was rife amongst the lower clergy and some scholars, with incidents of bishops closing the seminaries and dismissing professors and seminarians alike. Only few nationally recognizable personalities of the Church, like Sardá y Salvany or José Roca y Ponsa openly sympathised with the Integrists. Most Spanish religious orders demonstrated at least a grade of sympathy; despite growing controversies, the Jesuits backed Integrism openly. From 1892 onwards the order started – initially erratically – to scale down their support. The final blow came in 1905, when Compañía de Jesus embraced the lesser evil principle. Inter Catolicos Hispaniae (1906) gave papal approval to the Jesuit line and left Nocedal personally shattered. Olazábal turned on the Jesuits when waging war against Gonzalo Coloma, the campaign which lasted until 1913.

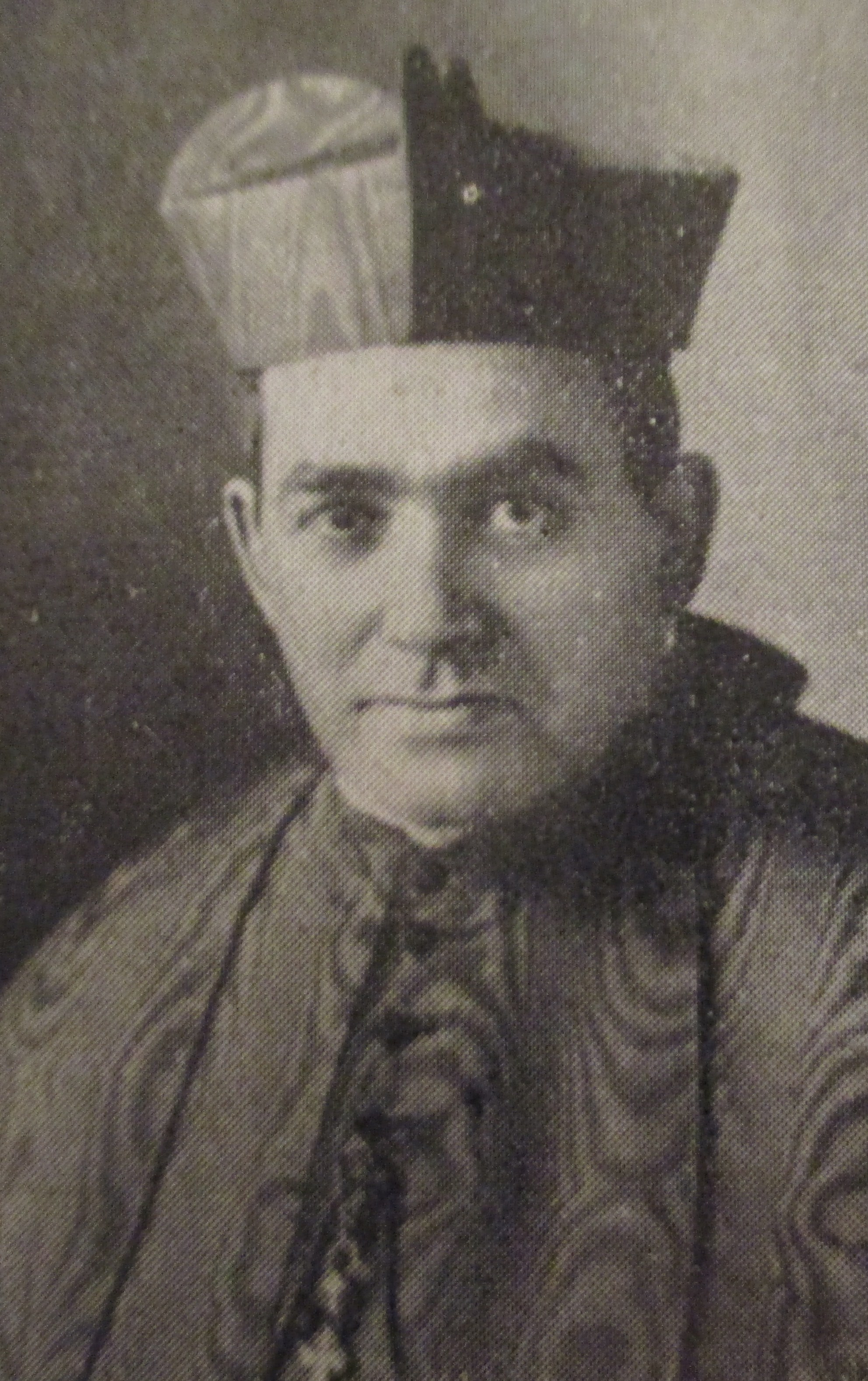
Primate Segura

Around 1900 the Spanish hierarchy started to abandon their traditional strategy of influencing key individuals within the liberal monarchy and began to switch to mass mobilization, carried by means of broad popular structures and party politics. The Integrists, as usual reluctant to be one of many Catholic parties, despised the semi-democratic format of policy-making and refused to accept malmenorismo; as a result, in the 1910s and 1920s Partido Católico Nacional was dramatically outpaced by new breed of modern Christian-democratic organizations. In 1919 Integrists commenced war against a new trend, the emerging social-Catholicism, targeting syndical thought of Arboleya, Gafo and López-Dóriga; the conflict continued until the late 1920s. The official position of the hierarchy changed slightly in favor of Integrism in 1927, once Pedro Segura became the Primate. His voice on Christian syndicalism and his vision of integral re-Christianization resembled a typical Integrist concept rather than accidentalist and possibilist strategy. Cordial relations between Segura and some Integrists, especially Senante, continued until the late 1950s.

== Legacy ==
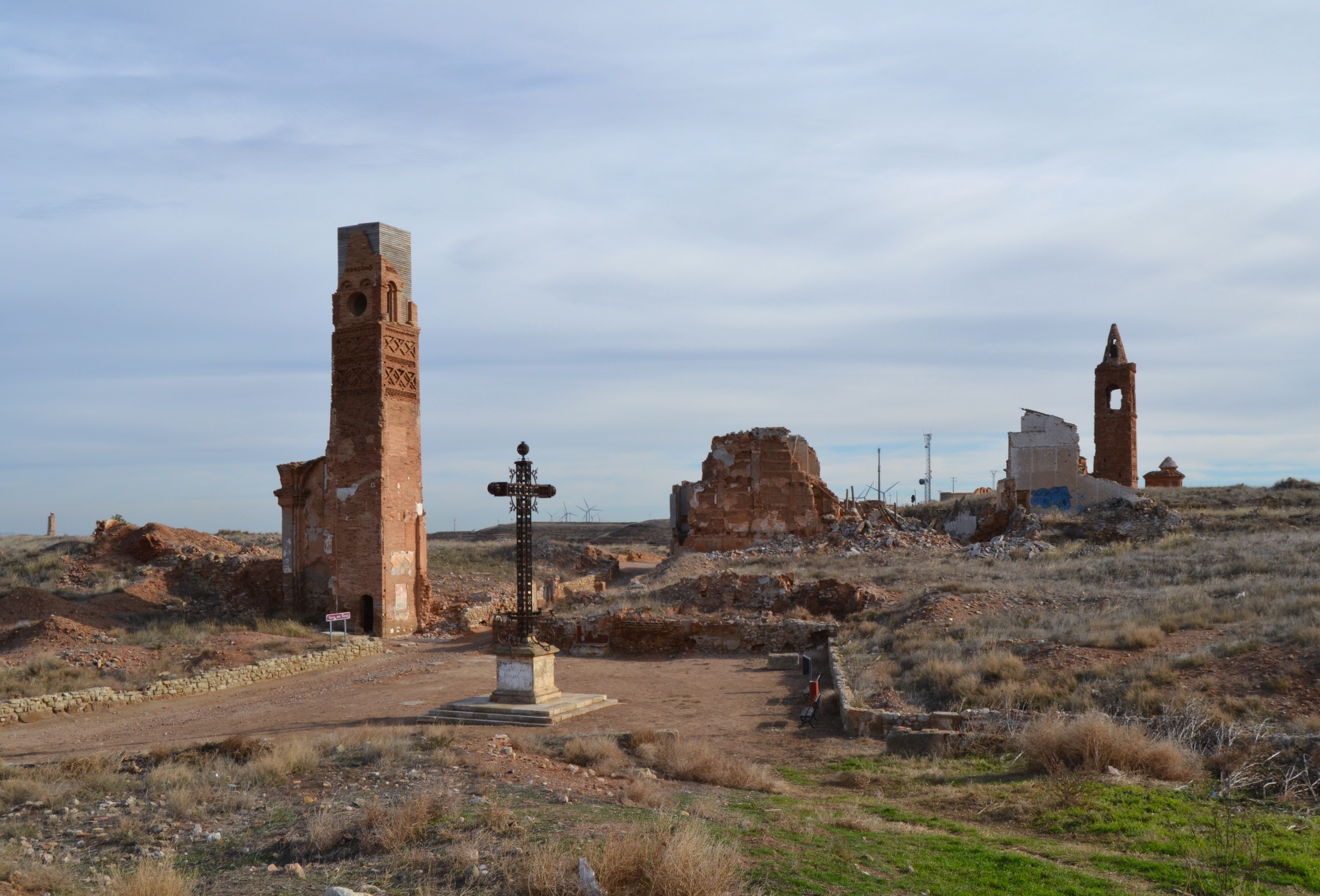
old Belchite

No matter whether Spanish Integrism is categorized as an offshoot branch of Carlism, a phase in history of Spanish militant political Catholicism or local manifestation of European ultramontanism, it is usually firmly classified as antidemocratic reactionary trend which ventured to prevent modernization of Spain. There are some exceptions, though; few scholars underline that the Integrists confronted the corrupted Restoration system by advancing democratic claims. Its actual impact on history of the country remains disputed. Some scholars claim that Integrism constituted a marginal phenomenon, anachronistic already when it emerged; though it was testimonial to some debates within Spanish Catholicism, it soon disappeared on the ash heap of history. Some students claim that the Integrist intransigence and their insistence on the annihilation of the opposition hardened ideological divisions, fuelled aggressive political militancy and contributed to sectarian politics of the 1930s. Despite vehemently anti-Francoist stand of key former Integrists, there are authors who maintain that Integrism enjoyed its triumph in the Francoist Spain; they point out that the regime was founded on national re-Christianisation concept of "reconquista" and "cruzada", nacionalcatolicismo gained upper hand over syndicalist falangism and the 1953 concordat was “reproducción de ideal integrista”.

The Integrist role in history of the Church is also subject to different and indeed contradictory conclusions. Some scholars see Integrismo as a product of wider Catholic trend that emerged in Europe in the 1870s, in the aftermath of the First Vatican Council. Other students claim exactly the opposite, namely that it was the Spanish Integrism which assumed a universal shape as an anti-modernist campaign, promoted by Pius X in the 1900s; most of the measures adopted by the pope allegedly stemmed from the Integrist proposal. The official Catholic historiography presents Integrism in rather ambivalent terms. The movement is credited for confronting excess Liberalism and for revindicating autonomy of the lay, but criticized for merging religion and politics, arrogant intransigence and dividing the Catholics. On the overall basis the Spanish Integrism is described as counter-productive, weakening rather than strengthening the Spanish Church. When viewed as part of a wider phenomenon Integrism is usually approached as tantamount to fundamentalism or fanaticism; the name is sometimes applied as abuse or insult, also by the progressive Roman Catholic theorists.

== See also ==
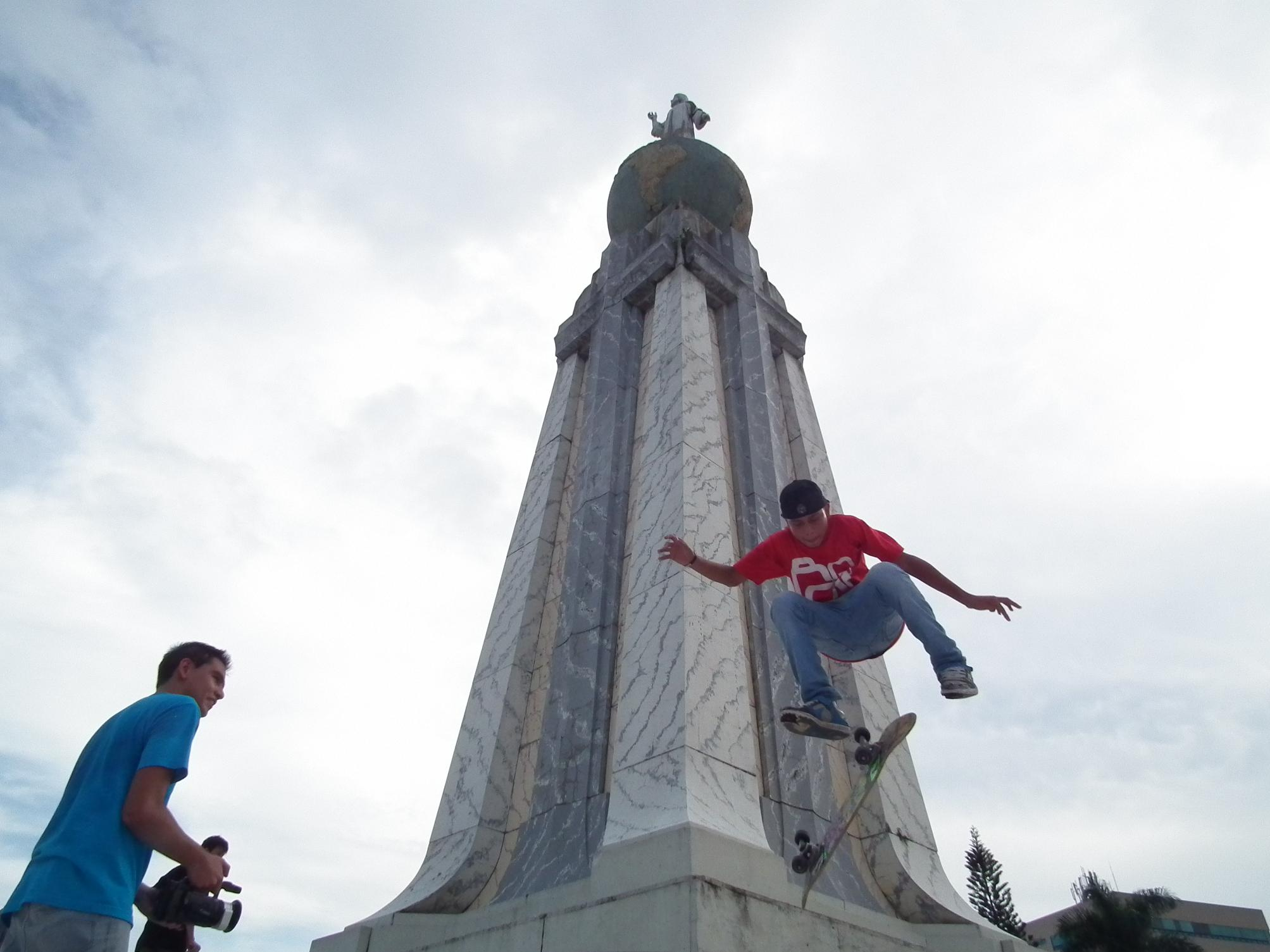
Christ saves the world, S. Salvador

- Integrism
- Neocatólicos
- Carlism
- Ultramontanism
- Partido Católico Nacional
- Electoral Carlism (Restoration)
- El Siglo Futuro
- La Constancia
- Ramón Nocedal Romea
- Juan Olazábal Ramery
- Manuel Senante Martinez
- José Sánchez Marco
- Félix Sardà y Salvany
