= Neocatólicos =

19th-century Spanish conservative political movement

The neocatólicos ("neo–Catholics", shorted to neos) was a counter-revolutionary political tradition, faction or movement in late 19th-century Spain, emerged during the reign of Isabella II, akin to "Isabelline traditionalism" and "authoritarian conservatism", fusing anti-liberalism with the defence of the queen's dynastic legitimacy.

Part of the 19th century Spanish counter-revolutionary though, and described as the "extreme right of the Moderate Party that had in Donoso Cortés their father and inspirator", the political struggle of the neos, already coalesced by 1860, sided them with Carlism against the liberal advances and republicanism.

After the 1868 Glorious Revolution (and overthrow of Isabella II) they tended to join the ranks of Carlism. Later in the 19th century, during the Restoration, politicians with a neo-Catholic background would enjoy, unlike old Carlists, some presence in the Conservative cabinets. By 1888 many of them helped to form the Integrist Party.

Neos often denounced Krausists, deriding them as "Pantheists" and "anti-Catholics".

Some neo-Catholic representatives include Cándido Nocedal, Antonio Aparisi y Guijarro, Gabino Tejado, Eduardo González Pedroso and Ortí y Lara.
