= El Siglo Futuro =

Spanish newspaper (1875–1936)

El Siglo Futuro was a Spanish traditionalist and integrist daily newspaper, published in Madrid between 1875 and 1936.

== Organisational history ==
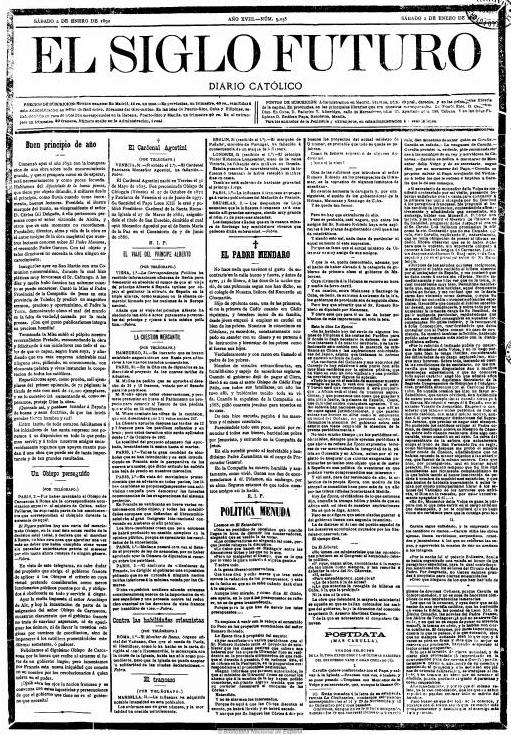
El Siglo Futuro, 1892

It was founded by the Carlist politician and thinker Cándido Nocedal; the first issue came out on March 19, 1875. As the Carlists suffered a crushing defeat in the Third Carlist War, the initiative was supposed to shift focus to the long-term perspective of the literary war. The new newspaper was to disseminate the Carlist thought using the highest analytical and erudite standards. Following the death of its founder in 1885, the newspaper was taken over by his son, Ramón Nocedal. In 1889 El Siglo Futuro departed from the mainstream Traditionalism as Nocedal and his followers set up Partido Católico Nacional, a breakaway group usually referred to as the Integrists. After the death of Nocedal in 1907 the newspaper was inherited by his successor at the helm of the group, Juan Olazábal, while Manuel Senante became the editor-in-chief. In 1932, as the Integrists re-united with the mainstream Carlism, the daily followed suit. In 1935 it was fully incorporated into the Carlist propaganda machinery. Following the outbreak of the Civil War it was last issued on July 18, 1936; soon afterwards its premises were ransacked by the anarchists.

== Key threads ==
The principal objective of El Siglo Futuro remained the defence of Catholic faith and position of the Church in Spain. Ultraconservative, its primary foe was liberalism, later to be paired with - viewed as more radical but somewhat lesser evils - democracy and socialism. The paper propagated the theories of Leo XIII and his successors, advocating a new social and political vision of a modern Catholic state. The daily remained strongly monarchical, though with less clearly defined dynastic allegiances. Disseminated what it perceived traditional Spanish values.

In the 20th century the paper led the venomous campaign against the Jews and the freemasonry, claiming that Judaism is the head and the Freemasonry is the arms of the satanic monster; the Jews were alternately accused of alliance with the Russian Bolshevism or with the capitalist plutocracy. In 1930s El Siglo was a fairly typical Spanish party paper, excelling in bombastic, hyperbolical, inflammatory, intransigent, sectarian phraseology – very much like the republican or socialist press, let alone the anarchist or communist papers. The official Spanish digital archive describes the late daily as fanatically fundamentalist, consumed by apocalyptic obsession and dubbed a caveman.

== Contemporary issues ==
El Siglo Futuro pronounced on the issues faced by Spain of its time. It fought the Alfonsist reinstatement, opposed militantly secular liberalism of the late Restauración era, sided with the Conservative Party against the modernizing designs of late 19th century, followed the 1898 disaster in the war against the United States, cautiously endorsed Catalan and Basque rights if framed in the traditional fueros, sympathized with the Central Powers in course of the First World War, despised the emerging anarchist and Spanish Socialist Workers' Party, cheered the Primo de Rivera dictatorship to be disillusioned later, had few regrets about the fallen monarchy of Alfonso XIII but was almost explicitly hostile towards the Republic, welcomed the rise of Benito Mussolini and Adolf Hitler, to turn against the latter following the assassination of Engelbert Dollfuss.

== Continuity and change ==
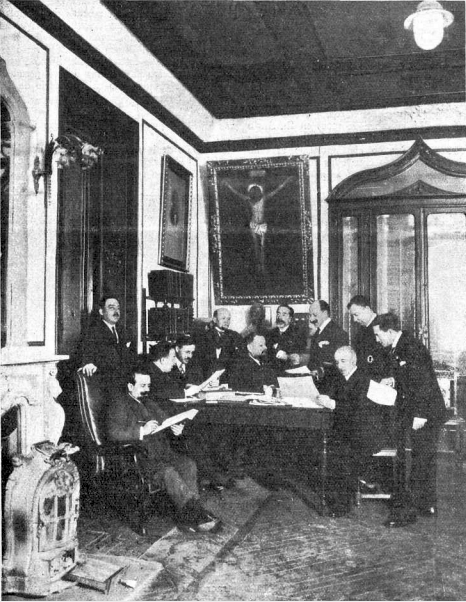
El Siglo Futuro Executive Board, 1925

Throughout its lifetime El Siglo Futuro remained an ultraconservative, vehemently antiliberal and then fiercely antidemocratic vehicle of pursuing traditional values centered on the Catholic faith. The competitive position of the newspaper remained fairly stable, trailing far behind the mainstream dailies. On the Spanish national press market of the 20th century it maintained a circulation of 5,000, compared to 200,000 of the monarchist ABC or 80,000 of the Christian El Debate in the late 1930s. The readership base remained mostly the same, composed of parish clergy and Traditionalist activists. The layout and design evolved. Initially it was composed of six pages seven columns each. Over the years, editorial segment was expanded with economic, sports and culture sections added. In 1920s El Siglo Futuro started to include photography and cartoons, to change the design dramatically in 1935 and increasing to 32 pages.

== Comparison to other Carlist dailies ==
There were many Traditionalist newspapers issued all over Spain throughout late 19th and early 20th century, though most of them short-lived and local. It is estimated that during the 1930s out of ca 300 dailies published across the country around 10% were Carlist, though only few gained some prominence. Compared to them, El Siglo Futuro was almost equaled in terms of circulation by the Barcelona-based El Correo Catalán of Miguel Junyent and the Sevilla-based La Unión of Domingo Tejera, trailed by the smaller Pamplona-based El Pensamiento Navarro and the Vitoria-based El Pensamiento Álaves, both ca 3,000-4,000 copies each. Dynastical issues usually remained of lesser importance to El Siglo Futuro. The paper presented a somewhat broader perspective, dedicating more space to foreign affairs; other Carlist titles remained focused mostly on the national, if not purely regional issues. It was not attached to the traditional, Navarrese leadership of the Carlist movement and was the first to hail Manuel Fal Conde as the new head. El Siglo Futuro was definitely less news-dependent, with editorials remaining frequent pieces. Finally, the geographical coverage and the readers’ base was visibly broader; as a Madrid daily it was reaching national decision-makers with more ease. In terms of prestige within the Carlist community only El Pensamiento Navarro could have compared to El Siglo Futuro.

== Last years ==
Following the merger with mainstream Carlism in 1932 the paper became a semi-official organ of Comunión Tradicionalista. Its ownership passed from the Olazábal circle to the Editorial Tradicionalista company (headed by Conde Rodezno), which was in turn controlled by the Delegación Especial de Prensa (headed by Manuel González Quevedo). In 1935 Senante lost his overwhelming influence on the paper line; thanks to the party funds El Siglo Futuro was dramatically enhanced, but at a price of forming part of the centralised and modernised Carlist press system. The daily had to follow strict discipline, publishing official material and giving approved treatment to most public issues. If El Siglo Futuro retained its Integrist core it was only because the ex-Integrist Manuel Fal Conde was heading the Carlist movement at that time and former Integrists like Senante or Ruiz Muñoz remained key personalities in the editorial board. In fact, El Siglo Futuro was one of the principal means allowing the ex-Integrists to occupy central position in the Carlist movement. Upon the outbreak of the Civil War the Madrid premises of the newspaper were ransacked and taken over by the anarchist militiamen. During the war the title was not re-created elsewhere in the Nationalist zone. Afterwards Senante was allegedly considering resuming his opus magnum, but afraid that it would be incorporated into the francoist propaganda machine he hesitated until finally abandoning the idea.
