= Juan Olazábal Ramery =

Spanish Traditionalist politician

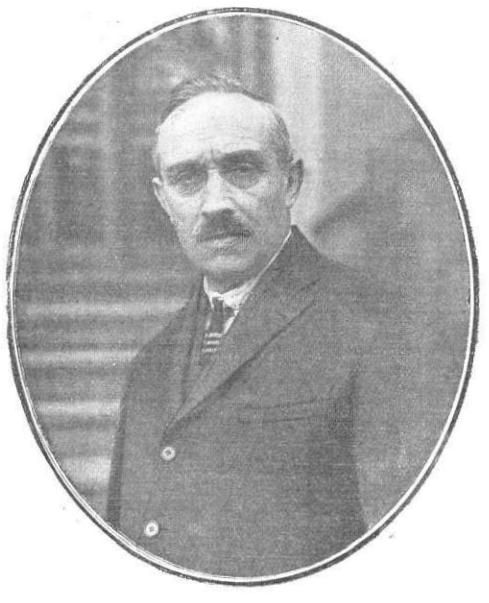
- Born: Juan Olazábal Ramery; 1863; Irún, Spain
- Died: 1937 (aged 73–74); Bilbao, Spain
- Occupation: journalist
- Known for: Politician
- Political party: Partido Católico Nacional, Comunión Tradicionalista-Integrista, Comunión Tradicionalista

Juan Olazábal Ramery (1863–1937) was a Spanish Traditionalist politician, first as a Carlist, then as an Integrist, and eventually back in the Carlist ranks. In 1899-1901 he served in the Cortes, and in 1911-1914 he was a member of the Gipuzkoan diputación provincial. Between 1897 and 1936 he managed and edited the San Sebastián daily La Constancia. He is best known as the nationwide leader of Integrism, the grouping he led between 1907 and 1931.

== Family and youth ==
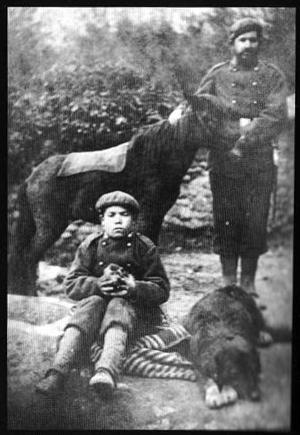
1872: a Carlist, a boy, a pottok and a dog

Juan José Tomás Ramón María Melitón Santiago Olazábal Ramery was born to a very distinguished Gipuzkoan dynasty, much branched and intermarried with a number of other well known local families. His father, Juan Antonio Olazábal Arteaga, held a number of estates in Eastern part of the province. Following his early death in 1867, Juan and his siblings were raised by their mother, Prudencia Ramery Zuzuarregui. At the outbreak of the Third Carlist War the family sought refuge in France. Following their return to Spain Juan was educated in the Jesuit college in Orduña, where he met and befriended Sabino Arana, to proceed with law studies in another Jesuit institute, Colegio del Pasaxe in the Galician A Guarda. He then moved to Universidad Central in Madrid, to graduate in 1885.

Though the family in some sources is described as Carlist, in fact its different branches adhered to different political options. Juan's paternal uncle, Ramón Olazábal Arteaga, as coronel of miqueletes sided with the Isabelinos during the Third Carlist War, growing to the commander of the entire formation and also the civil governor of Irun. On the other hand, Juan's maternal uncle, Liborio Ramery Zuzuarregui, made his name as a Carlist politician, Gipzukoan deputy to the Cortes and a Traditionalist writer. A distant relative from a paternal branch, Tirso de Olazábal y Lardizábal, became head of Gipuzkoan Carlism and one of the national party leaders. It was rather the influence of Juan's maternal family, especially Liborio, which combined with the Jesuit education formed him as a Carlist. Juan Olazábal has never married and had no children. Some members of the Olazábal family were active as Carlist politicians in the early Francoist era, though they were very distant Juan's relatives.

== Early career ==
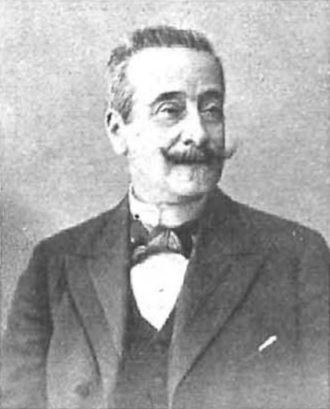
Ramón Nocedal

Already as a student Olazábal engaged in public activity taking part in Carlist-sponsored Catholic initiatives, e.g. protests against krausism-flavored heterodoxy in education or against promotion of figures like Giordano Bruno; instead, he advocated Catholic orthodoxy as fundament of public education in Spain. In 1888 both Olazábal Ramery brothers, Juan and Javier, defected from mainstream Carlism and joined its breakaway branch led by Ramón Nocedal, known as Integrism; they followed the example of their uncle Liborio, who entered the Integrist executive as secretario of junta central. In 1889 they were already active in various minor Integrist public initiatives. Juan returned to Gipuzkoa, building the party structures and mobilising its popular support in the province, which soon turned out to be a national Integrist stronghold. In the 1891 elections the party gained 2 mandates in the province, one conquered by Juan's uncle Liborio and one by the party leader Nocedal. Since at that time Integrism and mainstream Carlism competed with vehement hostility, the latter success looked triumphant: Nocedal defeated the Gipuzkoan mainstream Carlist leader, Tirso Olazábal. Nocedal was also re-elected in the subsequent elections of 1893.

Following the death of Liborio Ramery in 1894, Juan Olazábal took his place in provincial party leadership. The same year he was already representing the province at national party gatherings, hosting party meetings at his Mundaiz estate in 1895 and formally growing to segundo adjunto of the Gipuzkoan branch in 1896. He was engaged in negotiations with other parties during local electoral campaigns. An alliance with the conservatives, known as Union Vasconavarra, produced 3 Integrist mandates into the San Sebastian ayuntamiento in 1893; the same coalition produced the same outcome in 1895, this time Olazábal elected as concejal. He made himself renowned for defending traditional local establishments against the centralising and modernising designs of the Madrid government. In 1896 he was forced to resign after a failed attempt to block ministerial legislation he considered detrimental to the interests of the city, but was reinstated following a successful appeal and served until 1899.

== La Constancia ==
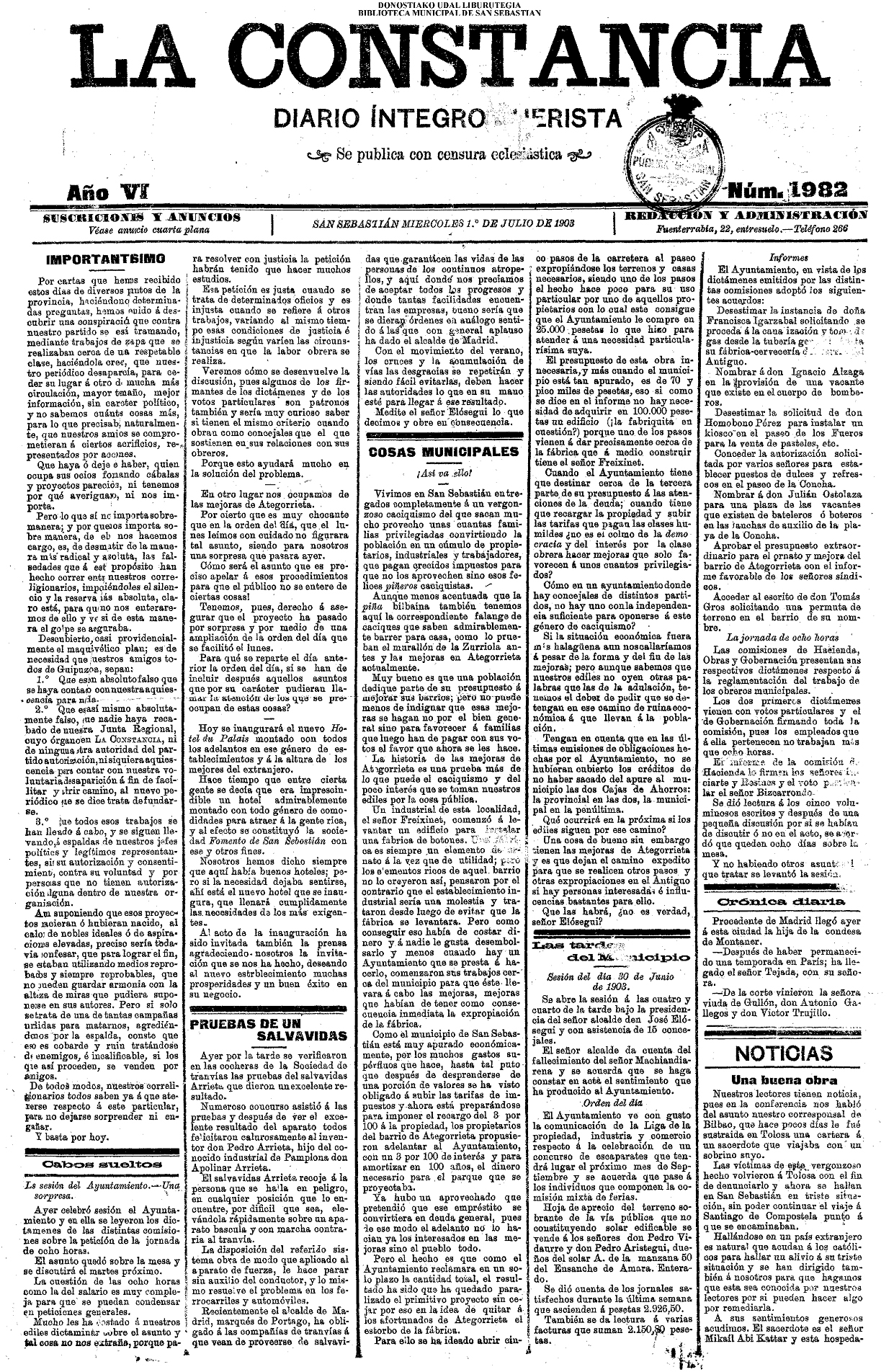
La Constancia, 1903

In the late 1890s the Gipuzkoan Integrism underwent a major crisis, though its nature remains disputed. One theory highlights the alliance strategy; Nocedal changed his recommendations, suggesting coalitions with parties offering the best deal instead of the most approximate ones. Another theory attributes the conflict to nationalist penchant of the dissenters. As they refused to step in line, the rebels, headed by Pedro Grijalba, Ignacio Lardizábal and Aniceto de Rezola, were expulsed by the provincial Junta. Since the outcasts controlled a provincial Gipuzkoan Integrist daily El Fuerista, Olazábal was asked to compensate for the loss; in 1897 he set up a new party newspaper, the San Sebastian-based La Constancia; initially it appeared with a sub-title Diario Integro Fuerista, later changed to Diario Integrista, Diario Integro-Tradicionalista and finally, Diario Tradicionalista. His personal property, it was published until 1936 and, apart from being an official paper of Gipuzkoan Integrism for 34 years, until the end it remained sort of Olazábal's personal political and ideological tribune.

Named after a Nocedalist daily of 1867–68, La Constancia was one of 4 dailies published in Gipuzkoa and one of 14 periodicals controlled by the Integrists in Spain. It remained a modest enterprise, with 2 journalists and 3 permanent collaborators. Its circulation remained unimpressive; in 1920 it was 1,650 copies, compared to 12,000 of the leading Gipuzkoan dailies, La Voz de Gipuzkoa and El Pueblo Vasco, though still above this of an Integrist daily from neighboring Navarre, which went out of print in some 850-1000 copies. Given a semi-private nature of the paper, there is little doubt its longevity was sustained financially by industrial tycoons of Integrist sympathies. Over the years it gradually became an icon of Traditionalist Spanish press. La Constancia combined traditionalist Catholic ultraconservatism launched as Integrism by Nocedal with the defence of local Gipuzkoan identity and loyalty. During the Republican years it was subject to suspensions and other administrative measures. In the early 1930s it was integrated into the modern Carlist propaganda machinery and Olazabal ceded its directorship to Francisco Juaristi:; since 1934 it included one page in Basque. After the outbreak of the Civil War its premises were seized by the Republican militias. Once the Carlists conquered San Sebastian its linotype machines were used to launch La Voz de Espańa, which employed also some of the La Constancia's editorial staff.

== Deputy ==
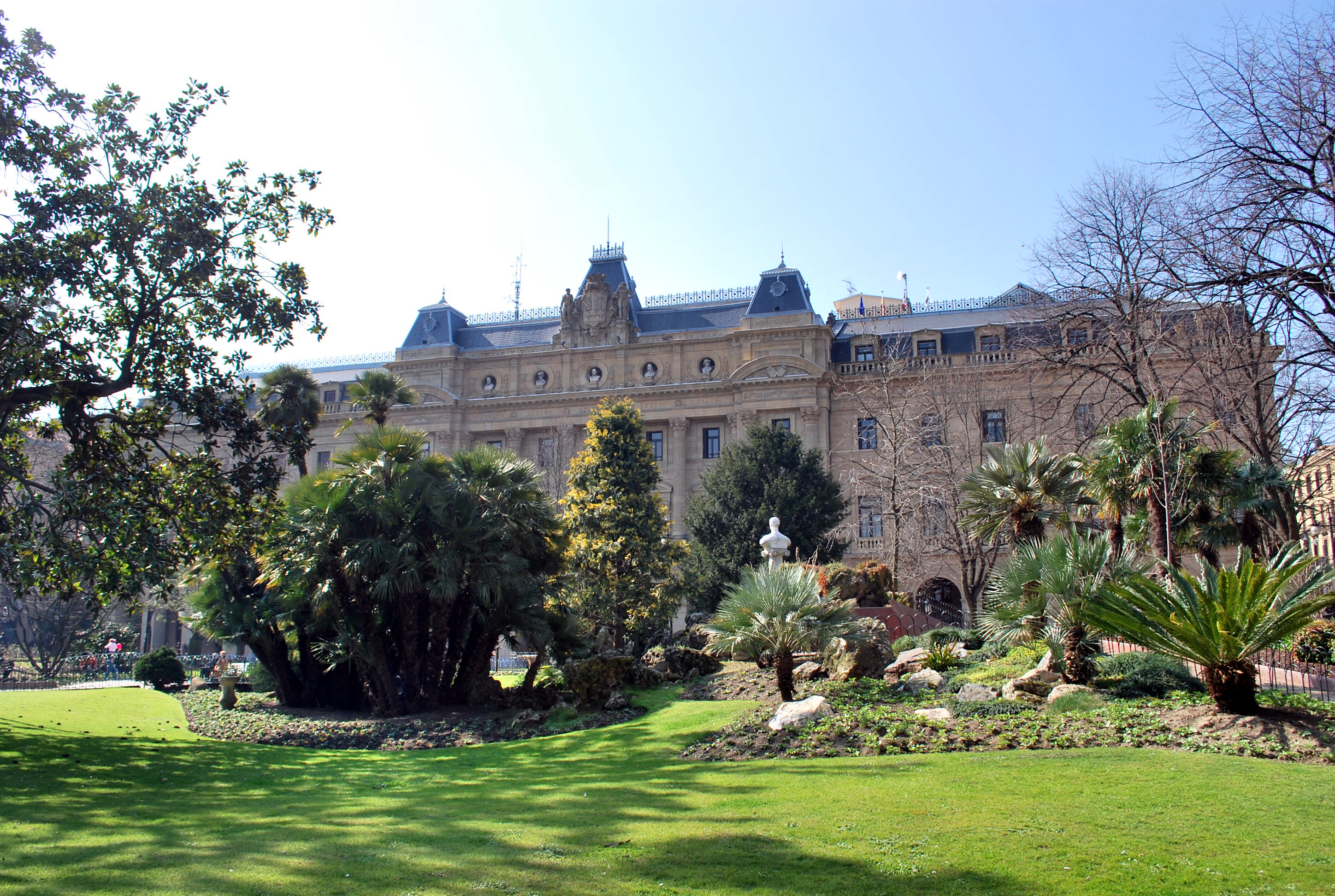
Diputacion Foral building

In the last years of the 19th century venomous hostility between Integrists and mainstream Carlists gave way to rapprochement, commenced in Gipuzkoa. Its result was a provincial electoral alliance. In Azpeitia, where two branches of Traditionalism used to compete, the Carlist candidate Teodoro Arana Belaustegui was withdrawn in favour of the Integrists. Their candidate turned out to be Olazábal, elected also by Carlist votes to the Cortes. The years of 1899-1901 were his only term in the parliament; during the successive elections the Azpeitia mandate – virtually ensured for the party – was claimed by other Integrist politicians.

For reasons which remain rather unclear in the early 20th century Olazábal abandoned national politics and dedicated himself to the local Gipuzkoan issues. In 1904-1906 he engaged in a broad coalition named Liga Foral Autonomista de Guipúzcoa and became its second vicepresident. The alliance declared itself dedicated to traditional provincial fueros and identified fiscal and administrative autonomy as its goals. Its immediate objective was negotiating a new Concierto económico with Madrid and indeed, a contemporary scholar considers the grouping simply a vehicle for pursuing economic goals of local industry tycoons.

Broad and loose political rapprochement of Gipuzkoan parties pursuing regionalist goals produced Olazábal's success in elections to Diputación Provincial in 1907 and 1911, in 1914 serving as member of its Comisión Provincial. He is noted not only for work promoting traditional local legal establishments, but also for efforts to sustain typical Gipuzkoan agriculture, like protecting Pyrenaic cattle breeds by means of introducing herdbooks, supporting the Fraisoro agronomy school and supervising provincial veterinary services. Though lacking technical knowledge and somewhat incapacitated by a framework of political alliances, he nevertheless tried to promote the experts against incompetence of the politicians.

== Jefe ==
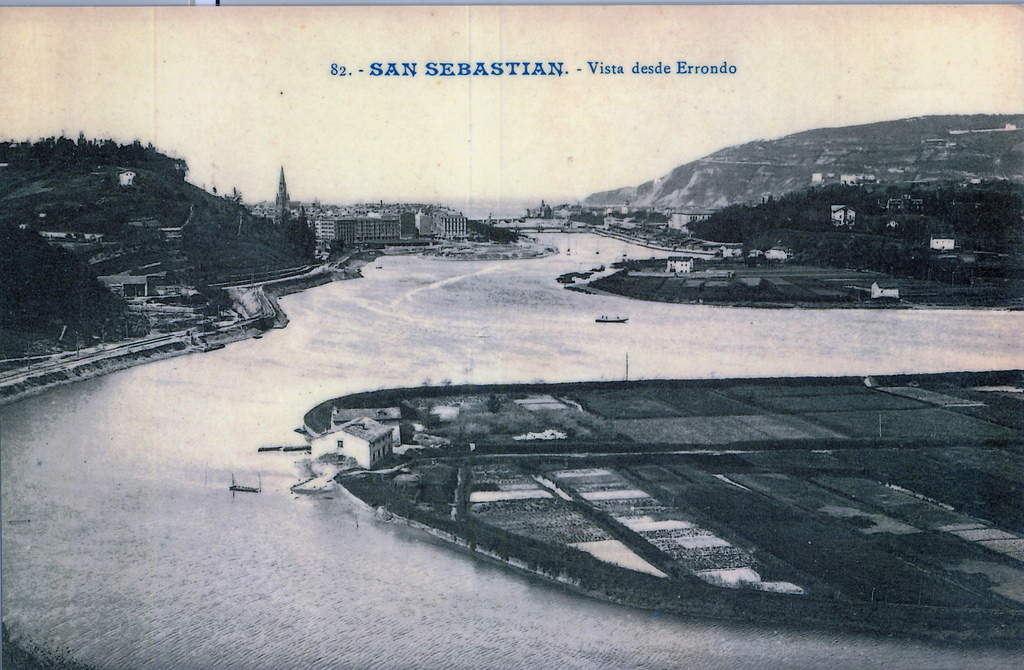
San Sebastian, early 20th century

In the early 20th century Olazábal emerged as one of key Integrist politicians. His position was ensured as since the death of Ramón Zavala Salazar in 1899 he was heading the party in its national stronghold. Following the death of Ramón Nocedal early 1907, leadership of the Integrist organization, Partido Católico Nacional, was assumed by a triumvirate, though few months later Olazábal became Presidente del Consejo. In 1909 he was elected the official party leader, also nominated honorary president of a number of local Integrist juntas.

Olazábal's leadership style was rather unobtrusive. Residing in San Sebastian he was away from great national politics; he did not compete for the Cortes and it was minority parliamentarian speaker, Manuel Senante, acting as party representative in Madrid. Though formally the owner of national Integrist daily, El Siglo Futuro, he left Senante to manage the newspaper and seldom contributed as an author, concentrating rather on La Constancia. Finally, during political negotiations with other parties, he authorised the others to represent Partido Católico Nacional.

In terms of political course Olazábal followed Nocedal closely. The fundamental assumption was that all public activity should be guided by Catholic principles and executed in line with the Roman Catholic teaching. In day-to-day activities it boiled down to opposing secularisation and defending the Church, as demonstrated during Ley de Candado crisis. Secondary threads were promoting traditional regional establishments and fighting democracy, especially parties combining nationalism and socialism. Towards the monarchy Integrism remained ambiguous, with some sections of the party favoring different dynastical visions and some leaning towards accidentalism, prepared to accept a republican project.

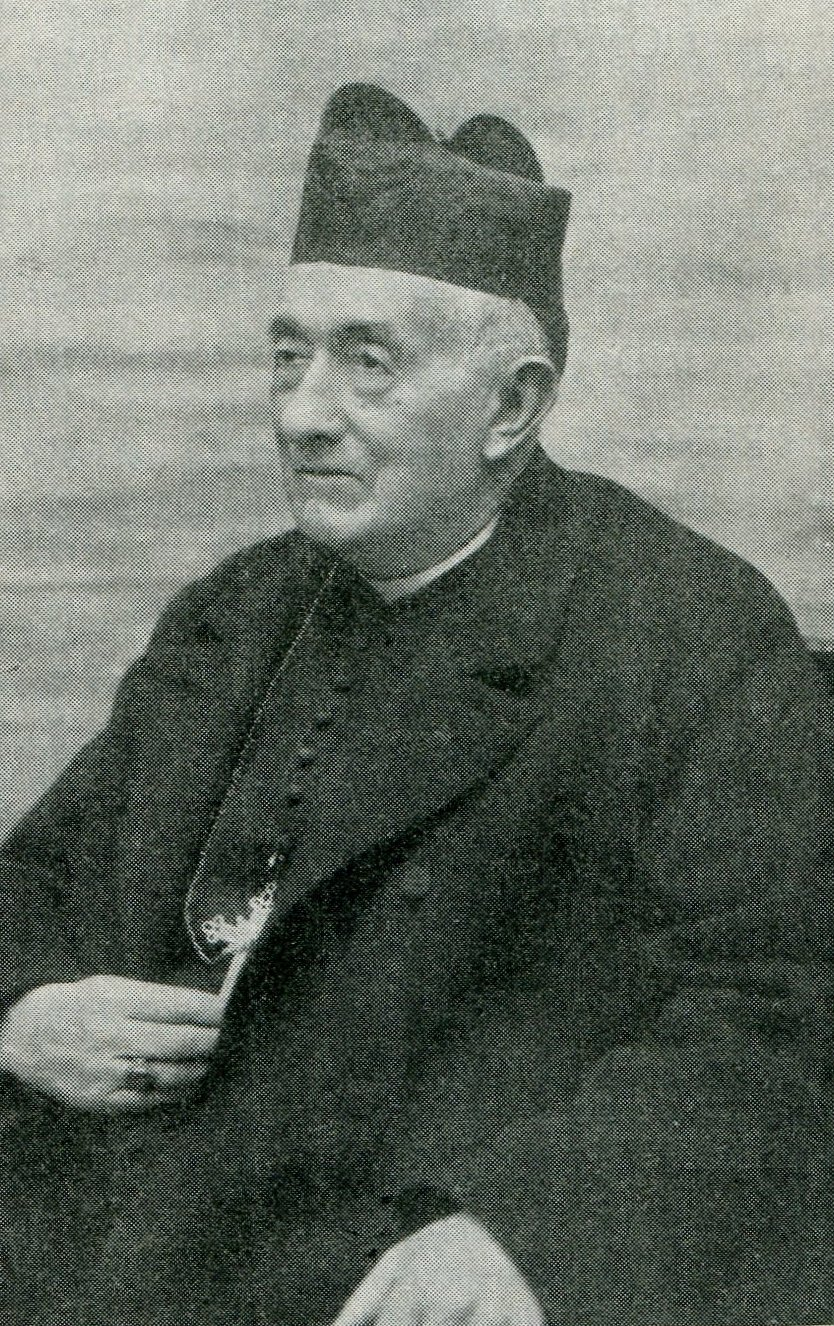
primate Aguirre

Integrism, conceived by Nocedal as political arm of Spanish Catholicism, has never gained more than lukewarm support of the bishops, alienated by its belligerent intransigence. During the Olazábal leadership things went from bad to worse, as the party was increasingly out of tune with the new Church policy. In the early 20th century the Spanish hierarchy abandoned its traditional strategy of influencing key individuals within the liberal monarchy, and switched to mass mobilisation carried by means of broad popular structures and party politics. The Integrists were reluctant to be one of many Catholic parties, despised the democratic format of policy-making and refused to accept "malmenorismo". Since Olazábal cultivated traditionalist vision of Catholic political engagement, in 1910s and 1920s Partido Católico Nacional was dramatically outpaced by new breed of modern christian-democratic organizations.

Refusing to take part in primoderiverista structures Olazábal focused on La Constancia; his 10-hectare Mundaiz estate became an Integrist shrine. Though Partido Católico Nacional was suspended, its offshoot organizations continued to function. Controlling them was getting increasingly difficult. In 1927 Olazábal expulsed the entire San Sebastian branch of Juventud Integrista, a severe loss given its leader, Ignacio Maria Echaide, launched the Juventud in 1910–1914. In 1930 Integrism re-emerged as Comunión Tradicionalista-Integrista. Still headed by Olazábal it maintained local branches in almost all Spanish provinces and re-affirmed its traditional principles, though with little electoral success.

== Republic and war ==
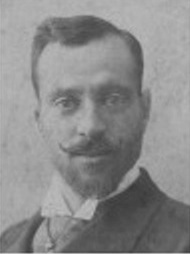
Bernardo Elío y Elío

Militant republican secularism was acknowledged by the Integrists as a barbarian onslaught against the very foundations of civilisation. Overwhelmed be the Leftist sway, Olazábal realized that his party stood little chance of surviving on its own. The row between traditionalist Integrism and modern christian-democratic groupings was already too wide and very few in the party considered rapprochement. On the other hand, ultraconservative vision of religion was shared by mainstream Carlists; as a result, Integristas rather unanimously decided to swallow their accidentalism. Following 44 years of separate political existence Olazábal led them to 1932 reunification within Carlism, into the party named Comunión Tradicionalista. Though formally the provincial party leader was Bernardo Elío y Elío, in fact Olazábal formed a local ruling duumvirate.

Within consolidated Carlism the former Integrists remained a very influential group. By means of a new publishing house, Editorial Tradicionalista, they continued to control El Siglo Futuro, which became a semi-official Carlist daily. Many former Integros, like a Cantabrian Jose Luis Zamanillo, Castillano José Lamamie, Alicantino Manuel Senante or Andalusian Manuel Fal assumed top positions within the party. Olazábal, due to his age hardly involved in day-to-day business, became sort of a mentor and moral authority. The visible Integrist impact on Comunión Tradicionalista triggered some grumblings among Carlists, especially among the Navarrese.

Olazábal kept lambasting secular republicanism, which cost El Siglo Futuro and La Constancia periodical administrative suspensions (the first one in August 1931) and Olazábal himself a police detention; he spent three days in jail. Always championing local traditional establishments, he was profoundly disappointed by turn of the Basque cause. He denounced the initial autonomy draft as godless, considering also the Estella Statute version anti-religious and anti-fuerist. Within the united Carlist community he and Victor Pradera led the anti-statute group, as opposed to the pro-statute Carlists represented by José Luis Oriol, Marcelino Oreja and Joaquín Beunza. The divided Carlists refrained from taking a clear political stance, which eventually contributed to failure of the autonomy project.

Carlist standard

It is not clear whether Olazábal was engaged in Carlist preparations to rebellion and whether he was even aware of the forthcoming insurgency. Following the outbreak of hostilities he remained in San Sebastian, where the coup failed, and went on editing La Constancia. He was detained on one of the ships anchored in San Sebastian and later moved to the Bilbao Angeles Custodios prison. Since the Basque government did not deploy autonomous police to protect the building during the unrest, caused by the nationalist bombing raid over the city, the prison was entrusted to the UGT militia unit. On 4 January the socialist militiamen executed around 100 prisoners; some were killed by hand grenades thrown into the cells, some were shot and some were reportedly slashed with machetes. It is not clear how exactly Juan Olazábal died.

== See also ==
- Ramón Nocedal Romea
- Manuel Senante Martinez
