= Antonio Aparisi Guijarro =

Spanish politician and journalist

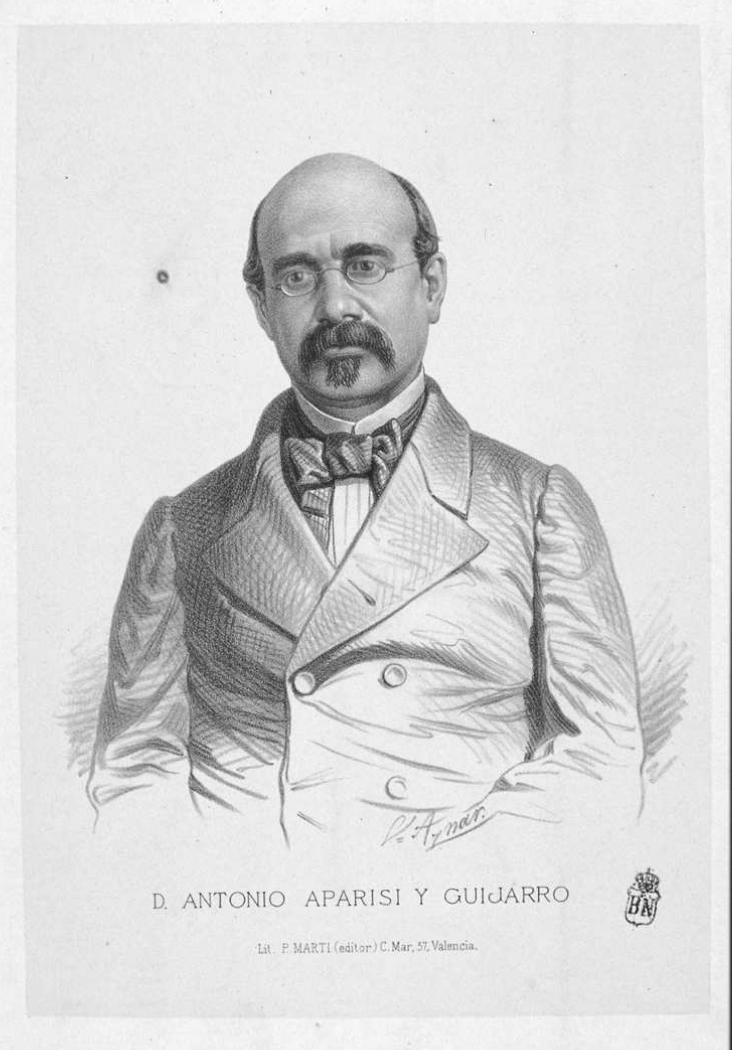
Antonio Aparisi Guijarro

Antonio Aparisi y Guijarro (29 March 1815 – 5 November 1872) was a Spanish politician and journalist.

== Biography ==
Born in Valencia, Guijarro grew up in poverty but was still able to study in the Andresiano School of his native city and attended the University of Valencia and later the University of Madrid earning his degree, where he majored in law and become a consultant in the court. He was very much a traditionalist and believer in retaining Catholic religious values and ideals and did much for as a journalist and writer. In 1843, he founded the magazine La Restauración, and in 1855 the newspaper El Pensamiento of Valencia. He joined the ranks of the so-called neocatólicos, after his election in 1858 as deputy to Congress in representation of Valencia. From 1862 to 1872, he directed La Regeneración, and in these years also collaborated in La Esperanza and La Estrella.

In 1865, he was again deputy for Valencia and Pamplona and, the following year, was named a member of the Real Academia de la Lengua. On the revolution of September 1868, he was forced into exile in France. In 1870, he attended a conference on Carlism in Vevey, Switzerland, and in that same year, he received a private audience with Pope Pius IX. On his return to Spain, he was elected senator of Guipúzcoa province, a position he held until his death on 8 November 1872.

Very influenced in his thought by Jaime Balmes and Juan Donoso Cortés, his work today is an important example of Spanish traditionalism.

== Works ==
- Oda al Sol.
- Oda a la Espada de don Jaime en Conquistador.
- Oda a España y Africa.
- La Cuestión Dinástica (1869).
- El Rey de España (1869).
- Restauración (1872).
- Doña Inés de Castro.
- La Muerte de Don Fadrique.
- Pensamientos y Poesías.
- Discursos Parlamentarios.
- Discursos Forenses.
- Obras Completas (5 vols., 1873–1877).
