= Agustín González de Amezúa y Mayo =

Spanish politician

Agustín González de Amezúa
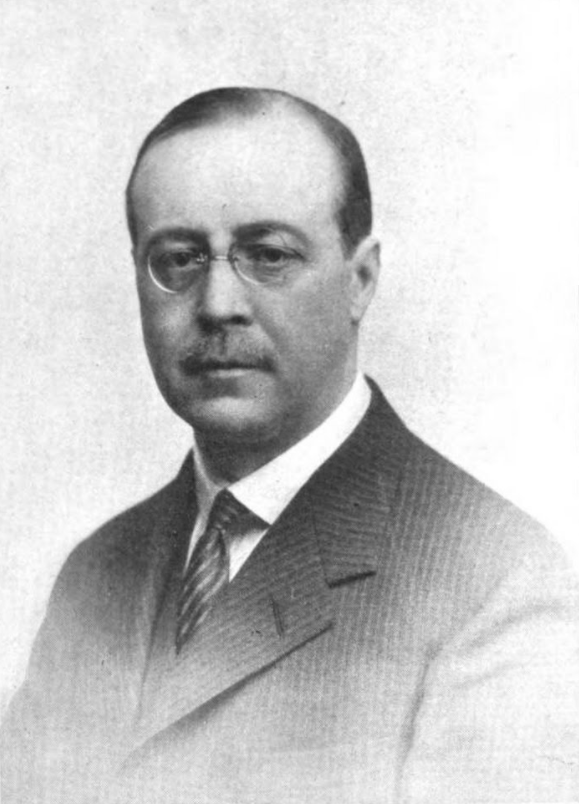
- Born: Agustín González de Amezúa y Mayo; 30 August 1881; Madrid, Spain
- Died: 10 June 1956 (aged 74); Madrid, Spain
- Occupations: Entrepreneur, academic
- Political party: Integrism, Carlism

Seat Z of the Real Academia Española
- In office 24 February 1929 – 10 June 1956
- Preceded by: José Rodríguez Carracido
- Succeeded by: Agustín de Foxá

Agustín González de Amezúa y Mayo (30 August 1881 – 10 June 1956) was a Spanish academic, member of Real Academia Española, Real Academia de la Historia and Real Academia de Jurisprudencia y Legislación. He is best known as historian of literature who specialized in Siglo de Oro, especially in works of Cervantes and Lope de Vega. He held various important scientific posts during early Francoism, especially in Consejo Superior de Investigaciónes Científicas. Politically he supported the Traditionalist cause, first as an Integrist and then as a Carlist militant; in the early 1940s he was in national executive of Comunión Tradicionalista. In the mid-1920s he was member of the Madrid ayuntamiento.

== Family and youth ==
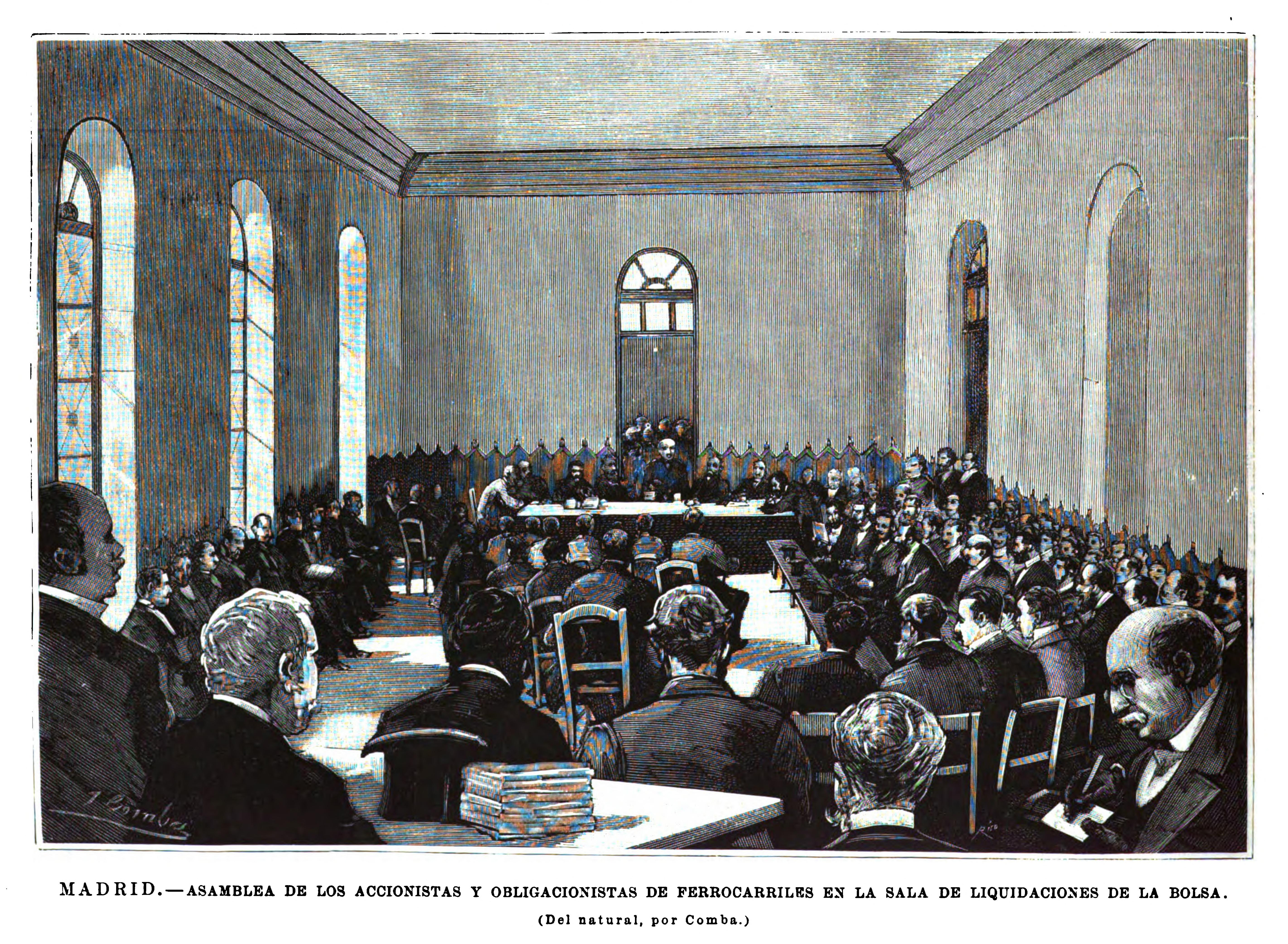
Madrid stock exchange, 1890s

None of the sources consulted provides information on González de Amezúa's distant ancestors; some authors claim that the family originated from La Rioja. His father, Enrique González de Amezúa y Muñoz (died 1909), was a member of mid-range Madrid bourgeoisie. At least since the late 1860s he had been working as a broker at the stock exchange and reportedly greatly contributed to its operations during the turbulent times of the Glorious Revolution and the early Restoration. Over time he became one of the most prestigious brokers; in the late 1890s he was a member of Junta Sindical of the Colegio de Agentes de Cambio y Bolsa, and in the early 20th century he became the president of the body. At an unspecified time he married Luisa Mayo Albert (died 1934), a descendant of a well-off family involved in trade and finances. Her father and Amezúa's maternal grandfather Manuel Mayo de la Fuente originated from the Philippines; he became a distinguished lawyer and landholder. In the mid-1860s he served two terms in the Cortes and was Director General de Contribuciones in the Ministerio de Hacienda.

Enrique and Luisa settled in Madrid. They had nine children, born between the mid-1870s and the late 1880s; three of them perished either in infancy or in their youth. Agustín was born as the third oldest son; all received very religious and pious educations. In the mid-1890s he frequented the Jesuit college in Valladolid, where he obtained the bachillerato. At an unspecified time in the late 1890s he entered the faculty of law at Universidad Central in Madrid. Some sources claim he graduated in 1901, but others point rather to 1902; his thesis was titled Historia de la Paz y Tratado de los Pirineos que se concluyó a 7 de noviembre de 1659. Amezúa entered the bar and was employed in the office of "a known lawyer" in Madrid; some authors are more specific and maintain that he practiced in the firm of Luis Díaz Cobeña.

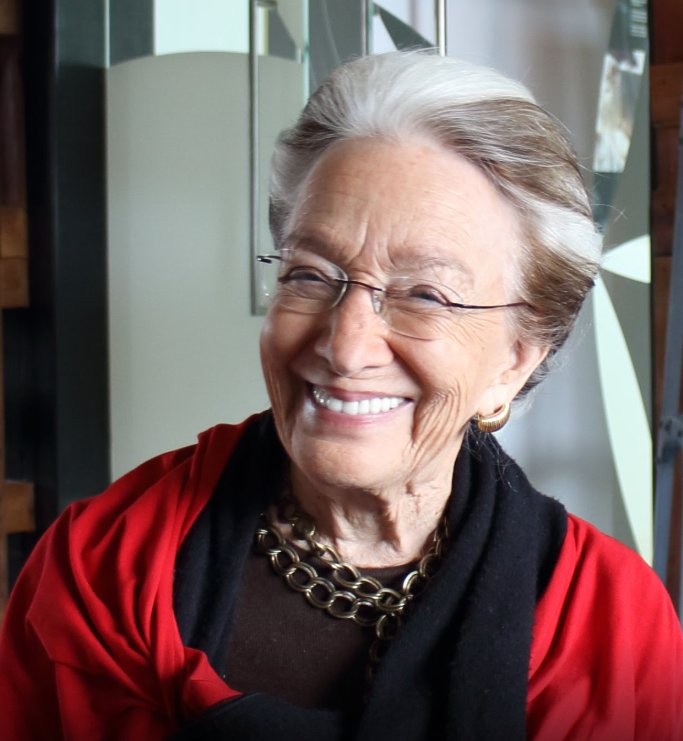
Daughter Clara María

In 1911 Amezúa married Primitiva Noriega González (died 1983); there is nothing known about her or her family. The couple lived in downtown Madrid and had five children, born between the early 1910s and the late 1920s. The oldest sons, Javier and Álvaro, were killed by the Republicans during an early stage of the civil war. Ramón became an engineer and a nationally recognized organist; from 1991 to 2008 he presided over the Real Academia de Bellas Artes and until 2007 he led the executive board of TeleMadrid. The youngest child, Clara María, was a living legend of Spanish gourmet. The best known of Agustín's grandchildren is Mercedes González de Amezúa y del Pino, a historian of art, curator and author. Among Agustín's siblings the oldest brother Manuel became a businessman, but he is known rather as co-founder of the Club Alpino Español. The youngest brother Enrique entered diplomacy and served on foreign missions for the Republic and for Francoist Spain. Agustín's maternal uncle was the Integrist political leader, Ramón Nocedal.

== Man of affairs ==
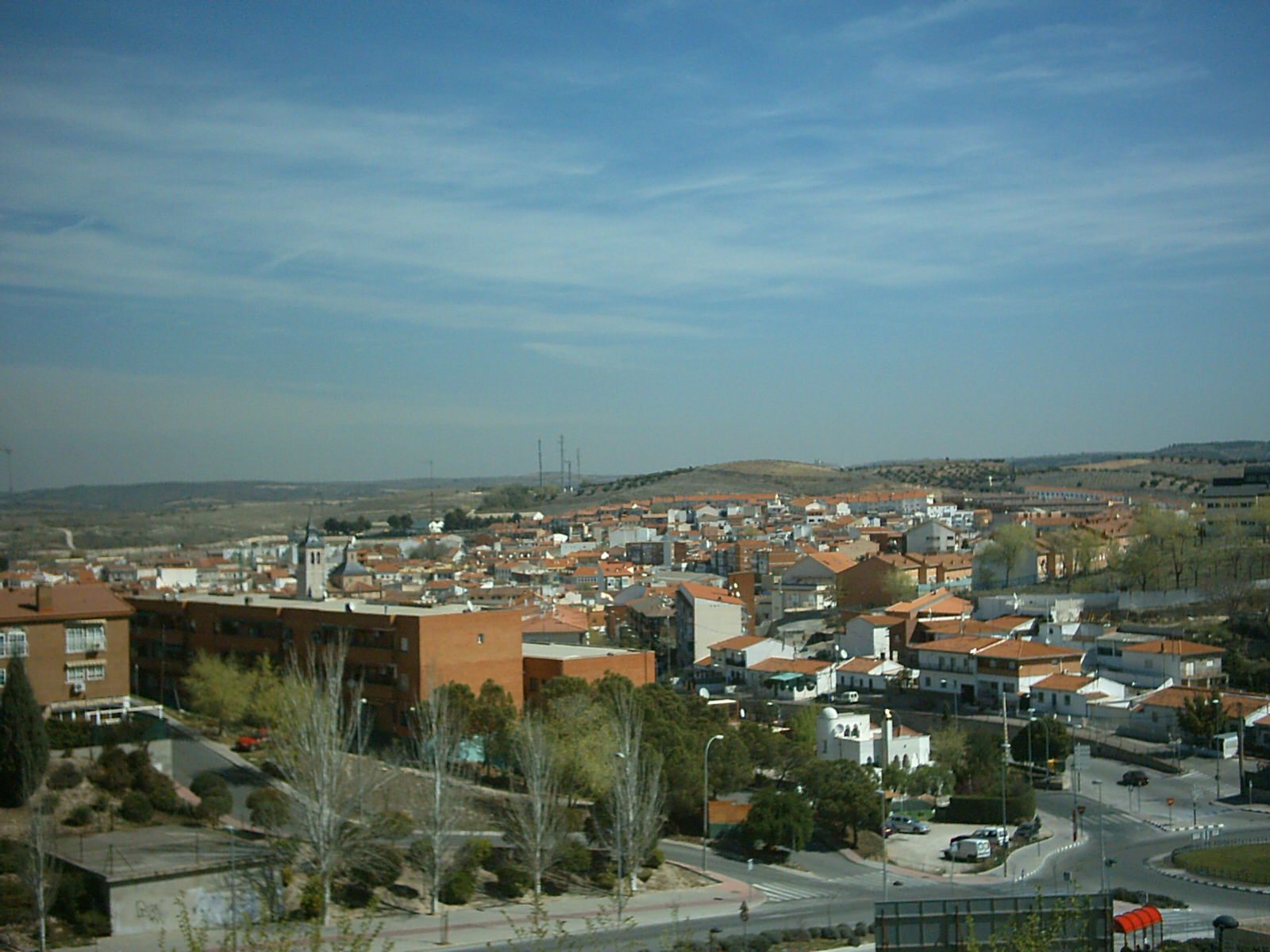
Arganda del Rey, present view

Amezúa's practice as a lawyer did not last long, though it is not clear exactly when he abandoned the bar and switched to business. At an unspecified time in the early 20th century he either inherited or otherwise assumed management of the La Poveda sugar plant in Arganda del Rey, built probably by either one of his ancestors or one of his relatives. Apart from daily business, he remained fairly active also as a theorist; in 1917 he released La cuestión del azúcar. Observaciones sobre su tasa, in 1918 La cuestión del azúcar. Informes y observaciones elevados a los poderes públicos, and in 1924 Memoria de las mejoras introducidas en la Fábrica y Ferrocarriles de la Sociedad Azucarera de Madrid. In the mid-1920s he represented Industria Azucarera Española in the Consejo de la Economía Nacional, and voiced in issues related to the sugar trade with Cuba and numerous other issues of the sugar industry. In the late 1920s he rose to high positions in Sociedad Azucarera de España, the Spanish sugar trust, and co-ordinated some of its projects also in the early 1930s.

At an unspecified time Amezúa engaged also in the alcohol industry. In 1932 he was among the top managers of the Asociación de Fabricantes de Alcoholes Industriales and represented the institution in the newly formed Instituto Nacional del Vino. After the war he was the managing director of the Unión Alcoholera Española S.A., and in name of the holding in 1940 he negotiated refurbishment of manufacturing premises in Valencia. In the early 1940s he presided over the Organería Española. It was his son who played a part in Amezúa's engagement in Ferrovial, the construction-transport conglomerate set up by Rafael de Pino in 1952. Ramón was married to his sister; Pino concluded that a prestigious academic with a business background would help him open many doors, and offered Amezúa the position of president of the board. The plan worked out and the same year Ferrovial closed the first deal with RENFE. According to one source Amezúa held some roles in the Banco de España, but there are neither details nor confirmation provided.

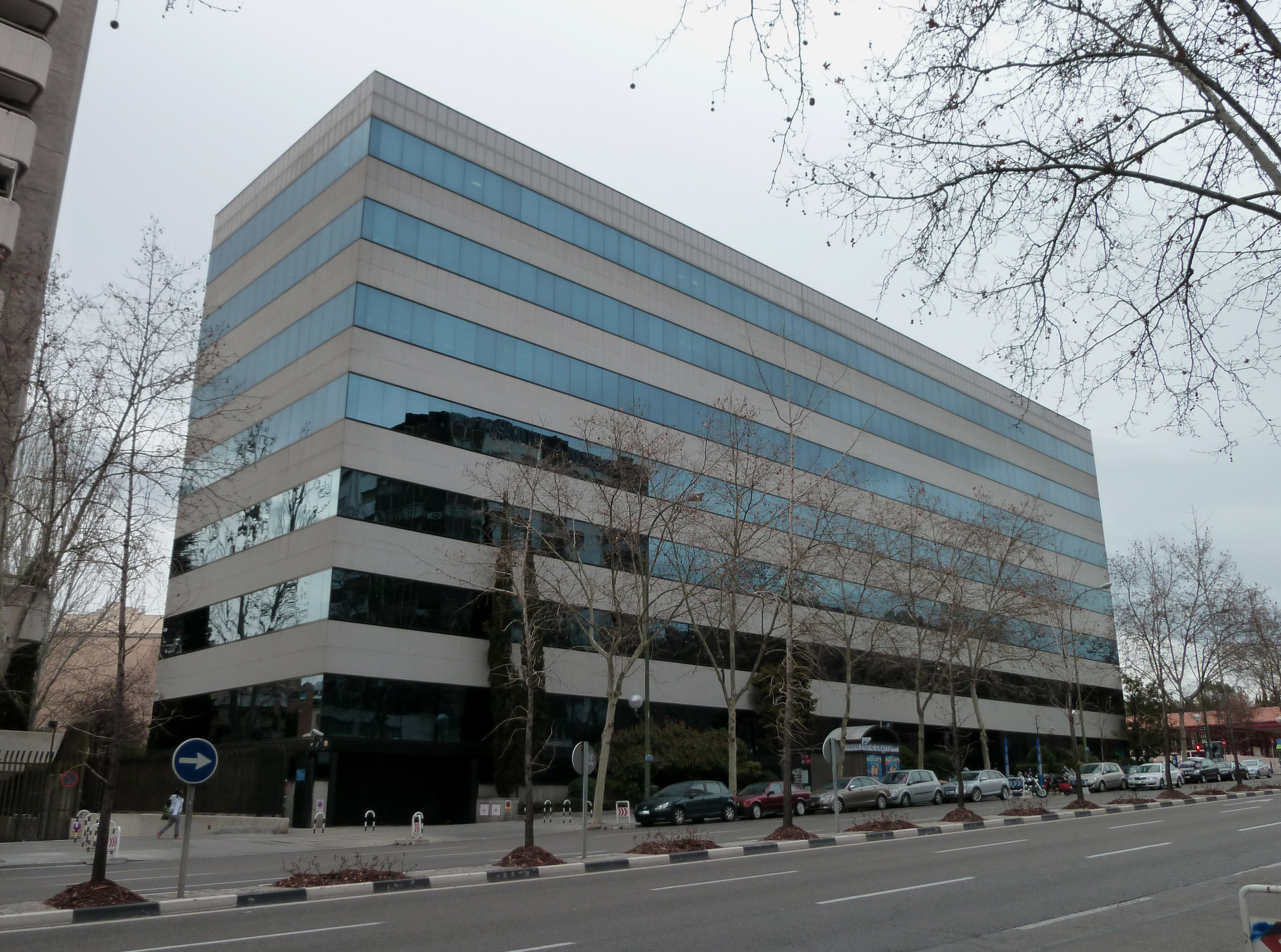
Present Ferrovial headquarters

Amezúa was fairly successful as a businessman and already in the early 1920s he was an affluent member of the Madrid bourgeoisie. In 1924 he contracted Luis Gutiérrez Soto, at the time the Chief Architect of the Ministry of Public Instruction, to design his house in the prestigious so-called Triángulo Cultural quarter in Madrid. It was completed by other architects as a palacete with eclectic, historicist, regionalist, and baroque features; the front was occupied by a giant, two-storey library. Amezúa lived there during the following thirty-two years; currently the building serves as Casa de Galicia, the property of regional Galician authorities. In 1940 Gutiérrez Soto designed also the refurbishment of Amezúa's property near his sugar plant in Arganda del Rey, known as Vilches, which was further upgraded in 1956. Amezúa owned also another rural estate, his favorite summer getaway, named Dehesa de Cid and located in the village of Sanchorreja near Ávila.

== Historian of literature ==
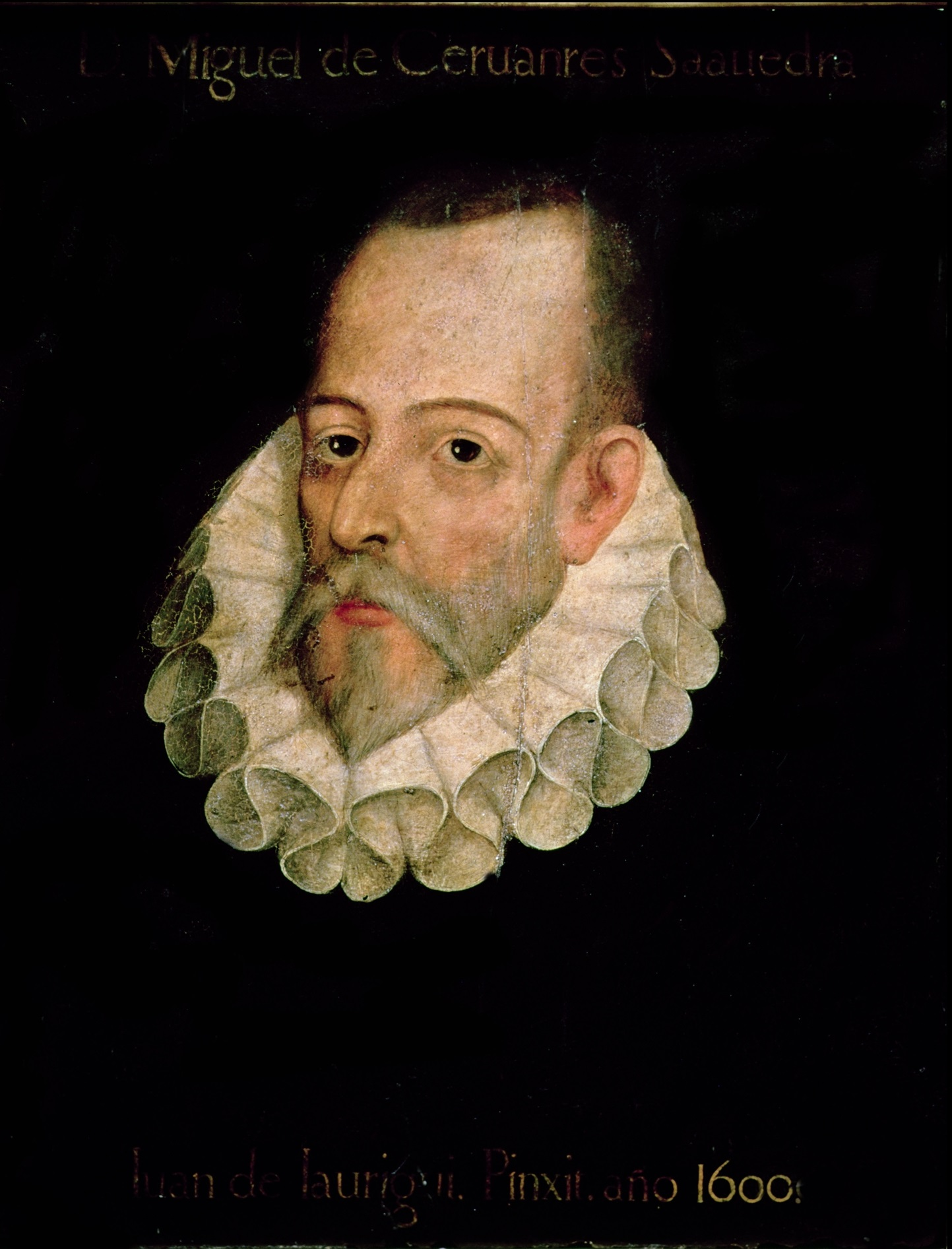
Cervantes

Though a lawyer by profession, Amezúa developed an interest in letters and history. He was inspired mostly by his erudite uncle Ramón Nocedal and his guests who met during weekly intellectual sessions, mostly Marcelino Menéndez y Pelayo; despite the age difference, the two became close friends. In his research Amezúa focused almost exclusively on the so-called Siglo de Oro and became an acknowledged cervantista. Already in 1909 the Real Academia de la Lengua rewarded him with the Medalla de Oro for a critical edition of El casamiento engañoso and El coloquio de los perros by Cervantes, to be published in 1912. However, his key work is Cervantes creador de la Novela corta española (1956), a multi-volume edition of Cervantes’ stories with innovative and massive analytical introduction. He also prologued or contributed to a number of studies or re-editions and published a handful of shorter articles on the author of Don Quijote in the popular press.

Another of Amezúa's favorite authors was Lope de Vega. The work which stands out is Epistolario de Lope de Vega Carpio (1935–1943), a four-volume publication of Lope's correspondence accompanied by an extensive and rigorous analytical study. Far smaller was Una colección manuscrita y desconocida de comedias de Lope de Vega Carpio (1945), an edition of previously unpublished theatrical pieces. Un enigma descifrado. El raptor de la hija de Lope de Vega (1934) was a historiographic-literary study upon a mysterious episode from Lope's life. His opus was complete with a number of minor works, published as prologues to re-edited Lope de Vega works or as articles in scientific reviews or in daily newspapers.

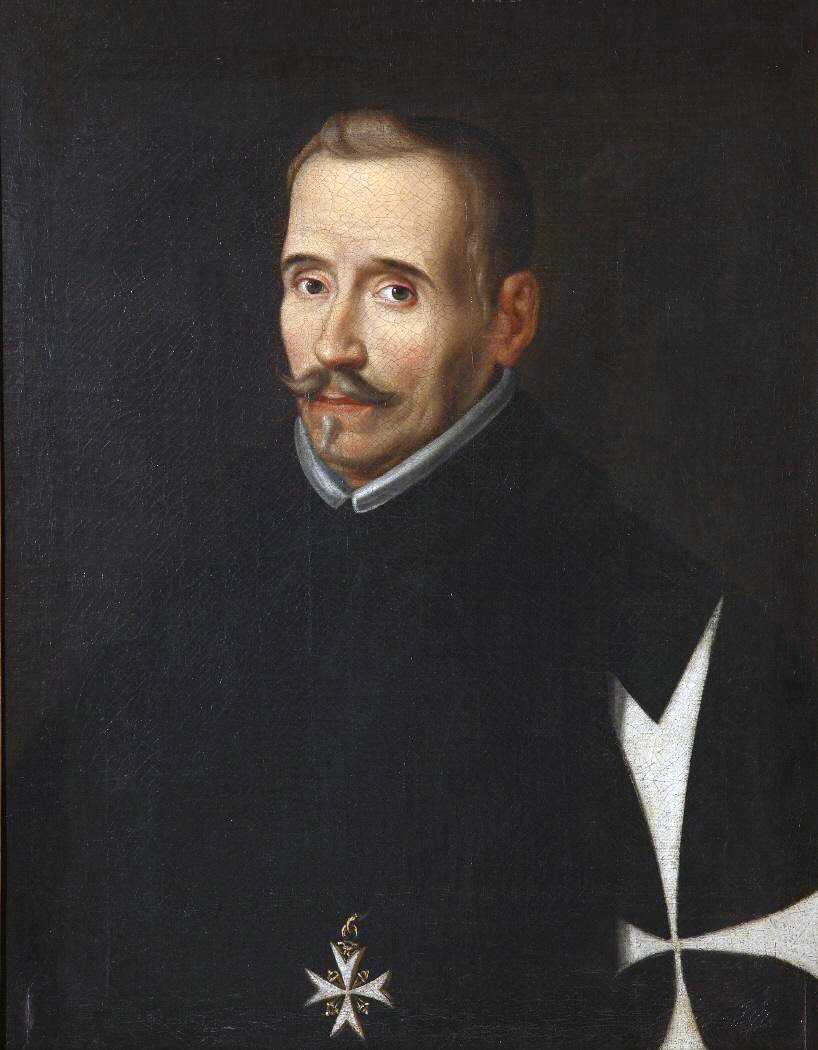
Lope de Vega

Among studies dealing with other authors of the Siglo de Oro the one of particular weight was Formación y elementos de la novela cortesana (1929), the study on the emergence of a genre that he dubbed “courtly novel”; he listed three of its typical features, namely urban setting, aristocratic characters, and "erotically motivated" plot. He also studied, edited, and published works of somewhat forgotten authors, like Juan Rufo (1923), Juan Enríquez de Zúñiga (1932), Antonio de Torquemada (1943), Alonso de Meneses (1946), Andrés Rey de Artieda (1947), Juan Pérez de Montalbán (1949), Diego de San Pedro (1952) and Juan de Flores (1954). Other minor works include studies dedicated to Menendez Pelayo, typography, polemical debates, the Spanish reception of Dante and other topics. Amezúa's contribution to the history of Spanish literature consists also of his documentary passion. He inherited Nocedal's massive collection of old prints and enlarged it in the course of the following decades, purchasing manuscripts, old books, and acquiring private collections, e.g. the correspondence between Benito Pérez Galdós and Emilia Pardo Bazán. He donated the entire collection to the Real Academia Española in 1953.

== Historiography, periodismo and political theory ==
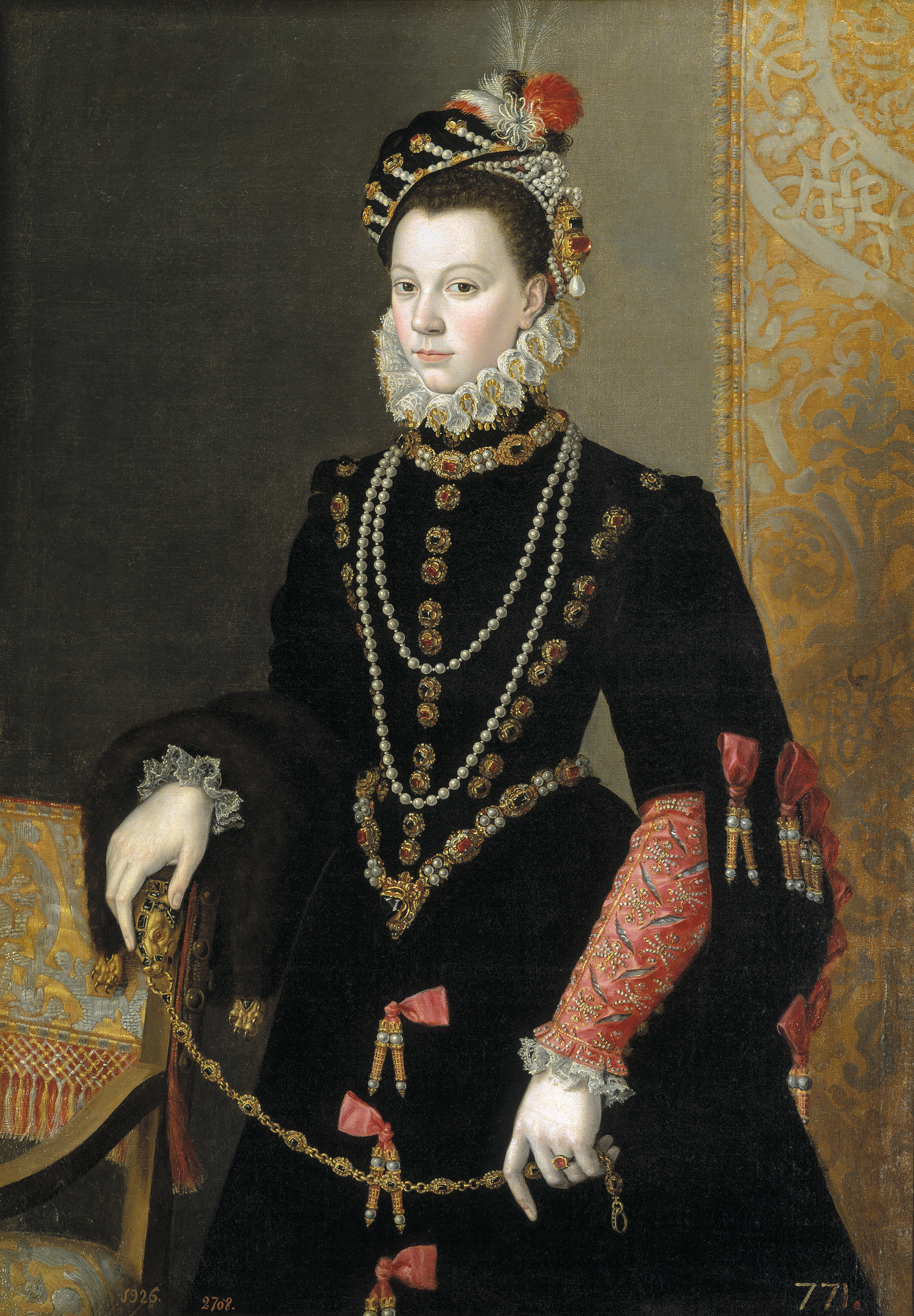
Isabel de Valois

Historiography was, after literature, another field where Amezúa contributed with some high quality works. The most significant one is a multi-volume study on the Spanish Renaissance queen Isabel de Valois (1949); the same ruler was offered also a minor article. Another major study was La batalla de Lucena y el verdadero retrato de Boabdil (1915), a 200-page analysis of an episode from the very late period of the Reconquista. Mid-size works are Andanzas y meditaciones de un procurador castellano en las Cortes de Madrid (1945) and Un modelo de estadistas. El marqués de la Enseñada (1917), the latter uniquely going beyond the Golden Age period. Minor contributions are articles scattered across scientific periodicals and dealing with various aspects of 17th century Spain, including municipal regulations, early police forces, distinguished personalities or travelling. Amezúa also prologued a number of publications, including sets of modern era documents, reprints of older books or bibliographical collections.

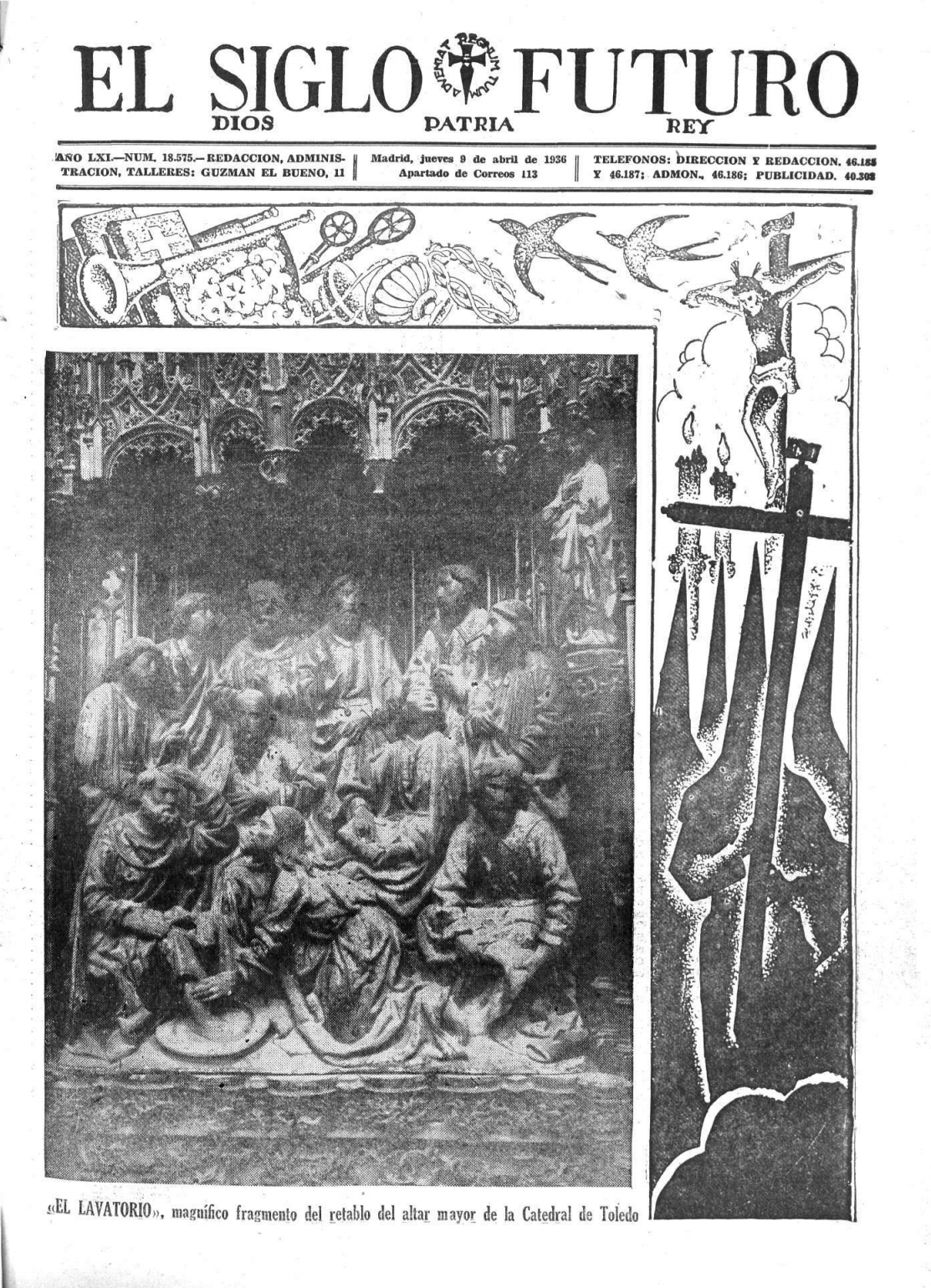
El Siglo Futuro, issue from 1936

From the early 1900s till the 1930s Amezúa published some thirty culture-focused articles in El Siglo Futuro, usually unsigned or signed with a pen-name "Zeuma". In the 1940s and 1950s he contributed some 100 pieces to ABC and La Vanguardia; apart from a few exceptions they all dwelled on the history of literature and culture, though some contained political undertones, e.g. related to Gibraltar. His particular focus was on lexicology and revealed that he aspired to a normative role; Amezúa campaigned against foreign words or regionalisms and advocated the purity of the language; he tried to invent words supposed to replace foreign intrusions, e.g. "navideña" instead of "Christmas" (adjective) and "popularismo" instead of "folklore". A contemporary scholar describes him as "amante del español castizo, cultivador de un estilo arcaizante". Another area of Amezúa's publishing activity was political theory; like in literature and historiography, he excelled in editorial work and providing introductory or analytical commentary. This was the case with Obras de don Ramón de Nocedal (1907–1914), which gathered articles, manuscript works, and Cortes addresses by the master of his youth. Another example is a prologue to Política general by Juan Vázquez de Mella, (1932), already calibrated as a Traditionalist propaganda publication with contributions of Conde Rodezno, Víctor Pradera, Salvador Minguijón or Miguel Fernandez Peñaflor; there are also other minor pieces. Most of his smaller works, including these from the history of literature, were re-published or published in three volumes of the Opúsculos Histórico-Literarios (1951–1953). One scholar writing in 1958 identified his seventy-nine works in total, but recently another student arrived at 250 titles.

== Academic ==
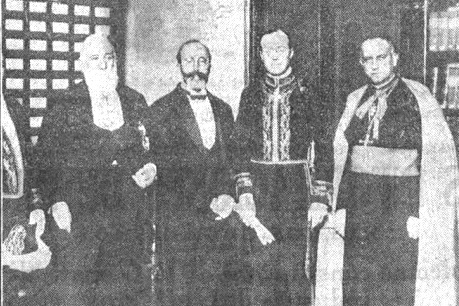
Amezúa (2fR) admitted to RAE

Since the late 1900s Amezúa focused almost entirely on science, and in 1909 his treatise on Cervantes, to be published few years later, earned him the Medalla de Oro of the Real Academía de la Lengua. In 1912 he became the librarian of the Academia de Jurisprudencia y Legislación. In 1914 he was the moving spirit behind the setup of Sociedad de Bibliófilos Españoles and later labored to publish many of its luxurious publications. In 1929 he entered the Real Academia de la Lengua, the highest Spanish authority in the world of letters; his entry lecture was Formación y elementos característicos de la novela cortesana. In the name of RAE he worked to reclaim the original house of Lope de Vega in Madrid; when successful in 1930, he managed the refurbishment works. In 1935 he entered the Junta Protectora de las Bibliotecas y Archivos Ecclesiásticos, a body set up by the Church and entrusted with protection of its written heritage. In 1938 Amezúa was nominated treasurer of the Insituto de España, a freshly created Francoist body intended to replace Junta de Ampliación de Estudios. It was soon replaced by the Consejo Superior de Investigaciónes Científicas; within CSIC he later presided in perpetuity over a sub-section named Patronato Saavedra Fajardo. In 1939 he became the treasurer of the Real Academia Española and soon afterwards he was nominated to the Junta de Patronato de la Biblioteca Nacional. In 1940 he emerged as hermano mayor of the newly created Pontificia y Real Asociación de Represión de la Blasfemia. In 1941 he took management of the Centro de Estudios de Lope de Vega, his personal brainchild intended to protect Lope's patrimony and to study and propagate his works; however, the institution operated briefly and was later incorporated into the RAE structures. In 1942 Amezúa was elected to the Real Academia de la Historia; he took his seat in 1944 with the lecture Una reina de España en la intimidad: Isabel de Valois.

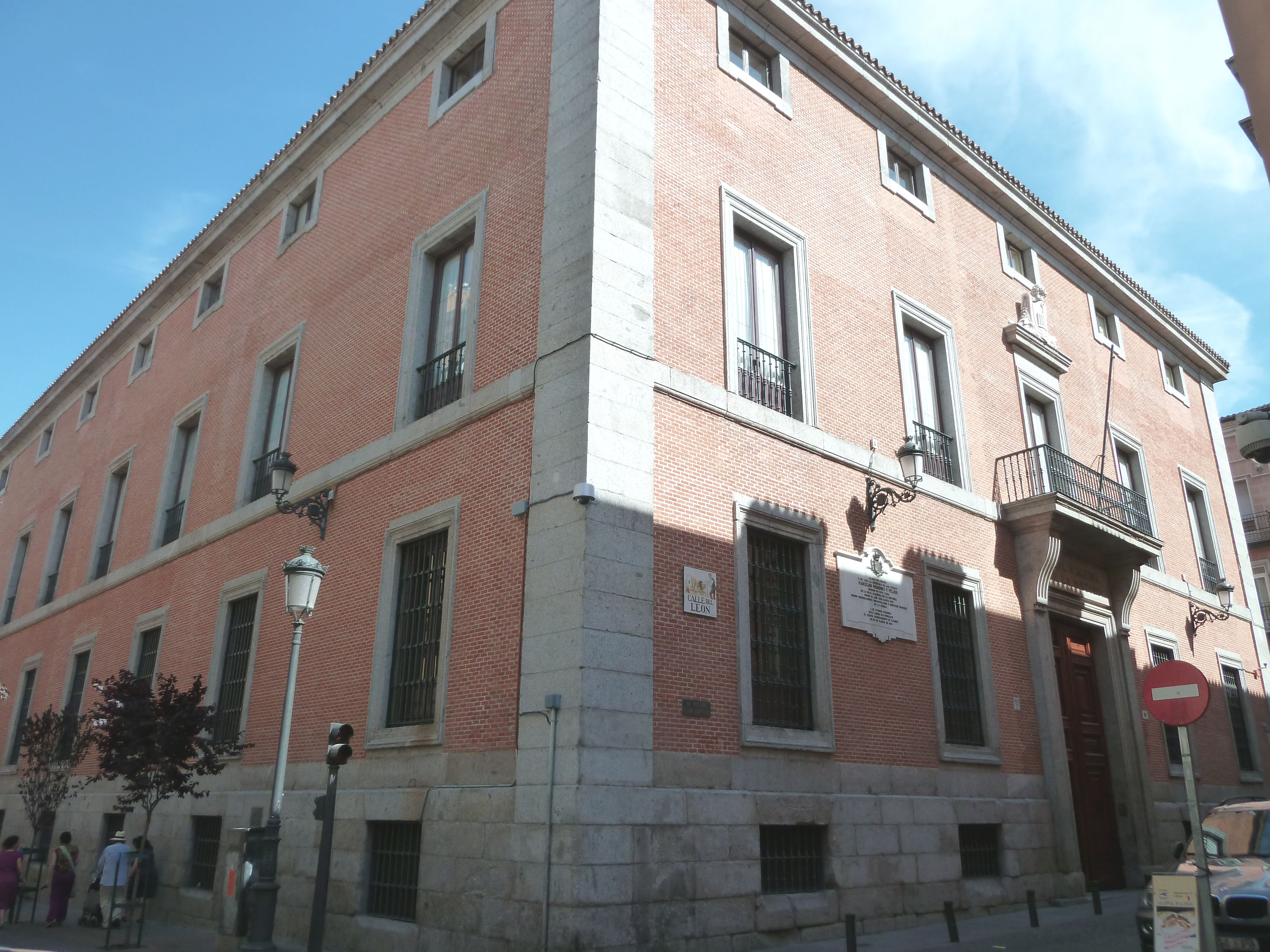
RAH building today

In 1945 Amezúa entered the third royal academy, this time the Real Academia de Jurisprudencia y Legislación; his entry lecture was Andanzas y meditaciones de un procurador castellano en las Cortes de Madrid de 1592 a 1598. In 1951 he was among the founding members of the Instituto de Estudios Madrileños; according to some authors he served as its president until his death and according to some until the mid-1950s. In 1951 he travelled to Mexico as head of the Spanish delegation for the I Congreso de Academias de la Lengua Española and worked to create the Asociación Internacional de Academias de la Lengua Española. From 1951 to 1956 he presided over the Comisión Permanente del Congreso de Academias de Lengua. In 1952 Amezúa was among the founding fathers of the Sociedad Española de Publicistas. In 1953 he was elected director of the Real Academia de Historia and directed it until his death. In 1956 he was active preparing the II Congreso de Academias da la Lengua Española; shortly before his death he assumed management of Boletín de la Real Academia de la Historia.

== Between Integrism and Carlism ==
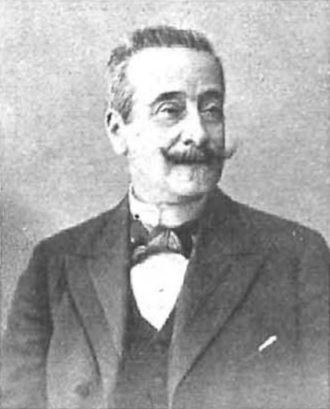
Ramón Nocedal

Amezúa's parents politically supported the Traditionalist branch, since the 1880s known as Integrism. As a young man Agustín was particularly influenced by its leader and his maternal uncle, the charismatic Ramón Nocedal. The families lived closely and Amezúa spent hours in Nocedal's enormous library; he also at least witnessed intellectual sessions staged there and naturally absorbed the Integrist outlook. Already during Nocedal's lifetime he started to edit and publish his works; after Nocedal's death in 1909 he completed the task in 1914. Since 1905, and during the 1910s and 1920s he kept contributing to the flagship Integrist newspaper, the Madrid-based El Siglo Futuro. He signed only a few pieces. Most are unsigned or signed with pen-names. However, in his contributions he stayed clear of politics and ideology; some thirty articles focused rather on culture and grand Spanish literature.

Amezúa's first steps in politics are not clear. In 1924 he entered the Madrid ayuntamiento; during the Primo de Rivera dictatorship its members were not elected but nominated by the civil governor. None of the sources consulted clarifies what mechanism got him elevated to the town hall. He remained a rather active councilor, especially after he entered and then assumed the presidency of the Comisión de Hacienda. Amezúa worked to re-organize municipal economic structures, especially with regards to tenancy and city-controlled companies; he remained engaged in the development of the local tram network and was behind improvements to the Canal de Isabel II, the urban water supplier. His term expired in 1927; it is not clear whether he resigned or was not re-appointed. His only official engagement prior to the fall of the monarchy was the 1930 appointment to the Comisión Mixta Arbitral Agraria, an arbitrary board set up by the Ministerio de Trabajo y Previsión.

Carlist standard

The advent of the Second Republic produced rapprochement between various Traditionalist branches. At the turn of 1931 and 1932 the Integrists merged within the Carlist organisation, the Comunión Tradicionalista; Amezúa was among a strong and robust Integrist contingent. He focused on culture. In 1933 he started publishing single pieces in an ambitious Carlist review, entitled Tradición; and two years later he entered its editorial board. In 1934 he was nominated to the Consejo de Cultura, a body designed as guardians of Traditionalist orthodoxy, kept contributing to the now semi-official Carlist daily El Siglo Futuro and delivered lectures at Carlist gatherings, e.g. during the Congreso Nacional de Juventudes Tradicionalistas. In 1935 the claimant Alfonso Carlos nominated him to another body, the Consejo de Hacienda, supposed to look after the party finances. Amezúa's stand with regard to dilemmas of Carlist politics is not clear; however, in 1934 he was a member of the Junta Directiva of Acción Española, a platform which advanced dynastical reconciliation and united some Carlists and some Alfonsists.

== Between Carlism and Francoism ==
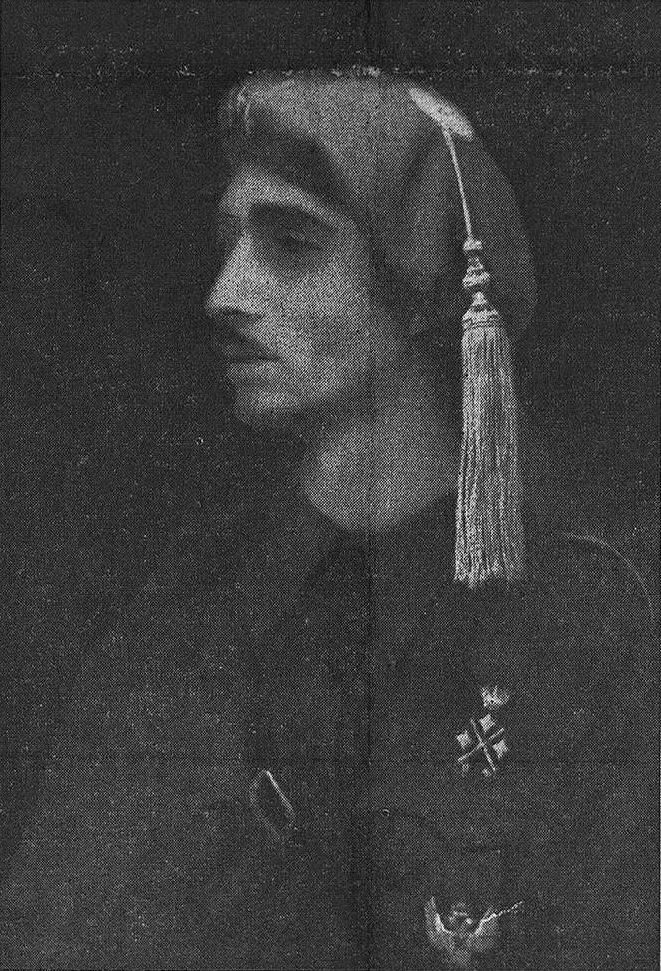
Don Javier

Amezúa was at least aware of the anti-Republican conspiracy of 1936, as his two oldest sons were actively engaged in the Madrid requeté preparations. In the chaos which engulfed the capital on July 18/19 Javier and Álvaro failed to make it to the Montaña barracks and soon had to go into hiding, to be captured and killed later. Amezúa also soon decided to seek shelter in an unidentified foreign legation. He was evacuated from the Republican zone some time in 1937, as in early 1938 he was already nominated to the Francoist Instituto de España, based in Burgos; he returned to Madrid in 1939. Amezúa remained engaged in the semi-legal, independent Carlist current. When Misión, the party review styled as a generic Catholic periodical, was in 1940 moved from Pamplona to Madrid, he entered its broad editorial board. In 1943 he co-signed the so-called Reclamación del Poder, a letter by key Carlist pundits addressed to Franco; the signatories demanded introduction of the traditionalist monarchy. The same year the regent-claimant Don Javier nominated him to the Junta Nacional, the collegial executive. However, at the time Amezúa again demonstrated some leaning towards some sort of dynastic reconciliation. In 1944 he supported the suggestion of the Navarrese leader Jesús Elizalde that the Alfonsist claimant Don Juan be cautiously approached. In 1945 he seemed sympathetic towards the proposal of Araúz de Robles, namely that a collective Regencia Nacional be set up.

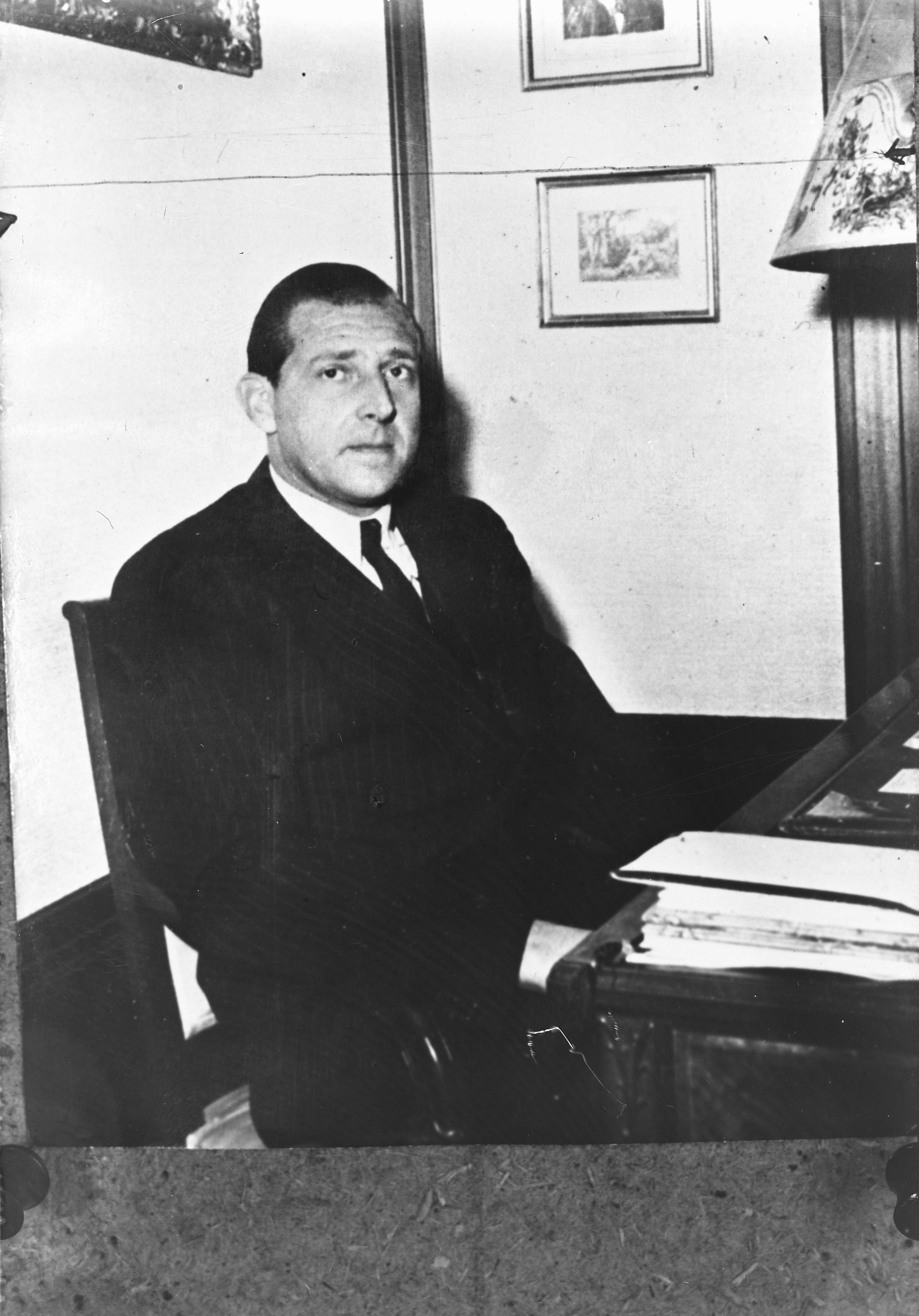
Don Juan

In 1946 it was already clear that “within the Carlist structures there was a pro-juanista current, which though not significant numerically, remained quite active especially given political weight of its representatives, principally José M. Arauz de Robles and Agustín González de Amezúa.” The same year he wrote a lengthy memorandum addressed to Conde Rodezno, the chief Juanista at the time already beyond the party discipline. Amezúa's suggestions bordered loyalty to the regent; he advocated nomination of the new Junta Nacional, clarification of the regency question, forging a specific and clear line versus the regime and other monarchist currents, re-organizing Comunión and approaching Don Juan with a view of him adopting the traditionalist principles. According to the Carlist political leader Manuel Fal Conde the solutions advanced in the memorandum were tantamount to "liquidar nuestra existencia, cancelar un siglo de sustentación de verdad".

There is no follow-up known and it seems that Amezúa decided to remain loyal to Fal and Don Javier, yet he apparently withdrew into the back row; there is no information on his party activities in the late 1940s and the early 1950s. Though a member of the highest scientific institutions of early Francoism, Amezúa did not engage in the regime politically. He remained the advocate of dynastic reconciliation and Don Juan as the future Carlist king. In 1955 he met Don Javier when the regent briefly stayed in Madrid. When in early 1956 the claimant visited Spain and resided in San Sebastían, Amezúa travelled there, met him and once more endorsed the Juanista option, apparently with the regent increasingly leaning towards it.

== Reception and legacy ==
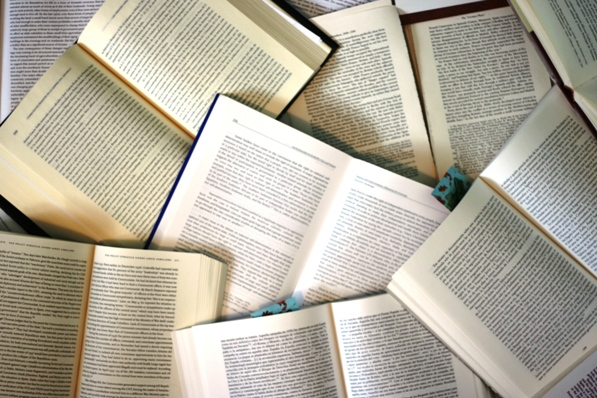

In the 1910s and 1920s Amezúa was known only by a limited circle of El Siglo Futuro readers and by some scholars of literature. He gained nationwide recognition upon his 1929 entry to the Real Academia de la Lengua, which was acknowledged in a number of major press titles. However, until the outbreak of the Civil War he was not a nationwide acknowledged public figure. It was only upon his entry to the Real Academia de Historia and the Real Academia de Jurisprudencia y Legislación in the mid-1940s that he became “uno de los prohombres de la intelectualidad franquista”, one of the top intellectuals of early Francoism. His funeral was attended by many distinguished personalities including the president of the RAE, Ramón Menendez Pidal; obituary notes were written by – among others - Ramón Menéndez Pidal, Ramón Pérez de Ayala, and Gregorio Marañón.

Since the 1960s Amezúa was gradually falling into oblivion. None of his works has been reprinted. Today they might be either briefly mentioned or merely footnoted in studies on Cervantes, Lope de Vega, Zayas, Quevedo, prints in old Spain or even more distant works on slavery and communication. His most important scientific contribution is supposed to be the term novela cortesana, the courtly novel, a category accepted and reproduced by present-day historians of literature; some even admit that it triggered an “astonishingly productive new direction in Golden Age studies, it has survived a half century of scrutiny and debate”. In historiography some scholars recommend his documentary compilations or works on Isabel de Valois.

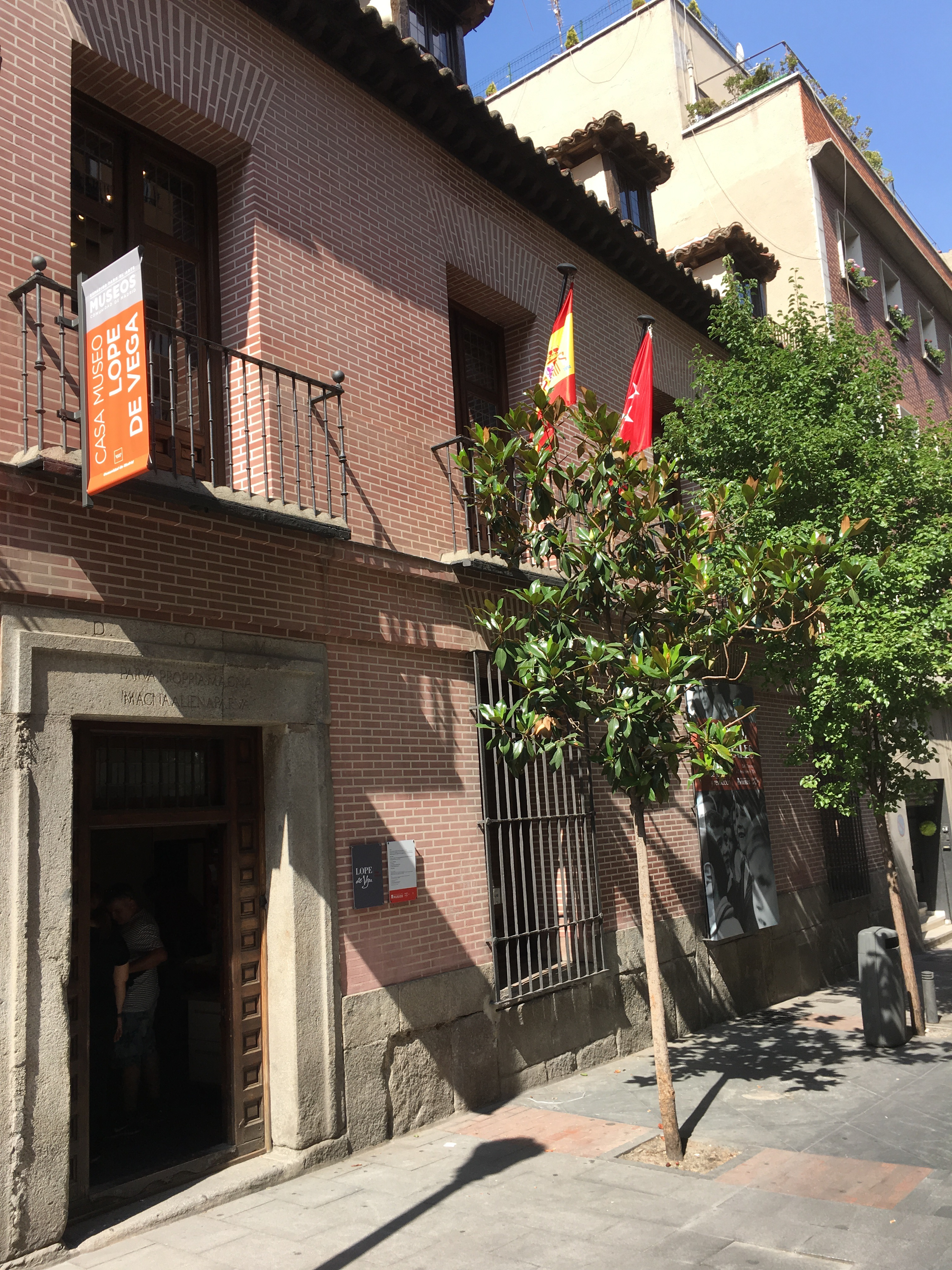
Lope de Vega house

Today González de Amezúa is dedicated short biographical notes on websites of the Real Academia Española, the Real Academia de la Historia and the Instituto de Estudios Madrileños. He has earned few brief monographs, apart from bibliographical queries, chiefly an article focused on his contribution to IEM. In Spanish public discourse he is rather absent; his memory was eclipsed by the personality of his children. If recalled, it is to emphasize the work of Antonio Rodríguez Moñino, a Republican who saved his library during the civil war. Some works referring to Amezúa's contribution of historian of literature stigmatize him as an anti-Semite or a machista. An American scholar lambasted him as “crítico fascista”, who, driven by his own personal experience – especially the Catholic upbringing and the Jesuit college frequented – entirely misrepresented Cervantes and focused on marginal threads of his works and lifetime, e.g. the Valladolid spell; he does not spare damning qualifications like “fascist”, “catolicismo jesuita de Amezúa” or “crítico bajo el techo del franquismo”. Few works note him as a protagonist of Carlism in the early Francoist era. In Madrid there is a large plaza named after him, though there were attempts to rename it in line with the Historical Memory Law. In 2026 a large set of his articles, preceded by a brief biographical introduction, was published by Universidad de Jaén.

== See also ==
- Carlism
- Integrism (Spain)
- Traditionalism (Spain)

== Footnotes ==
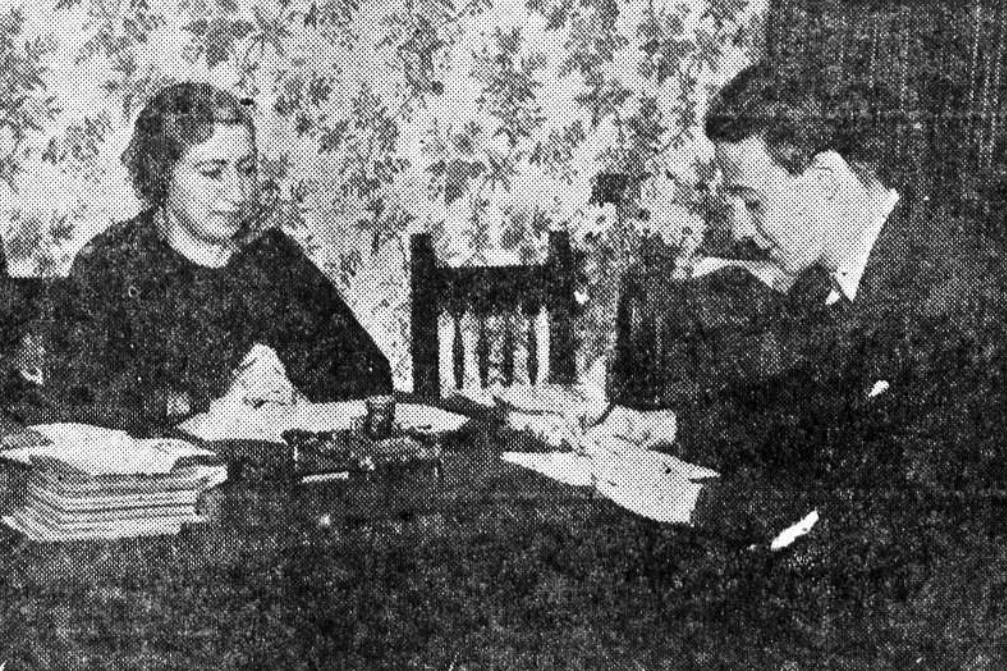
son Alvaro (killed in 1936) interviewing Urraca Pastor
