= City of Eternal Spring =

City of Eternal Spring may refer to the following cities:

- Addis Ababa, Ethiopia - elevation 2,355 m; Köppen climate classification Subtropical highland Cwb
- Arequipa, Peru - elevation 2,329 m; Cold desert (semi-arid) BWk
- Arica, Chile - elevation 0 m; Hot desert (arid) BWh
- Caracas, Venezuela - elevation 900 m; Tropical savanna Aw
- Cidra, Puerto Rico - elevation 580 m; Humid subtropical (highland) Cfa
- Cochabamba, Bolivia - elevation 2,560 m; Subtropical highland Cwb
- Cuernavaca, Mexico - elevation 1,630 m; Monsoon-influenced subtropical Cwa
- Da Lat, Vietnam - elevation 1,500 m; Subtropical highland Cwb
- Dali, China - elevation 1,963 m; Subtropical highland monsoon Cwb
- Jarabacoa, Dominican Republic - elevation 520 m; Tropical savanna Aw
- Kunming, China - elevation 1,900 m; Subtropical highland Cwb
- Medellín, Colombia - elevation 1,495 m; Tropical savanna Aw
- Quito, Ecuador - elevation 2,850 m; Equatorial highland Cfb
- Santa Cruz de Tenerife, Spain - elevation 0 m; Hot-summer Mediterranean Csa
- Trujillo, Peru - elevation 30 m; Hot desert (arid) BWh
