= Juan de Torquemada =

Juan de Torquemada may refer to:

- Juan de Torquemada (cardinal) (1388—1468), Spanish cardinal and ecclesiastical author; uncle to Inquisitor, Tomás de Torquemada
- Fray Juan de Torquemada (c. 1562 – c. 1624), Spanish Franciscan friar, missionary and historian of the New World

== See also ==
- Torquemada (disambiguation)
