= Clara María González de Amezúa =

Spanish businesswoman, writer, and gastronome

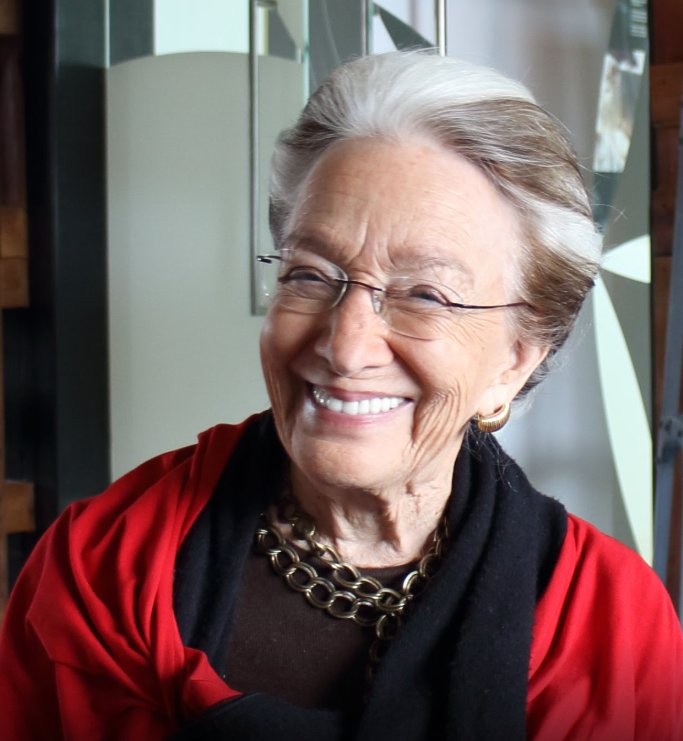
- Born: 26 December 1929; Madrid, Spain
- Died: 16 August 2024 (aged 94); Madrid, Spain
- Education: Le Cordon Bleu; L'École de Cuisine La Vereme
- Occupations: Businesswoman, writer, gastronome
- Spouse: Lino Llamas (m. 1956)
- Children: 8
- Parents: Agustín González de Amezúa (father); Primitiva Noriega González (mother)
- Relatives: Ramón González de Amezúa (brother)
- Awards: National Gastronomy Award (2015)

Clara María González de Amezúa Noriega (26 December 1929 – 16 August 2024) was a Spanish businesswoman, writer, and gastronome. She was the cofounder and owner of the kitchenware store and cooking school Alambique.

In 2015, the Royal Academy of Gastronomy presented her with its National Award for lifetime achievement.

== Biography ==
Clara María González de Amezúa was born into a well-to-do family in Madrid on 26 December 1929. Her father, Agustín González de Amezúa, was an intellectual who became president of the Royal Academy of History. Her brother Ramón was an organist and director of the Royal Academy of Fine Arts of San Fernando.

From a very young age, she knew she wanted to dedicate herself professionally to gastronomy. She learned to cook by reading authors such as Escoffier and spending two years observing the kitchen at Horcher. She later trained at Le Cordon Bleu Paris and L'École de Cuisine La Varenne. In 1970, on a trip to the United States, she discovered a store in New York where she could buy kitchen utensils which were unavailable in Spain at the time, such as garlic presses. This became the trigger for her decision to open a similar establishment in Madrid. She was also inspired by the shops of Elisabeth David, whom she knew from Williams Sonoma in San Francisco. She used her father's inheritance to start Alambique (Tienda y Escuela de Cocina) with three partners: Helena Lind, Giuliana Calvo Sotelo, and the Valencian editor Amparo Soler.

== Alambique S.A. ==
Launched in 1975, Alambique Tienda y Escuela de Cocina became the pioneer kitchenware store in the Spanish market. It remains in its original location. González later took exclusive ownership of Alambique by buying out the other partners.

Once the store was launched, her next step was to launch a cooking school whose first teachers were its members, featuring classes on paella, Italian, and Nordic cuisine. A connoisseur of French cuisine, González sought to contribute to the training of Spanish chefs by bringing renowned French chefs to teach at her school while their restaurants were closed for the winter. These included Laurent Tarridec in 1983 and 1984, Alain Ducasse in 1984 and 1985, Alain Gigant from 1985 to 1991, and Claude Maison D'Arblay from 1993 to 1997. This led to the dramatic rise of Alambique as a cooking school. "People realized that these were real classes, something important," she later reflected. The school's alumni and instructors include Darío Barrio, Alberto Chicote, Juanjo López Bedmar, Abraham García, Ángel León, María José San Roman, María Marte, Magda Gessler, Paco Roncero, Ricardo Sanz, Benjamín Urdiain, Pepe Rodríguez, and Samantha Vallejo-Nágera.

== Ambassador of Spanish cuisine ==
Throughout her career, González supported the diffusion of Spanish cuisine and products, working with the Ministry of Agriculture, Institute for Foreign Trade, and the International Olive Oil Council. With the latter, she spent 18 years promoting the virtues of extra virgin olive oil produced in Spain, and for several decades she organized and selected chefs to represent Spanish cuisine in different countries, editing the menus that were prepared. She also advised and supported young chefs such as José Andrés.

== Personal life ==
González married Lino Llamas in 1956, and they had eight children.

She died in Madrid on 16 August 2024.

== Awards and recognition ==
- 1983 & 2015 – National Gastronomy Award for Lifetime Achievement in 2015
- 2006 – Food Arts Silver Spoon Award for the difusion of Spanish Gastronomy
- 2008 – AMAVI Award to Women in Gastronomy
- 2017 – ACYRE Lifetime Achievement Award
- 2017 – Círculo de Orellana 1st Lifetime Pin
- 2018 – Community of Madrid Gastronomy Lifetime Achievement Award
- 2025 – Mujeres En Gastronomia (MEG) Posthumous Lifetime Achievement Award

== Publications ==
- Yo, tú, el, ella cocina [I, You, He, She Cook] (in Spanish). Castalia. 1964. ISBN 9788470392122.
- The Regional Cooking of Spain. Castalia. 1980. ISBN 9788470393532.
- Mis primeros pasos en la cocina [My First Steps in the Kitchen] (in Spanish). Temas de Hoy. 1987. ISBN 9788417432928.
- From Spain with Olive Oil. Asolva. 1988. ISBN 9788440433329.
- La cocina mediterránea y el aceite de oliva [Mediterranean Cuisine and Olive Oil] (in Spanish). ACK Servicios de Comunicación. 1990. ISBN 9788487687006.
