= María Marte =

Dominican chef (born 1978)

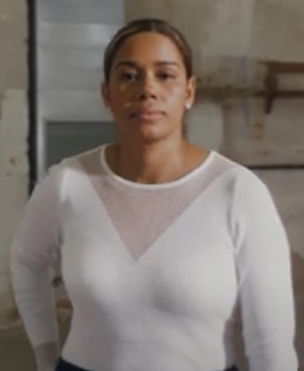
- Born: December 22, 1978 (age 46); Jarabacoa, La Vega, Dominican Republic
- Culinary career
- Award won: See § Awards and recognitions
- Website: elcluballard.com

María Marte (born December 22, 1978) is a Dominican chef who works in Spain. She is the only female chef in Madrid with two Michelin stars, as head chef of "El Club Allard".

== Early life ==
María Marte was born in the town of Jarabacoa, Dominican Republic, in 1978. Her interest in cooking began during childhood, where instead of playing with a toy kitchen, she cooked real dishes for her friends. After training in a bakery, influenced by her mother, she decided to move to Spain, a country she considered "the cradle of gastronomy".

== Career ==
In 2003, newly arrived from the Dominican Republic, Marte got a job cleaning dishes at "El Club Allard" in Madrid. Her arrival at the restaurant coincided with the arrival of head chef Diego Guerrero. At first, this work was combined with another, as a hairdresser, which kept her away from the kitchen, but allowed her to make a living for herself and her family.

Marte took advantage of her work as a dishwasher and watched the cooks, to learn from them. Hearing of a vacancy in the kitchen, she asked the head chef if she could be promoted. After not being allowed to move up the first time, she asked again once there was another opening. Given an opportunity this time, she began to work with Guerrero, doing food preparation and cleaning. Every day, she would arrive at work in the morning and start cooking, at 4:30 in the afternoon start scrubbing, and at 8:30 would cook again, because the dinner shift would be in full swing. In interviews, she explained that she had started to sleep in the stairway to keep up with the rhythm.

After three months, head chef Guerrero said he had to find someone else to wash the dishes because Marte "was worth the kitchen." From there, she was promoted more, and in 2006, became the second in command. In 2007, the restaurant got its first Michelin star, which was an incentive for Marte to work harder. In 2011, they were awarded the second star. During these years, Marte worked in all parts of the kitchen: bakery, fridge, meat and fish. Thanks to this, she acquired experience which she used as now-head chef, after the departure of Guerrero in 2013.

Her story of overcoming obstacles has not gone unnoticed to the press, which generally gives her very good reviews. In the newspaper El País, they write about "a Cinderella Michelin"; the magazine Diez Minutos describes her as a "fighter"; Elle writes of her "triumph of constancy"; El Correo considers her a "brave and self-made woman with a story of a story".

With Guerrero's departure, she feared for the future of the two Michelin stars the restaurant had acquired. The change of chefs was in the 2014 guide, and had been printed, so that although the head chef had changed, the restaurant's stars remained. In the following autumn came her reevaluation, and the inspectors considered Marte to deserve both stars. She explained that it felt "like winning two stars at once."

Marte says the way she cooks is to present "creative dishes", but "without transgressing or disguising the product". Her first new recipe at "El Club Allard" was Flor de Hibiscus, a caramelized hibiscus flower with pisco sour foam on a pistachio crumble. The plate proved to be a success, and was so important to her that she has its image as a tattoo.

== Awards and recognitions ==
- Two Michelin stars (2007, 2011)
- Two M's in Guía Metrópoli (2010)
- Two Repsol Suns (2011)
- Metrópoli Restaurant of the Year (2012)
- TripAdvisor Travelers' Choice Award (2012)
- Mahou-Millesime Best Restaurant of the Year (2012)
- Salón de Gourmets Best Chef Award (2015)
- Recognition from the Dominican Ministry of Tourism and National Association of Hotels and Restaurants at the International Fair of Tourism (2015)
- Star from the Community of Madrid on International Women's Day for Effort and Dedication (2015)
- National Gastronomy Award for the Best Head Chef (2014)
