= House-Museum of Lope de Vega =

- Casa-Museo de Lope de Vega (Spanish)
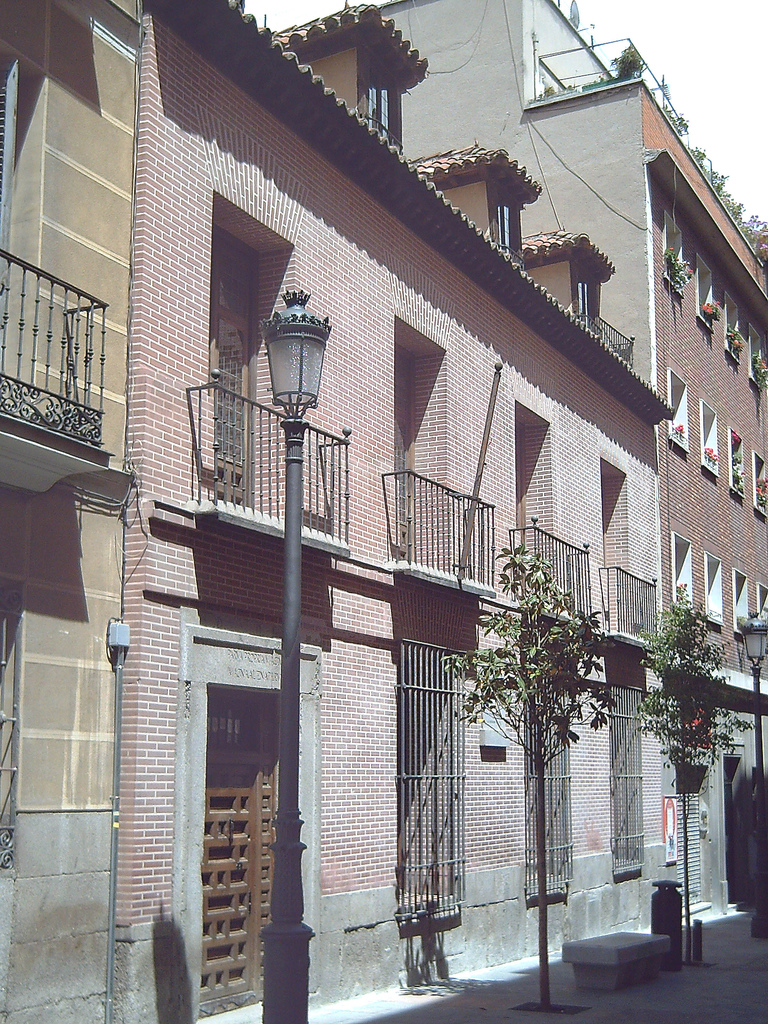

- Location within Spain
- 40.414338°N 3.697664°W
- Location: Madrid, Spain

Spanish Cultural Heritage
- Official name: Casa-Museo de Lope de Vega
- Type: Non-movable
- Criteria: Monument
- Designated: 1935
- Reference no.: RI-51-0001087

The House-Museum of Lope de Vega (Spanish: Casa-Museo de Lope de Vega) is a writer's house museum in the former home of the "golden age" writer Lope de Vega, located in Madrid, Spain.

The sixteenth-century house was bought by the writer in 1610. In 1930 it was purchased by Real Academia Española, the institution responsible for the regulation of the Spanish language. Under the guidance of Agustín González de Amezúa y Mayo the Academy restored the house and opened it as a museum in 1935, the same year the building was declared a national monument. The building is currently protected as a Bien de Interés Cultural. The Academía owns three of Lope de Vega's manuscripts on display at the museum.
