= St. Mary of the Gospel Monastery =

Church in Jarabacoa, Dominican Republic

Coordinates: 19.082°N 70.676°W

The St. Mary of the Gospel Monastery is located just six kilometers from the mountain town of Jarabacoa, La Vega, in the Dominican Republic.

The monastery is inhabited by a small community of Cistercian monks devoted to making food from soft wheat semolina, sugar and powdered milk. The monks also operate a monastic gift shop and an artisan bakery. Following monastic traditions, their work covers the expenses of their community life and goes to help the needy. The monks at the monastery cultivate personal holiness, are educated in faith and share experiences of prayer alongside laypeople who are trained in lectio divina and other Cistercian practices. The monastery also has a small guesthouse with a capacity of six people for those seeking an experience of meditation and prayer.

The St. Mary of the Gospel Monastery was established in 1989 by a group of Cistercian monks from the St. Mary of Viaceli Abbey in Alfoz de Lloredo in Spain. The monastic community began permanent residence in the monastery in 1996. The monastery was raised to simple priory 21 January 2006, and due to an increasing movement of Cistercian laypeople, may be on its way to becoming an abbey.
