= Torquemada =

Torquemada may refer to:

== People ==
- Juan de Torquemada (cardinal) (1388–1468), Spanish cardinal and ecclesiastical writer
- Tomás de Torquemada (1420–1498), prominent leader of the Spanish Inquisition
- Antonio de Torquemada (c. 1507–1569), Spanish writer
- Fray Juan de Torquemada (c. 1562–1624), Spanish friar, missionary and historian of the New World
- Edward Powys Mathers (1892–1939) (pseudonym Torquemada), British crossword setter

== Fiction ==
- Alonzo Torquemada, a character on the HBO drama series Oz
- Horatio Torquemada Marley, Elaine Marley's grandfather in the Monkey Island series
- Las novelas de Torquemada, four novels by Spanish author Benito Pérez Galdós:
  - Torquemada en la hoguera (1889)
  - Torquemada en la Cruz (1893)
  - Torquemada en el purgatorio (1894)
  - Torquemada y San Pedro (1895)
- Torquemada (play), an 1869 poem and an 1882 play by Victor Hugo about the life of Tomás de Torquemada
- Torquemada (comics), the main villain (Tomás de Torquemada) from the comic strip Nemesis the Warlock in the British comic 2000 AD
- Torquemada, a member of the Green Lantern Corps in the DC Comics universe
- Torquemada, a fortress in the 2010 video game Red Dead Redemption
- Señor Torquemada, horloger de Tolède, the Clockmaker in Ravel's opera L'heure espagnole

== Places ==
- Torquemada, Palencia, Spain

== Music ==
- "Torquemada 71", a song by doom metal band Electric Wizard
- Torquemada, a vocal piece composed by Leonardo Balada
