= Antonio de Torquemada =

Spanish writer (1507-1569)

- Born: 1507; León, Spain
- Died: 1569 (aged 61–62)
- Writing career
- Language: Spanish
- Genres: Fiction, non-fiction

For other people with this surname, see Torquemada

Antonio de Torquemada (circa 1507, León, Spain - 1569), was a Spanish writer of the Renaissance.

He studied humanities in Salamanca. Between 1528 and 1530 he lived in Italy and he was secretary of the Count of Benavente.

He composed popular works that were translated in France, Italy and England. His Coloquios satíricos are developed in a pastoral frame, that is an advance to the pastoral literature. Two of his famous works, Don Olivante de Laura and Jardín de Flores curiosas were mentioned by Miguel de Cervantes in the first part of Quijote. His complete works were published in the '90s in Madrid.

== Work ==
- Obras completas, Madrid: Turner, 1994-1997.
- El Ingenio, o juego de marro, de punto, o damas (Earliest known book about checkers, Valencia, 1547) - Lost, however a mysterious reference in Pedro Ruiz Montero’s 1591 book (“Otra que viene a ser tabla, aunque está en el libro que se imprimió en Valencia antiguamente, y la pone ganada, y yo hallo que es tabla sin ningun remedio por lo qual lo daré a entender”) may be citing this book.
  - José Antonio Garzón Roger (2010). Luces sobre el Ingenio, el pionero libro del juego llamado marro de punta, de Juan Timoneda. Centro Francisco Tomás y Valiente, UNED Alzira-Valencia. ISBN 978-84-92885-008.
  - Govert Westerveld (2015-08-26) El Ingenio ó Juego de Marro, de Punta ó Damas de Antonio de Torquemada (1547). ISBN 978-1-326-40451-2 228 pages. According to this book it is questionable that the term “Damas” was part of Torquemada’s original title (11).
- Coloquios satíricos (Mondoñedo, 1553)
- Don Olivante de Laura (Barcelona, 1564) - A book of cavalries
- Jardín de Flores curiosas (Salamanca, 1570)
- Manual de escribientes (1574) - For secretaries
