= Sanchorreja =

- municipality
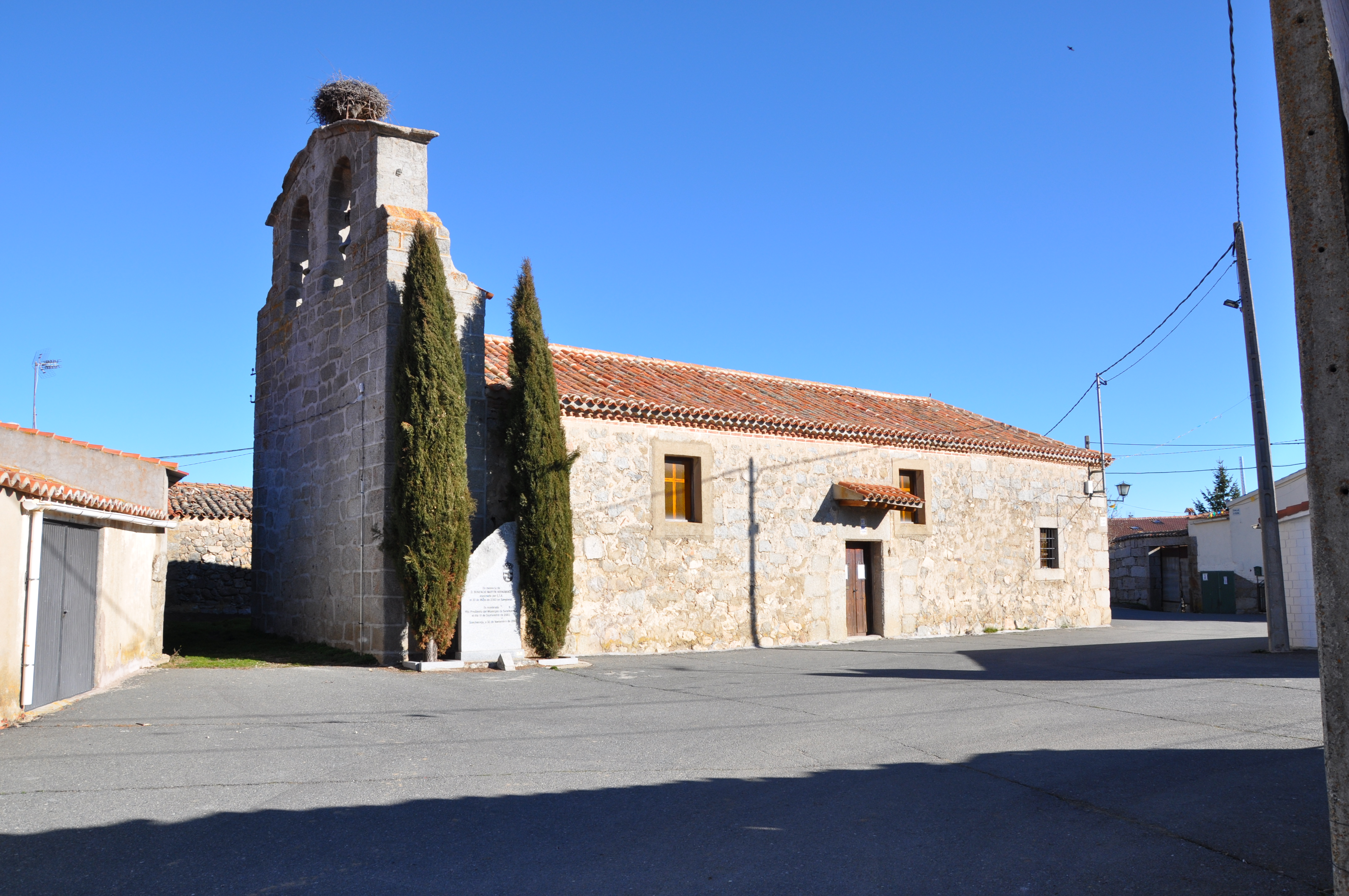
- San Martín Church

- Flag Coat of arms

- Location in Spain. Sanchorreja (Spain)
- Coordinates: 40°39′53″N 4°54′55″W
- Country: Spain
- Autonomous community: Castile and León
- Province: Ávila

Area
  - Total: 35 km^{2} (14 sq mi)

Population (2025-01-01)
  - Total: 77
  - Density: 2.2/km^{2} (5.7/sq mi)
- Time zone: UTC+1 (CET)
  - Summer (DST): UTC+2 (CEST)
- Website: Official website

Sanchorreja is a municipality located in the province of Ávila, Castile and León, Spain.

== Population ==
Historical population
Year	Pop.	±% p.a.
2023	80	—
2024	79	−1.25%
2025	77	−2.53%
Source: INE
