= Trams in Madrid =

Tram system

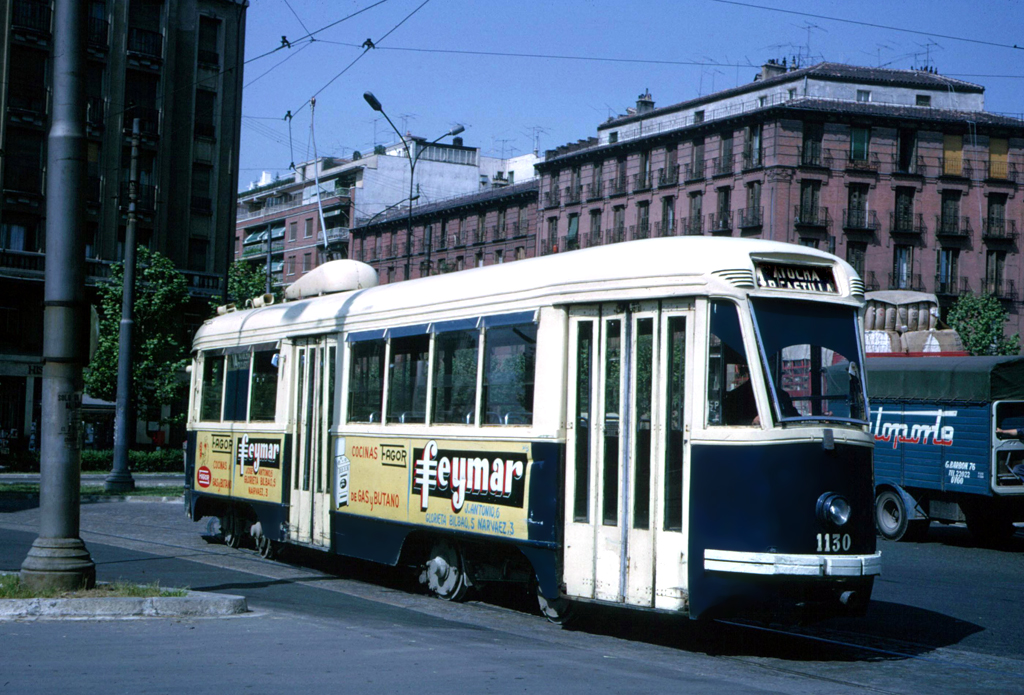
Spanish-built Fiat/PCC running in Madrid in 1969

The Madrid tramway network is a network of tramways forming part of the public transport system in Madrid, the capital of Spain.

Parts of the network include(d):

- The historical street-running tramway network in central Madrid, functioning between 1871 and 1972.
- The Metro Ligero de Madrid, a tramway network of three lines, which began operations in 2007.
- The Parla Tram, a circular line in suburb south of Madrid, inaugurated in 2007.
