= Jarabacoa =

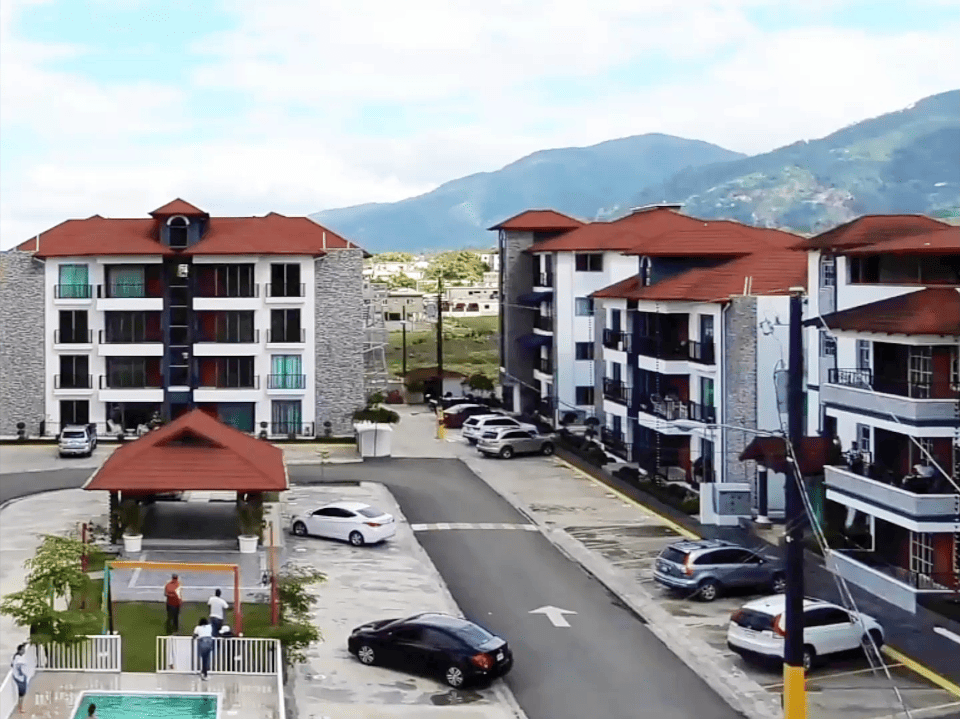
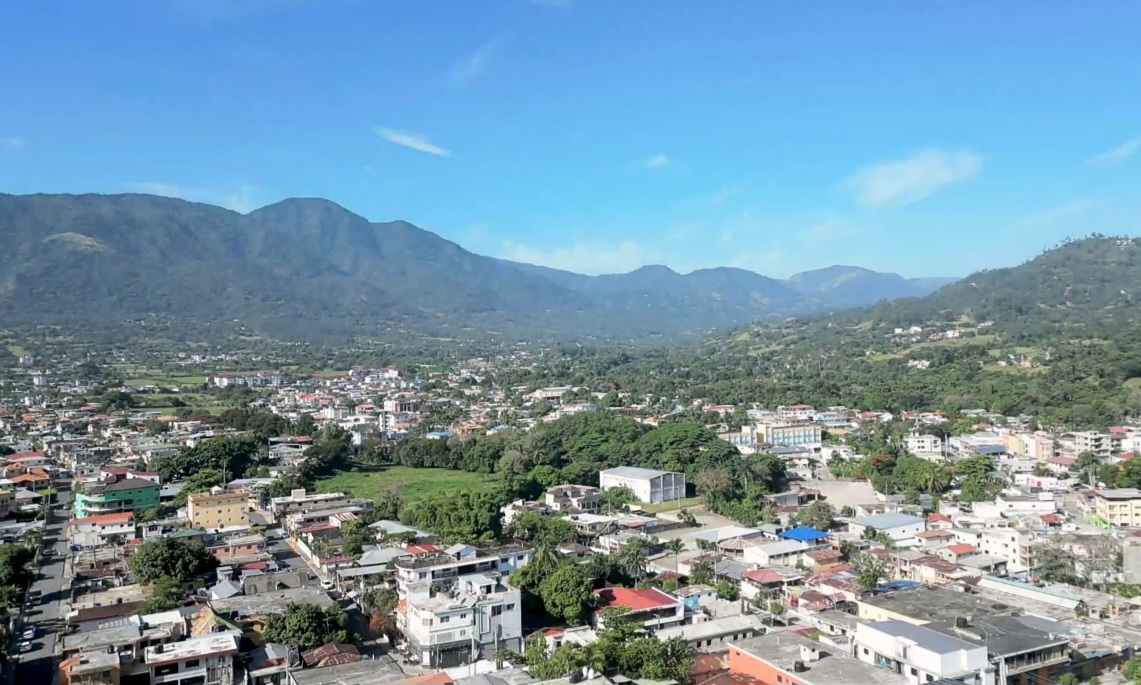
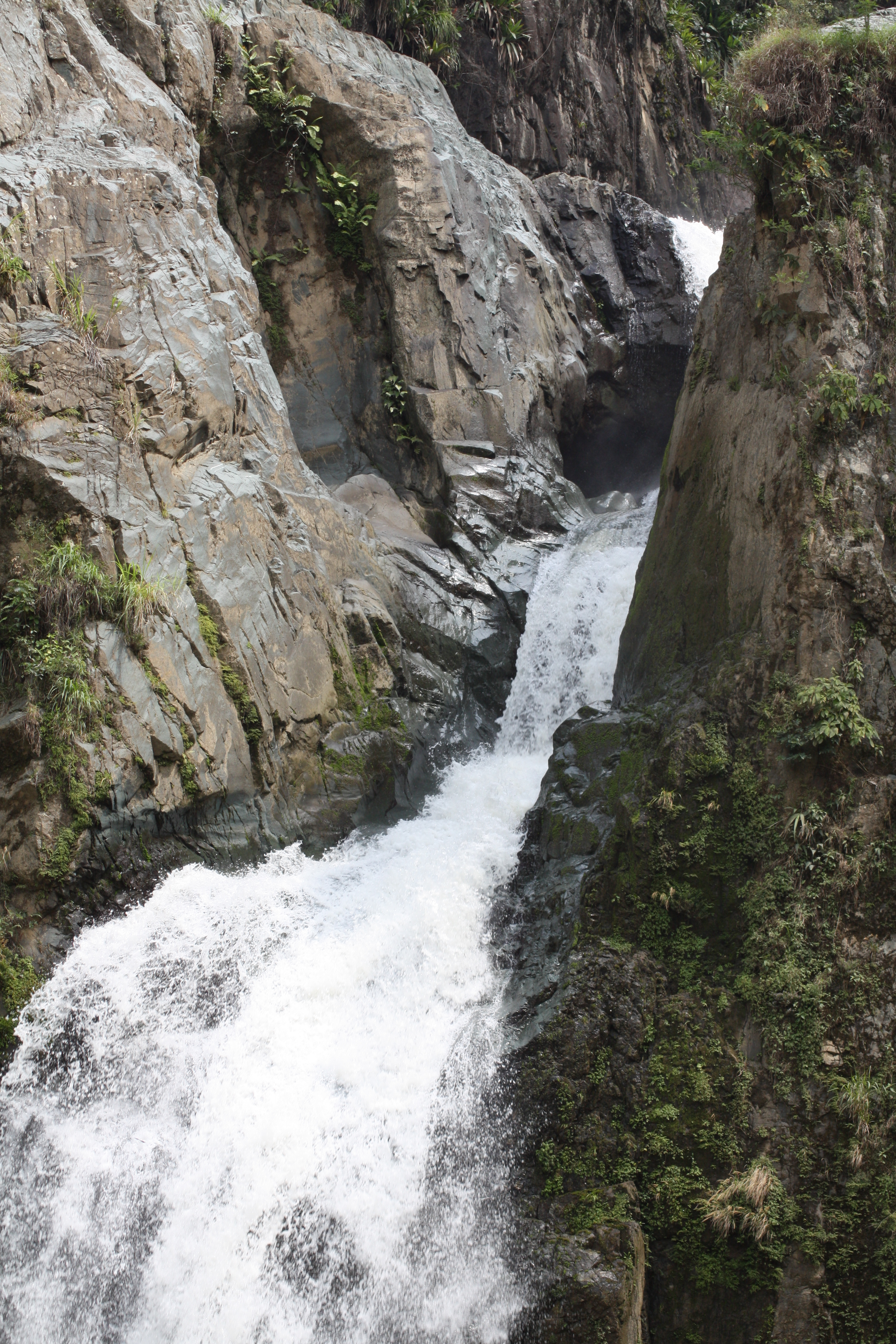
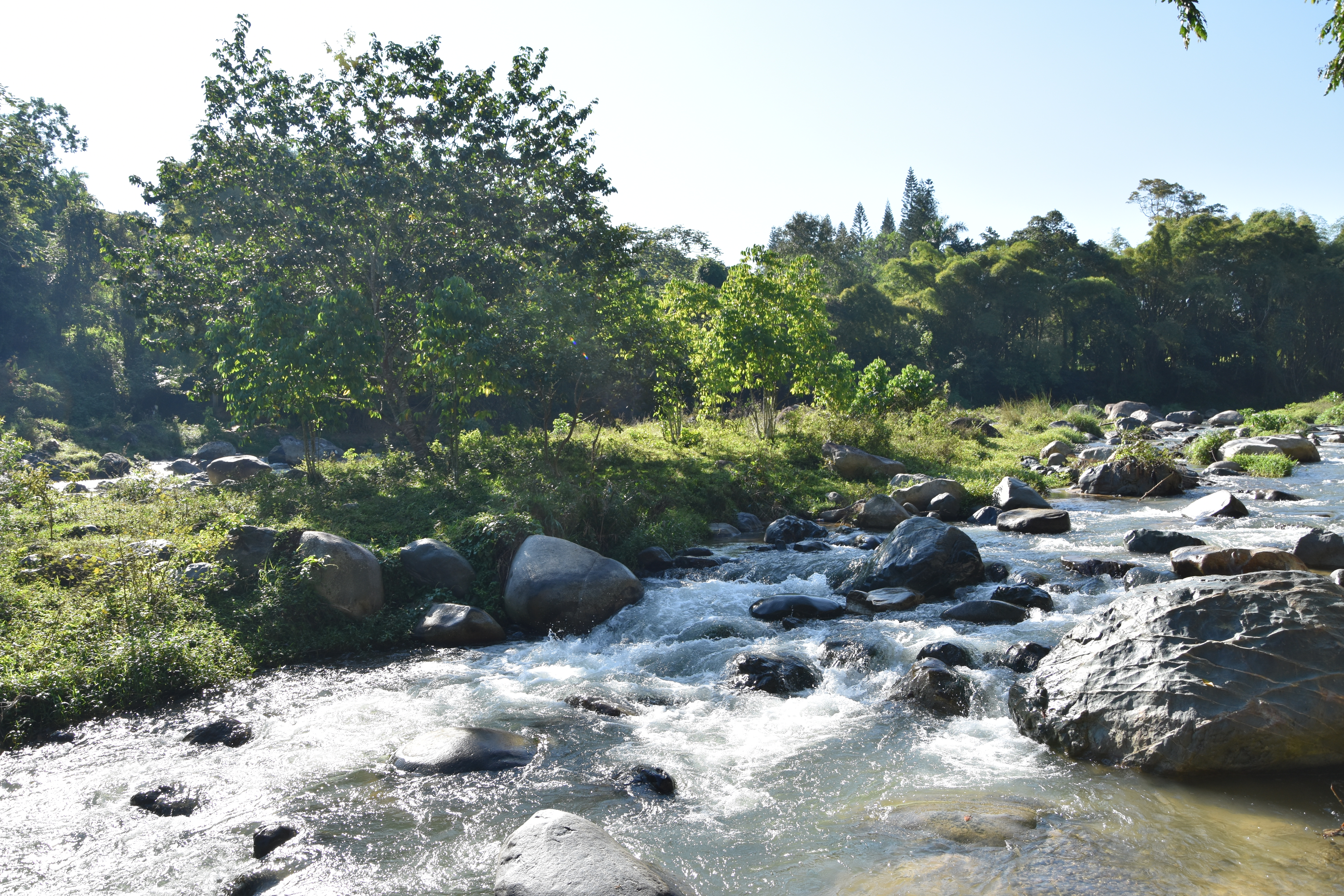
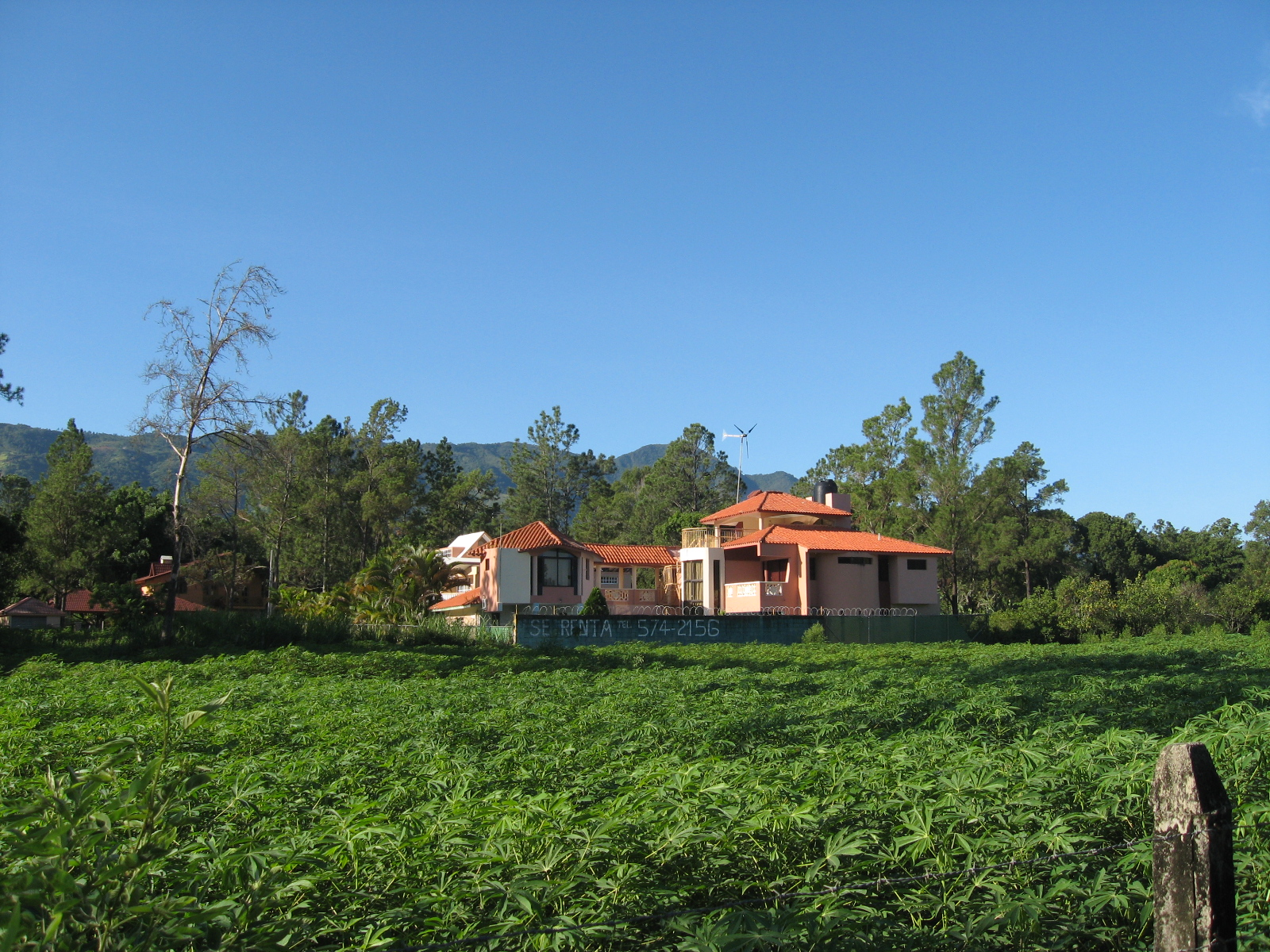
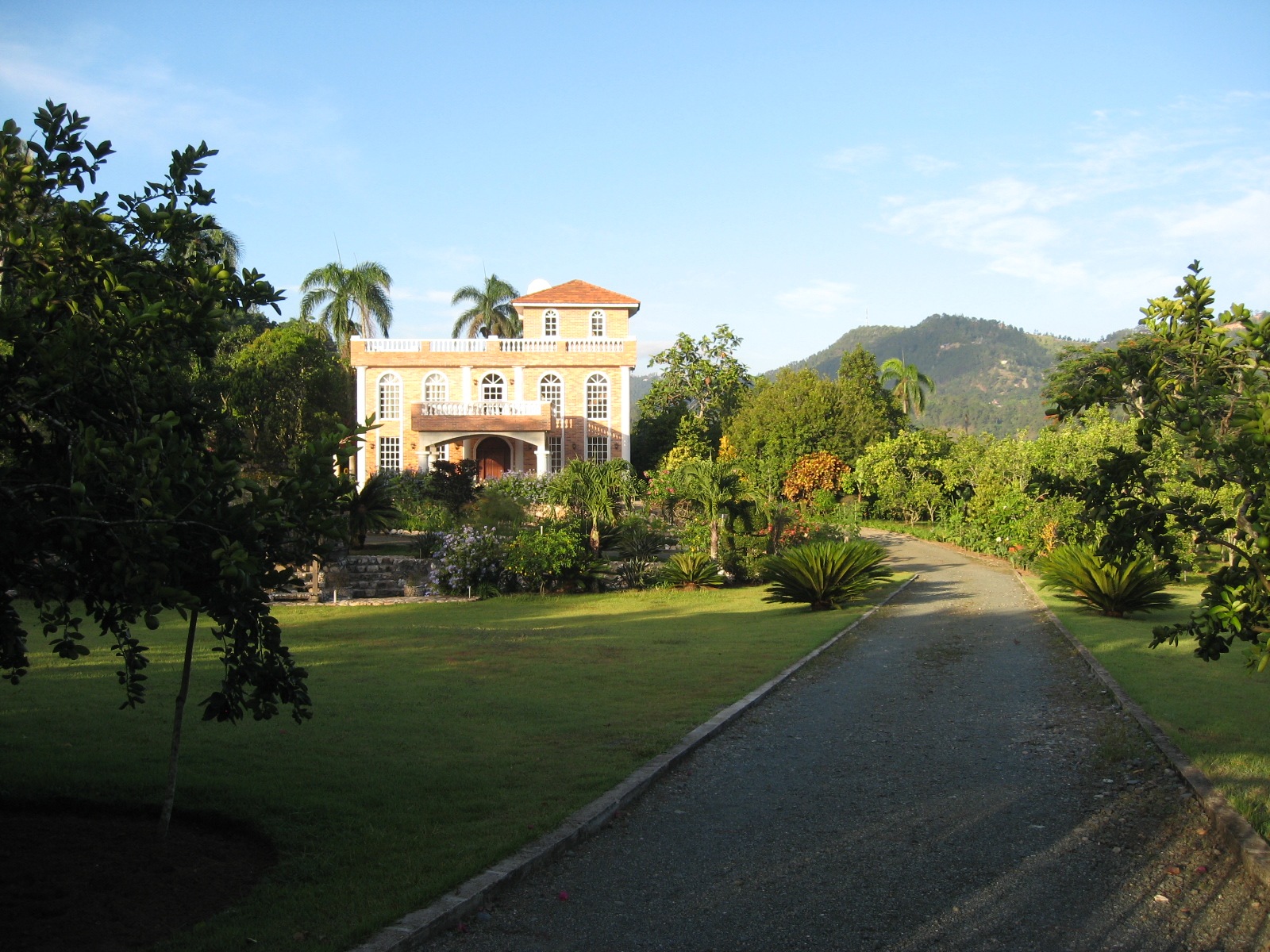

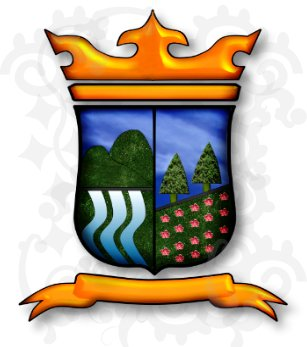
- Coat of arms

- Location within the Dominican Republic
- Coordinates: 19°7′12″N 70°38′24″W
- Country: Dominican Republic
- Province: La Vega

Area
  - Total: 665.88 km^{2} (257.10 sq mi)
- Elevation: 529 m (1,736 ft)

Population (2012)
  - Total: 69,855
  - Density: 104.91/km^{2} (271.71/sq mi)
  - Urban: 68,585
  - Demonym: Jarabacoense
- Distance to – Santo Domingo: 155 km
- Municipal Districts: 2
- Climate: Af

Jarabacoa is a town located in the central region of the Dominican Republic. It is the second largest municipality in La Vega Province.

== History ==
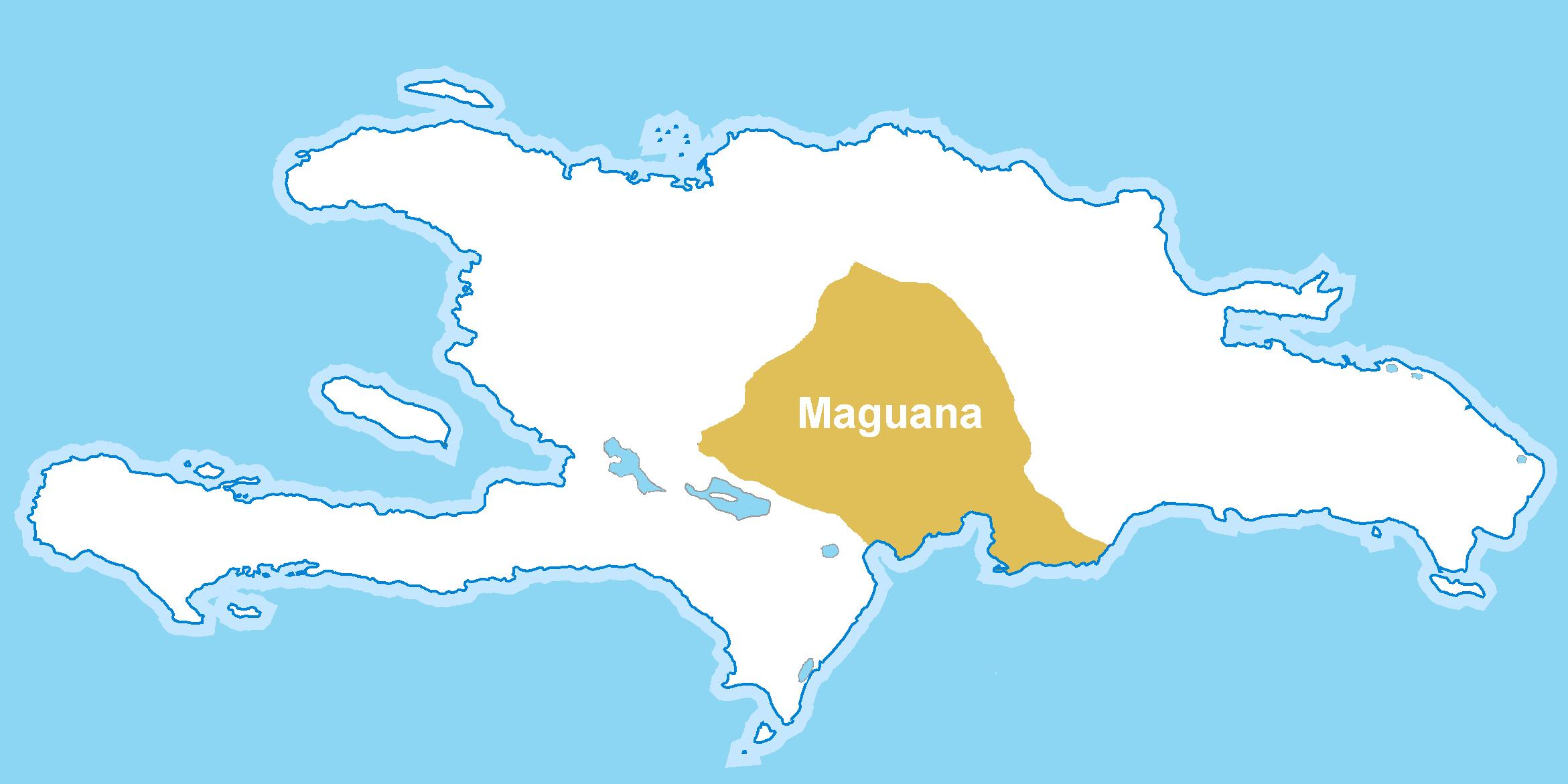
Chiefdom of Maguana

The indigenous Taino people originally inhabited the valley of Jarabacoa. It is assumed that the town's name was formed out of the words 'Jaraba' and 'Coa', meaning "Land of Waters" in the Taíno language. The Spanish conquistadors made it to Jarabacoa in their search for gold, but later abandoned the expedition due to violent resistance by the natives in the area, to this day gold can be washed from some of the many rivers. Jarabacoa most likely belonged to the Chiefdom of Maguana making it part of the kingdom of Cibao.

During the colonization period, the Spaniards settled in Jarabacoa working in mines and later established some cattle herds. At the end of the 1700s there were several Spanish families living in Jarabacoa. The area experienced its greatest population growth at the beginning of the 1800s from whites who migrated from other parts of the island after the slave revolts in the French colony of St. Domingue. It had a population boom in 1805 as many landowners came to the area in the mountains of the Central Range and settled in the valley of Jarabacoa. These ethnic groups remain prominent today. Indigenous ancestry is also present in higher than average rates due to higher indigenous survival through isolation.

In 1854, a military post was established and the town was formally founded due to its strategic position in the communication between the Cibao and the South. On September 27, 1858, the town was incorporated as a municipality. Its inhabitants stood out as brilliant soldiers in the Dominican war against Haiti. Such are the cases of General José Durán and also General Norberto Tiburcio.

Four years later, Jarabacoa was elevated to the category of Common by decree of President Pedro Santana, on September 27, 1858, and by Royal Order of the Spanish Ministry of War dated June 26, 1862, the Jarabacoa Military Command was created.

== Geography and climate ==
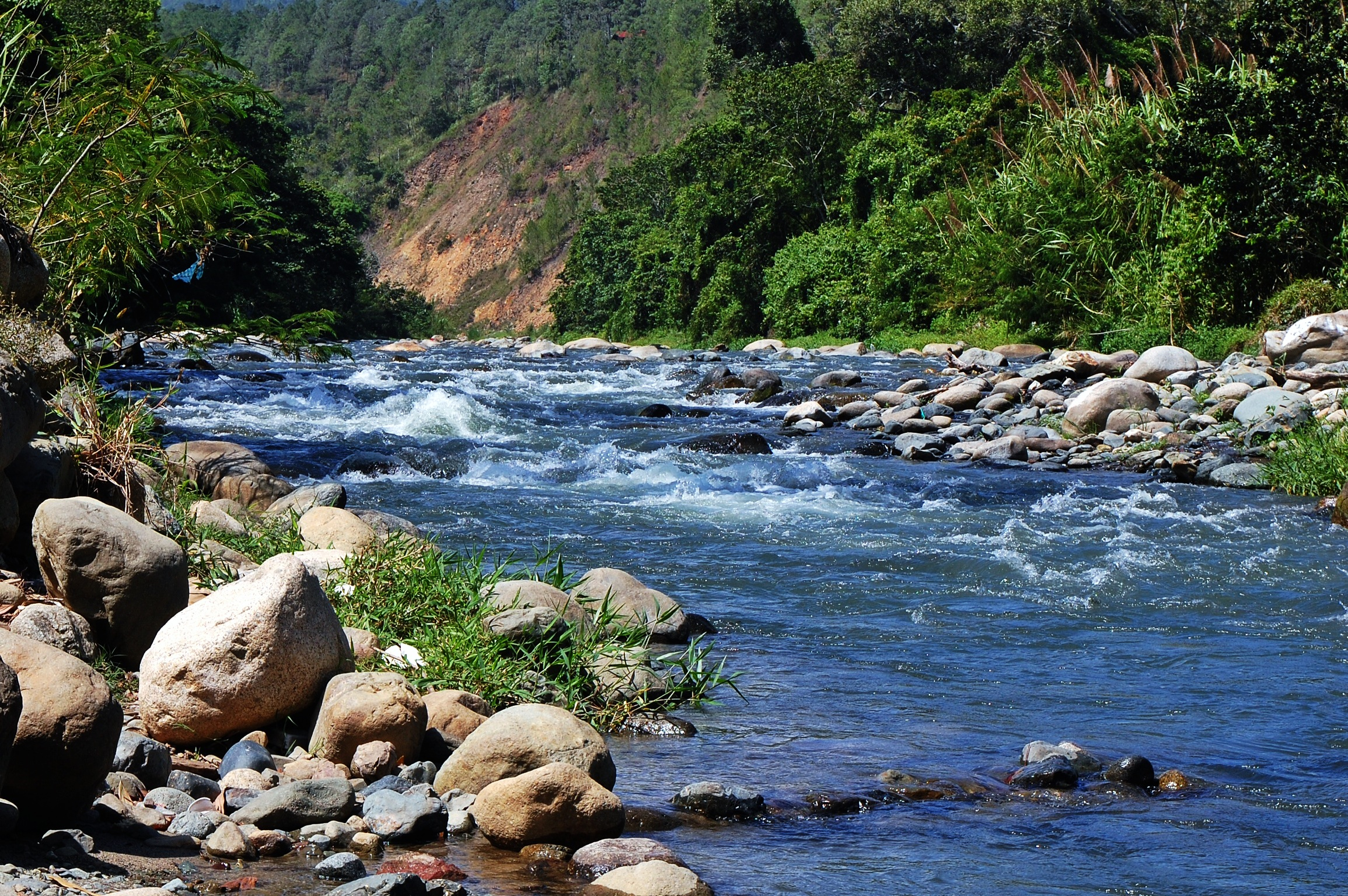
La Confluencia, Jarabacoa

Jarabacoa has a Tropical rainforest climate (Köppen climate classification Af ). Due to its high elevation in the interior it has warm days and lower temperatures at nights during most of the year, and temperate days and colder nights during winter months. Because of its climate, visitors have christened Jarabacoa as "The City of Everlasting Spring". Rain is abundant during most all the year.

One of the main touristic attractions is the mountains and natural environment of the area due to its location in the center of the Central Range. It is also one of the main access to the Pico Duarte and the Ebano Verde Scientific Reserve. Jarabacoa has three large rivers, Baiguate, Jimenoa and the Yaque del Norte, the last two merge in the Confluencia, continuing on as the Yaque del Norte, the second largest river in the country.

The coldest temperature ever recorded was 7.1 °C (44.8 °F), on 24 February 2012.

Climate data for Jarabacoa (1971-2000)
Month	Jan	Feb	Mar	Apr	May	Jun	Jul	Aug	Sep	Oct	Nov	Dec	Year
Record high °C (°F)	34.4 (93.9)	36.1 (97.0)	35.6 (96.1)	34.4 (93.9)	35.0 (95.0)	37.8 (100.0)	38.3 (100.9)	36.0 (96.8)	36.0 (96.8)	34.0 (93.2)	33.0 (91.4)	30.0 (86.0)	38.3 (100.9)
Mean daily maximum °C (°F)	25.4 (77.7)	26.0 (78.8)	27.0 (80.6)	27.6 (81.7)	28.3 (82.9)	29.8 (85.6)	29.9 (85.8)	30.0 (86.0)	29.8 (85.6)	29.0 (84.2)	26.8 (80.2)	25.3 (77.5)	27.9 (82.2)
Daily mean °C (°F)	20.0 (68.0)	20.5 (68.9)	21.3 (70.3)	22.1 (71.8)	23.0 (73.4)	23.9 (75.0)	24.0 (75.2)	24.1 (75.4)	23.9 (75.0)	23.4 (74.1)	22.0 (71.6)	20.5 (68.9)	22.4 (72.3)
Mean daily minimum °C (°F)	14.6 (58.3)	14.9 (58.8)	15.6 (60.1)	16.6 (61.9)	17.6 (63.7)	17.9 (64.2)	18.1 (64.6)	18.2 (64.8)	17.9 (64.2)	17.7 (63.9)	17.0 (62.6)	15.6 (60.1)	16.8 (62.3)
Record low °C (°F)	—	7.1 (44.8)	—	9.0 (48.2)	—	—	—	12.4 (54.3)	—	—	—	—	7.1 (44.8)
Average rainfall mm (inches)	130.6 (5.14)	110.8 (4.36)	112.3 (4.42)	163.3 (6.43)	210.7 (8.30)	88.4 (3.48)	89.4 (3.52)	155.5 (6.12)	137.2 (5.40)	158.6 (6.24)	194.2 (7.65)	153.9 (6.06)	1,704.9 (67.12)
Average rainy days	11	—	—	—	14	7	8	9	10	13	—	—	—
Source 1: National Bureau of Meteorology (ONAMET)
Source 2: Acqweather.com

== Economy ==
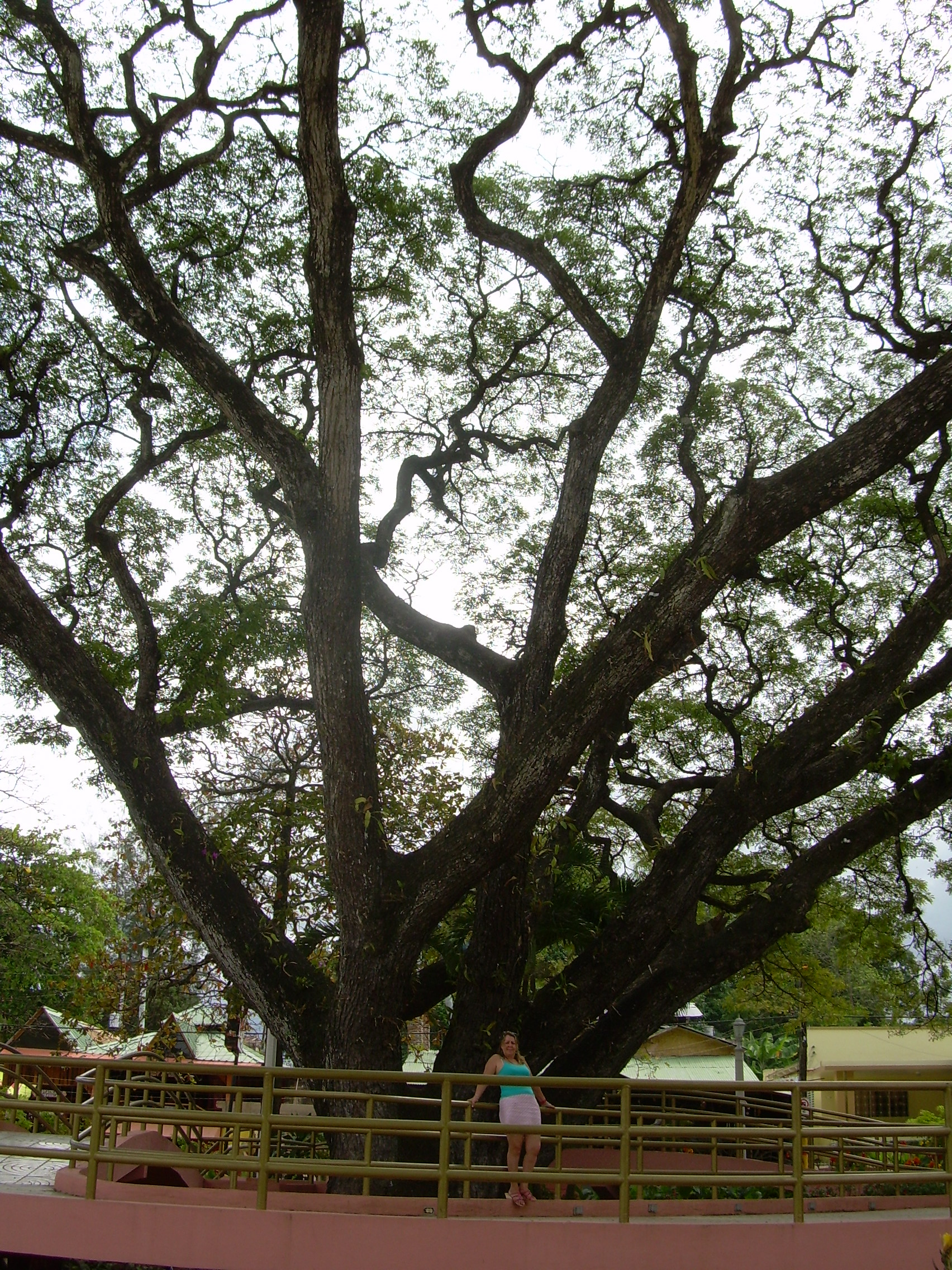
Jarabacoa park.

The local economy is based upon agriculture. It is known for its strawberries, coffee, pimento and ají pepper, the last two being grown in green houses. Jarabacoa is also known for its wide variety of flowers.

== Places of interest ==
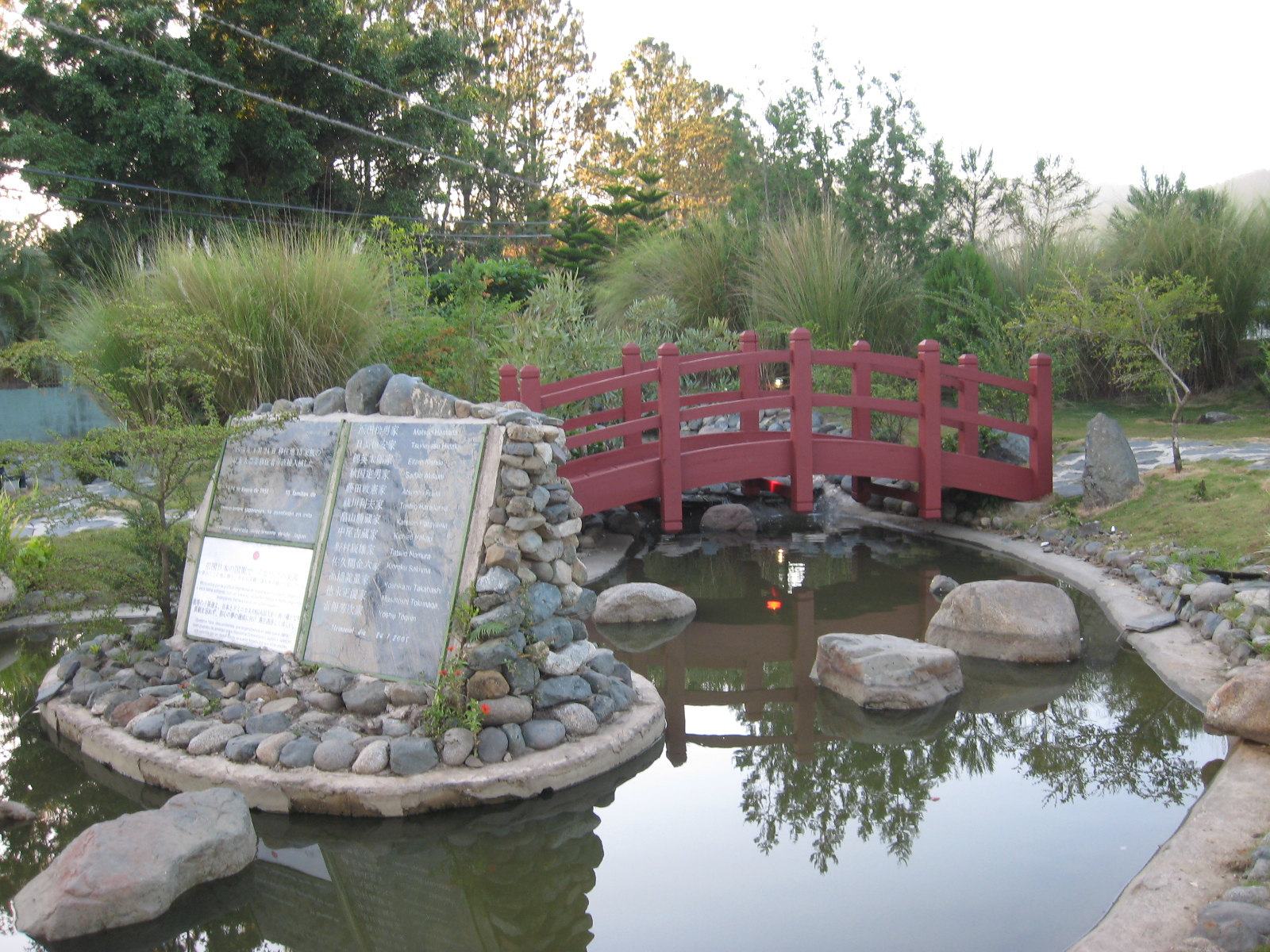
Jarabacoa Japanese park.

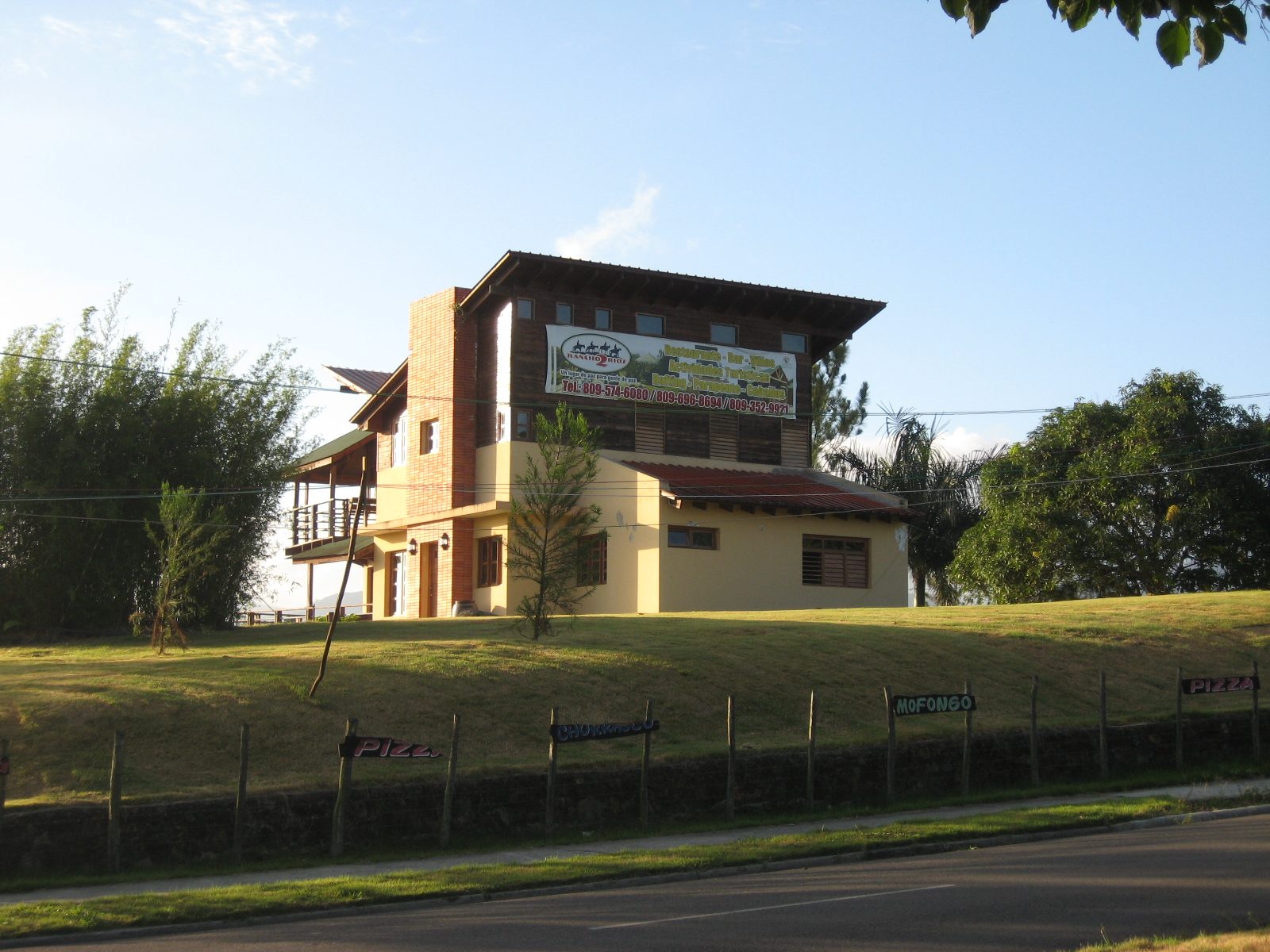
Jarabacoa rancho

- The forestry college "Universidad Agroforestal Fernando Arturo de Marino" http://uafam.edu.do/
- Colegio Salesiano, a salesian school with soccer and baseball fields, volleyball and basketball courts, academy, parroquial school, retreat center, medical dispensary.
- St. Mary of the Gospel Monastery (Monasterio de Santa María del Evangelio), Cistercian Monastery.
- Jimenoa Waterfalls, Baiguate Waterfall, Constanza Valley, Ébano Verde Scientific Reserve.
- Wooden footbridge over the Jimenoa river, impressive rope and wood construction. Crossing is recommended for those who enjoy extreme sports.
- Jarabacoa Mountain Village.
- Escuela Caribe, The facility shown in "Kidnapped for Christ".

== Culture ==
The local Carnival in February is one of the most famous in the country. The official website of the Carnival is www.carnavalJarabacoa.com On July 16 is celebrated the day of Our Lady of Mount Carmen. Every June, "Festival de las Flores" is held in Jarabacoa with many local vendors selling flowers, flowering plants and orchids, as well as hand-made crafts.

== Education ==
On January 10, 1997, opened the Universidad Agroforestal Fernando Arturo de Meriño, a small college that mainly offers majors related to agriculture and ecology. There is also the Eugenio de Jesús Marcano Ecological Centre.
