= Navarrese electoral Carlism during the Restoration =

Navarre

Carlism was the dominant political movement in elections in Navarre during the period between the Third Carlist War (ended 1876) and the Primo de Rivera dictatorship (began 1923). The movement, defeated in 1876, during the Restauración period recalibrated its focus from military action to political means and media campaigns. Accommodating themselves to political framework of the Alfonsine monarchy, party leaders considered elections, and especially elections to Cortes Generales, primary vehicle of political mobilization. Navarre turned out to be the Carlist electoral stronghold; it elected 35% of all Carlist deputies voted into the parliament during almost 50 years of the monarchical liberal democracy. Though the phenomenon remained marginal from the national Spanish perspective, political prowess of Carlism in the province was key to sustain its potential until the movement regained momentum during the Second Spanish Republic.

== Electoral system ==
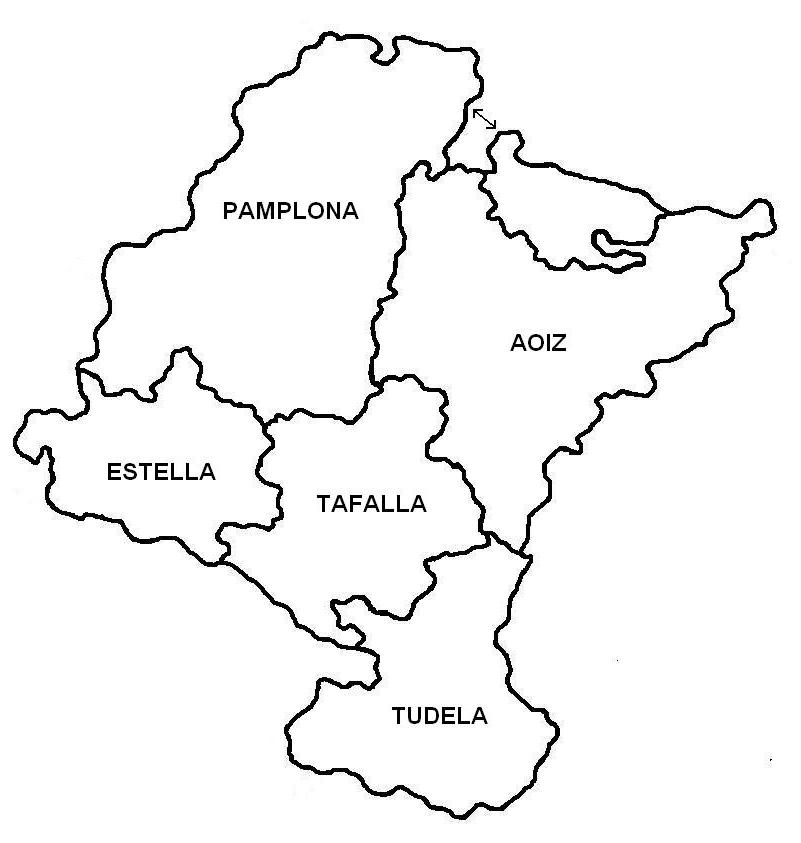
Electoral districts, 19th century

During the entire Restauración period Navarre was divided into 5 electoral districts, territorially roughly corresponding to the existing judicial districts; 4 of them (Estella, Aoiz, Tafalla and Tudela) were categorized as “distritos rurales” with one mandate each, and 1 (Pamplona) enjoyed the status of a “circunscripción” with 3 mandates available. In both types of districts mandates were assigned according to the first-past-the-post system. In the 20th century the comarca of Améscoas was moved from the Pamplona district to the Estella district.

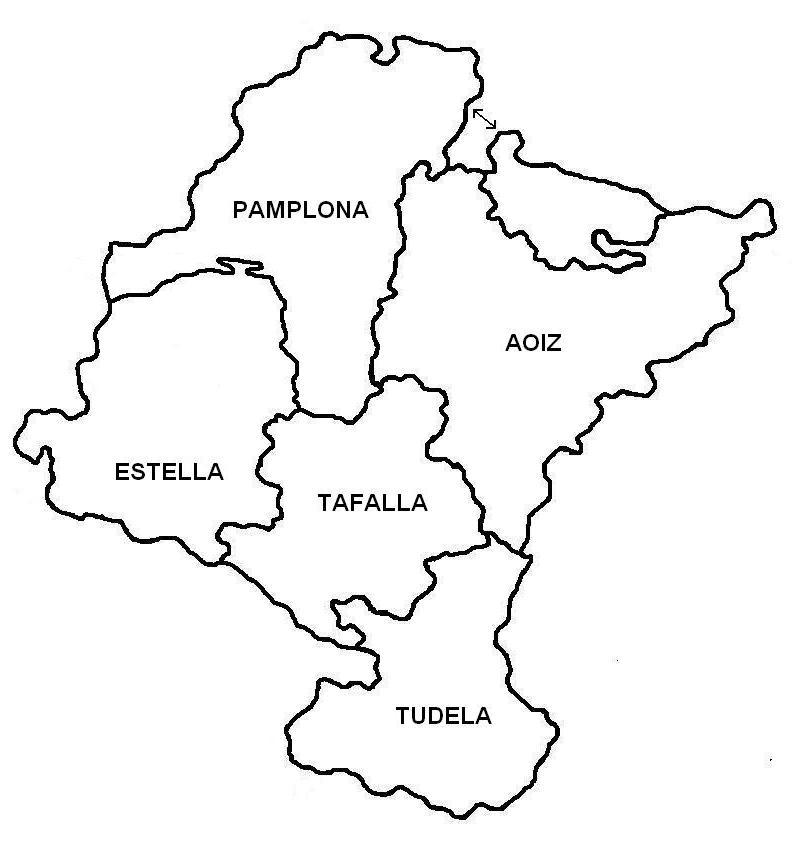
Electoral districts, 20th century

Until the 1886 elections the eligible voters (around 19.000, some 6% of the population) were males above 25 years of age with appropriate material status. Starting the 1891 campaign the rights were granted to all males above 25 years, which increased the number of potential voters to around 64.000 people (some 21% of the population).

Spanish elections of the Restauración are marked by 2 distinct features: turnismo and caciquismo. According to the turnista routine, elections were organized by one of two rotating pre-appointed parties, Conservatives and Liberals, to ensure their parliamentary majority; the objective was achieved by a wide range of electoral manipulations known as pucherazos. Caciquismo was the system of political corruption based on networks of local party bosses. In Navarre both features were in play, though their efficiency decreased over time and varied across the province, with countryside usually more prone to electoral fraud.

== Navarre and Spain ==
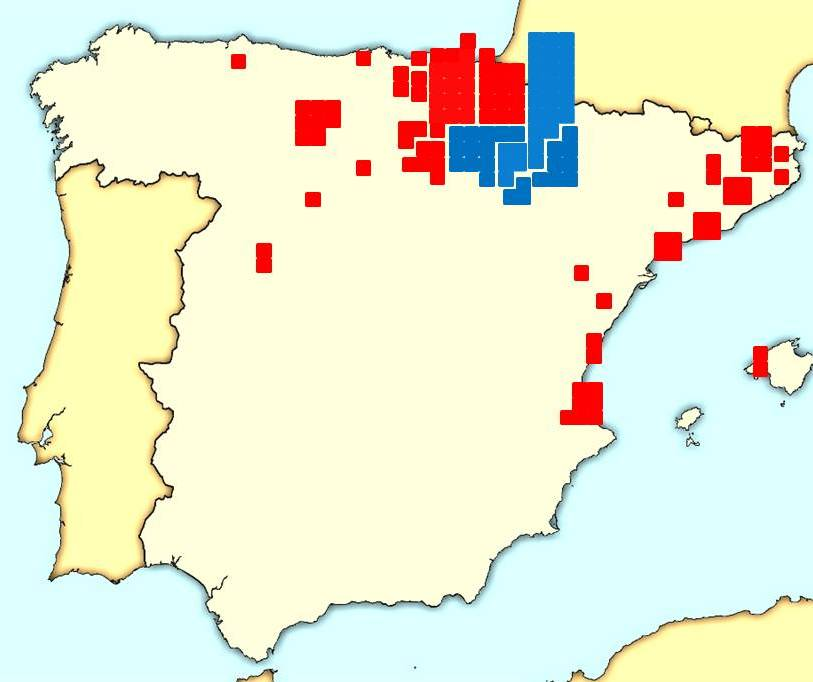
Carlist deputies. Navarre in blue

Navarre elected 35% (50 out of 144) Traditionalist deputies voted in during the Restauración, though the ratio varied across almost half a century in question. Through the 1880s the province was trailing behind with no mandate won, while single seats were occasionally conquered in Guipuzcoa, Álava and Vizcay. In the 1890s and from 1916 onwards Navarrese deputies to the Cortes formed some 30-40% of the entire Traditionalist minority. From 1903 to 1914 the Navarrese heavily dominated in the group of Carlist deputies, in 1906 constituting the record 67% (4 out of 6). In absolute figures the most successful were the years of 1907 and 1910, when Traditionalists grabbed 6 out of 7 Navarrese seats available; during these terms they formed 1,5% of all deputies (otherwise usually ranging between 0,8% and 1,2%).

As the province voted in 50 Carlist deputies altogether, in terms of the legitimist zeal no other part of Spain stood comparison. Speaking in terms of the then existing regiones, two were somewhat behind, Vascongadas electing 44 deputies and Catalonia 23 deputies. Old Castile and Valencia won 11 seats each, and 5 were scattered across Asturias, Leon and Baleares. Not a single seat has been won in the capital, Madrid.

With 22 MPs Pamplona is topping the list of Spanish electoral districts with the highest number of Carlist deputies voted in; though the next in line are two Guipuzcoan districts, Estella (12 MPs) comes fourth and Aoiz (8 MPs) is fifth. Tafalla (5 MPs) still makes it to top ten, while Tudela (3 MPs) takes place mid-range, ahead of 18 districts which one time or another elected 1 or 2 Traditionalist deputies. The highest rate of success measured as percentage of seats won out of all seats available was recorded by two districts in Guipuzcoa, with Estella coming third (65%), Aoiz fourth (40%) and Pamplona sixth (37%).

== Periodization ==
In terms of Carlist electoral history in Navarre, the era of 1879-1923 Navarre falls into 4 sub-periods, marked by different conditions, strategies, and above all, different results. The period of 1879-1890 produced almost total electoral absence, 1891-1902 were the years of ascendance, 1903-1917 provided the Carlists with total domination and 1918-1923 demonstrated gradual eclipse.

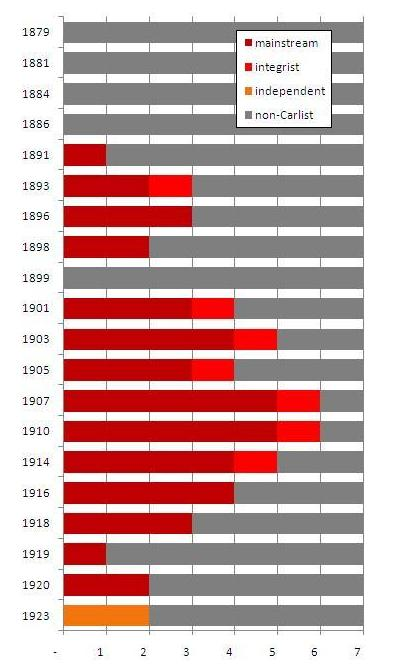
Navarrese deputies to Cortes

Military defeat suffered in 1876 paralyzed Carlist activities in the country, with press suspended, circulos closed and leaders exiled. Though structures of the party were being gradually rebuilt, until the late 1880s there were still neither Carlist electoral centers nor other comités organizados operating in Navarre. Their first daily, El Tradicionalista, appeared as late as 1886, and was replaced by La Lealtad Navarra in 1888. The party did not field any official candidates, though there were a few who demonstrated some sympathy for the Carlist cause. Carlists tested their own strength in elections to Diputación Foral starting late 1870, but were unsuccessful until the late 1880s. They first re-emerged as political group in local municipal elections, as in 1881 they were able to elect 8 concejales to the Pamplona ayuntamiento.

Starting late 1880s Carlism assumed a structured modern shape and the 1888 split of Traditionalism into mainstream Carlism and Integrism produced more aggressive policy of both groups. Though most 1891 candidates were easily defeated, the election of Sanz Escartín marked the beginning of Carlist march for later domination. In 1893 the mainstream Carlists improved to two seats, though Mella's victory was marginal, and the Integrist branch won one. The elections marked also decline of the Liberals. 1896 produced 3 seats. During the 1898 campaign the Carlists were probably overconfident; Sanz and Mella got their tickets confirmed, but Irigaray did not. In 1899 Carlos VII ordered abstention and called for boycott; no individual candidate joined the race. In 1901 the Carlists regained 2 seats in Pamplona and Estella, while Irigaray recorded the first victory in Aoiz.

During the 1903–1917 years both branches of Traditionalism won 29 out of 42 mandates available (69%) and the period is clearly marked by their supremacy. The only area beyond clear Carlist control was Ribera Baja, as in Tudela district they won only 2 out of 6 mandates. They emerged as an arbiter on the regional political scene, with other parties seeking their support. In many elections of that age opponents did not even bother to compete. The period is closed by the 1916 elections, when the Carlists changed alliance strategy in order to regain Tudela and Tafalla districts; they succeeded only partially.

The final phase falls on the years of 1918-1923. It is marked by disappearance of the Integrists and a strategy of pivotal tactical alliances at the expense of clear political line, which triggered internal conflict within mainstream Carlism. The strategy did not produce the results expected; the Mellista secession added insult to injury, and the rise of new Basque, republican and socialist parties contributed to electoral decline of Carlism. During the last campaign of the Restauración in 1923 Jaime III ordered abstention, quoting disillusionment with the corrupted democracy. Out of 4 Carlist-related candidates who decided to run individually, only 2 were elected.

== Program ==
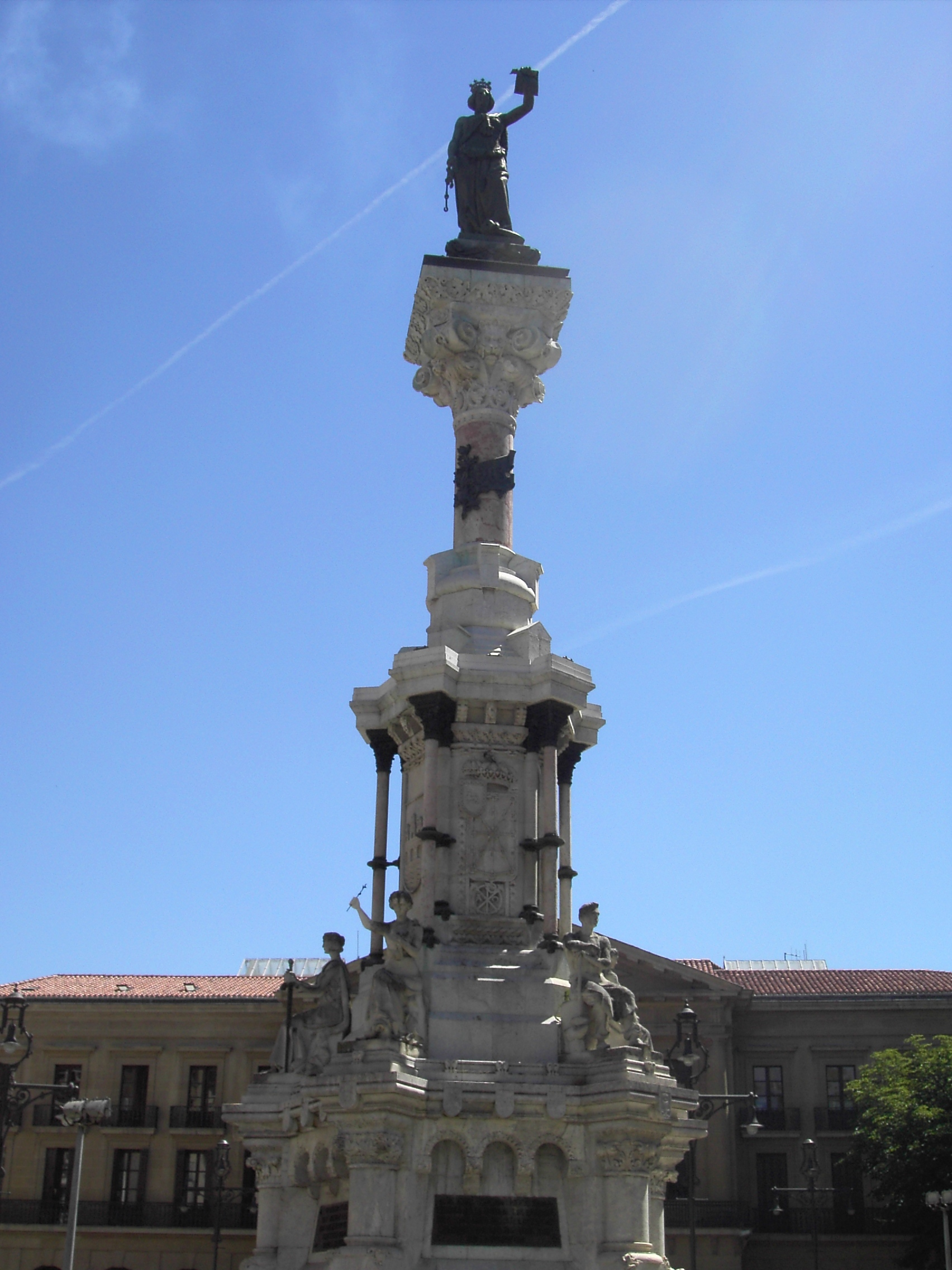
Fueros monument, Pamplona

Initially the Carlists preferred not to compete on a highly partisan, ideology-driven program. Instead, their propaganda was calibrated to prove that only Traditionalism would be a genuine representative of local and provincial interests in Madrid. It was the “Fueros” part of their ideario which was put on the forefront. The defense of local interests remained the single most constant feature of mainstream Navarrese Carlism electoral buildup, though even calls for restoration of the pre-1841 separate establishments have never amounted to endorsement of autonomous designs either for the province or for the broader Vasco-Navarrese region. The issue remained a thorny question during the Alianza Foral period in the 1920s, undermining the Carlists-Nationalist concord and even producing internal divisions within Carlism itself.

Another typical feature of Traditionalist propaganda were constant references to Christian values, with mainstream Carlists competing against other groupings of the Right – most prominently the Integrists – to obtain support from the Catholic hierarchy, and if that proved unfeasible, than at least to get their Catholic credentials confirmed one way or another. Following Congreso Católico de Zaragoza in 1890, all candidates running as “Catholics” strived to obtain authorization of the bishops; the Carlists tried to obtain such a license exclusively and criticized alleged abuse and inflation of the term, granted by the bishops even to Liberal candidates.

Carlist standard

In the 20th century the Carlist propaganda was increasingly saturated with diatribes aimed against political corruption (presented as inevitable consequence of liberalism), and even against the electoral system itself. Another rising current was defense of legitimism, though references to dynastical claims were usually veiled and the party tried to avoid open challenge of the Alfonsist rule. The campaigns of Carlist candidates, always ultra-conservative and anti-democratic, at the turn of the centuries became even more reactionary and included increasingly frequent calls to defend traditional values against “red revolution”. In the late 1910s and early 1920s, with the Carlist policy of pivotal alliances in full swing, they sidelined ideological threads. It was the Integrists who excelled in lambasting the Jaimistas for allying with the arch-enemies Liberals. Finally, the last years of Restauración were marked by outward rejection of the political system and “farsa parlamentaria”.

== Alliance policy: friends and foes ==
There was no concise, firm and continuous Carlist alliance policy during the Navarrese elections to the Cortes. The choice of friends and enemies stemmed from internal dynamics within Carlism in Spain, from political turns of the Carlist claimants, from local circumstances and from developments on the provincial and national political scene.

During the 1880s and most of the following decades the Liberals, victorious on the battlefields, remained the Carlist arch-enemies also at the polls. Refraining from fielding candidates themselves, the followers of Carlos VII sympathized with some Cortes hopefuls representing other groupings. One such group were the Conservatives; the most prominent of them was marqués de Vadillo, considered a semi-Carlist candidate and his cacique network occasionally dubbed carlo-vadillismo. Other friendly candidates were the Fueristas, a group centered on autonomous and Catholic program. With Carlist organization rebuilt, the electoral base of the Fueristas was gradually absorbed by the Traditionalists in the late 1880s.

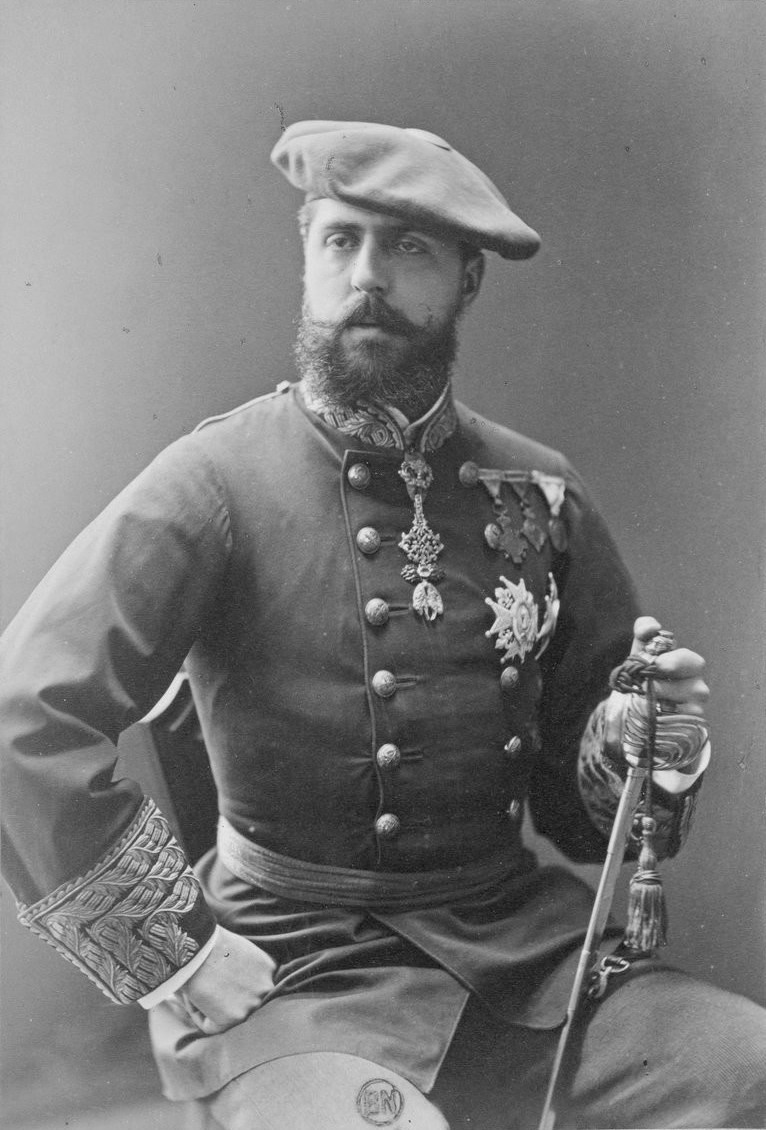
Carlos VII

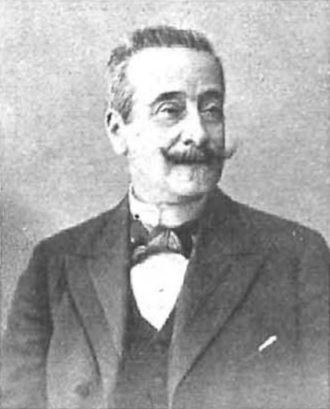
Ramón Nocedal

The 1888 split between the breakaway Integristas of Ramón Nocedal and the mainstream Carlism loyal to Carlos VII produced bitter rivalry between both factions. Though in Navarre initially the two groups considered mutual support of their men, they eventually fielded competitive candidates in 1891. During the 1890s both groups considered each other primary enemy and contended with venomous hostility. When the Integrists fielded no candidate (like in 1898) they refused to support any Carlist and even backed their opponents. The hostility turned into rapprochement in early 1899, when two factions agreed to co-operate in Guipuzcoa; the carlo-integrist alliance soon spread also to Navarre. In 1899 both branches boycotted the elections, and in later campaigns they worked together.

Since the beginning of the 20th century Carlists emerged as arbiter on the regional political scene, and other parties were competing with each other seeking their support. The most stable turned out to be the alliances with the Integristas and then the Mauristas, usually formed under a broad monarchist-Catholic-regional umbrella. As part of the deal, the three Pamplona mandates available were shared between a Carlist, an Integrist, and a Conservative, as the Carlist allies enjoyed the privilege of a “second vote”.

Around 1915 the Carlist alliance policy started to change, a result of complex haggling at local elections. In 1916 the Carlists altered their strategy and preferred Liberals to Integrists as alliance partners in order to regain the Tudela and Tafalla districts. The year marked also a new strategy of pivotal tactical alliances concluded at the expense of clear political line. The one which enraged many was a coalition with the Liberals. An agreement with the Nationalists, initially intended for local balloting but eventually applied to general elections, also raised many eyebrows. Finally, the Mellista secession divided Carlism further on.

== Geography ==
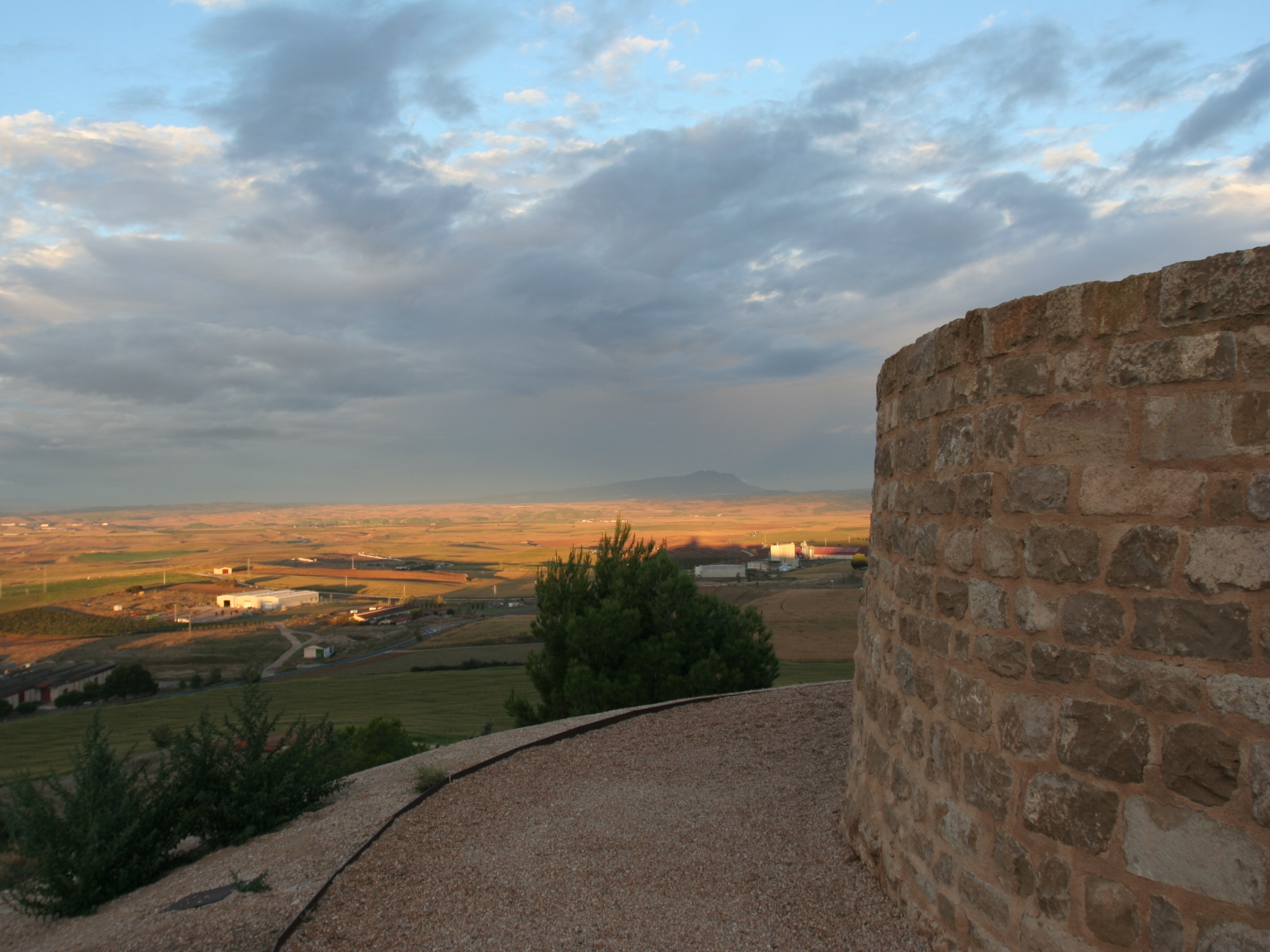
the core: from Artajona to Estella

Analysis of geographical distribution of Carlist support in Navarre reveals some general rules applicable through most of the Restauración period, though there were few shifting patterns traceable across specific parts of the province. In general, Carlism recorded the highest success ratio in the electoral district of Estella (won 60% of mandates available), followed by Aoiz (40%), Pamplona (37%), Tafalla (25%) and Tudela (15%).

Carlism enjoyed most support in the central zone of Navarre, covering the belt of Sierras Occidentales, Tierra Estella, Cuenca Pamplona, Navarra Media, Baja Montaña and partially Prepireneo, with the core formed by confluence of Pamplona, Estella and Tafalla districts, around Artajona, Mendigorría, Larraga, Val de Mañeru and Valdizarbe. A major change within this central zone was gradual deterioration of Carlist vote at the southern edge of the belt, in Ribera Estellesa, Northern municipalities of Ribera Arga and in Sierra de Ujué.

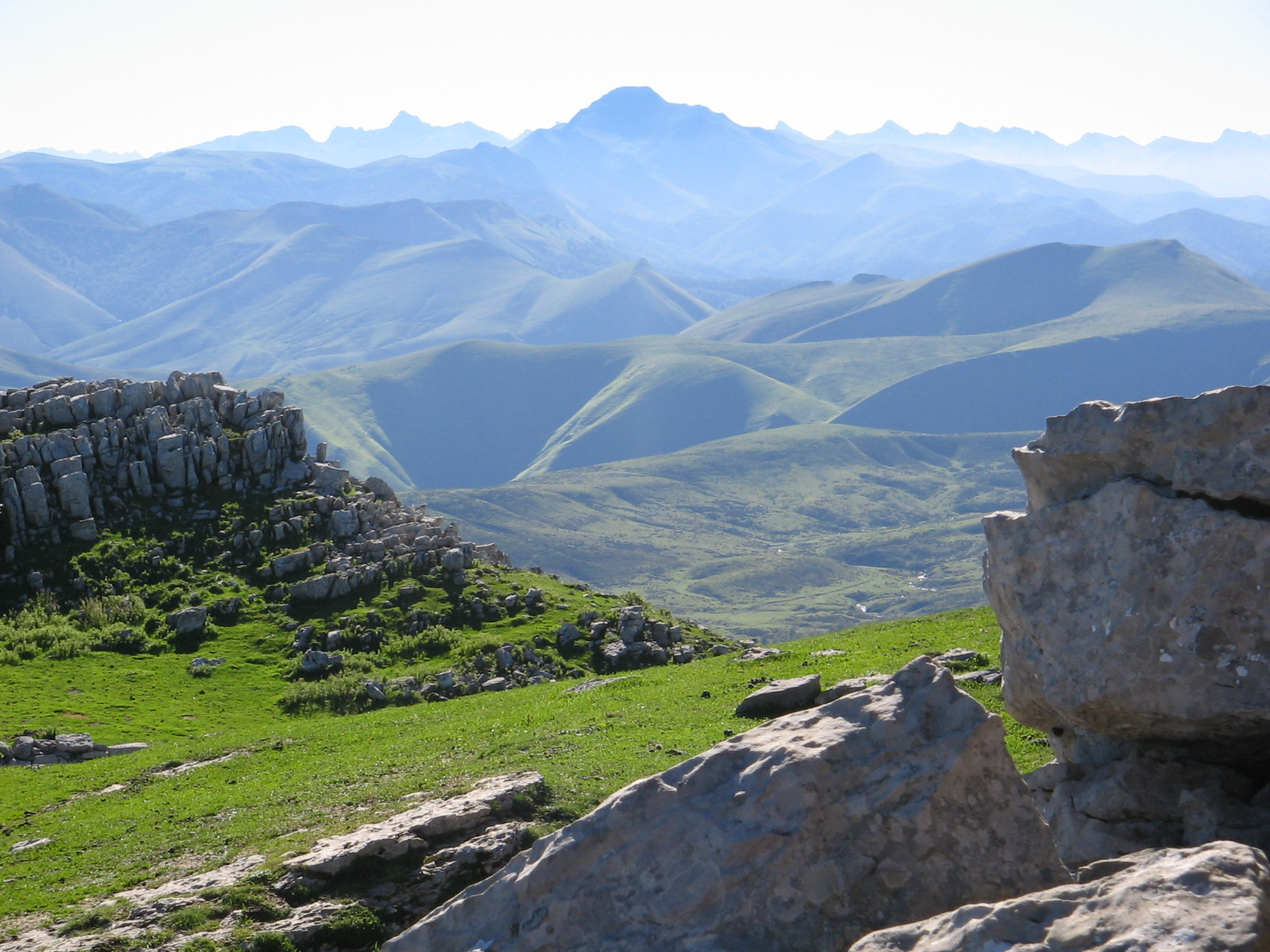
loose grip: Pyrenees

The city of Pamplona was in the early 1890s dominated by the Carlists, though by the end of the century their rivals shortened the distance and Sanz ceased to be the most popular deputy of the city; also de Mella later in the 20th century had to concede the first place to a Maurista candidate. The trend proved stable and at some point Carlism lost its grip on the capital, as in 1931 Pamplona was one of few places in Navarre where the Carlist-Nationalist coalition lost to the Left. The city of Estella witnessed the opposite pattern: initially Carlists suffered heavy defeats and conquered the city only in the early 20th century, to keep winning also during the overall democratic triumph of 1931.

The Northern belt of the province (Valles Cantábricos, Valles Meridionales, Precantabrico, Pirineos) was consistently less enthusiastic about Traditionalism. Until the late 1890s the movement fared rather badly in the mountains; in Pirineos Orientales, dominated by the Valle de Roncal based Gayarre caciques, the Carlists did not even bother to field a candidate. Over time they gained strength in Valles Meridionales, partially in Prepirineos and Pirineos Orientales, though their grip was less than firm. Corredor del Araquil, in the 1890s loyal to legitimist cause, was later conquered by the democrats. Valles Cantábricos remained the Integrist stronghold, though over time it was the Nationalists who set their foot in the area. In general, until the end of Restauración the Carlists did not dominate the Northern belt, and it was sparse population density of this hilly region which worked to their advantage when aggregating the vote in the districts of Pamplona and Aoiz.

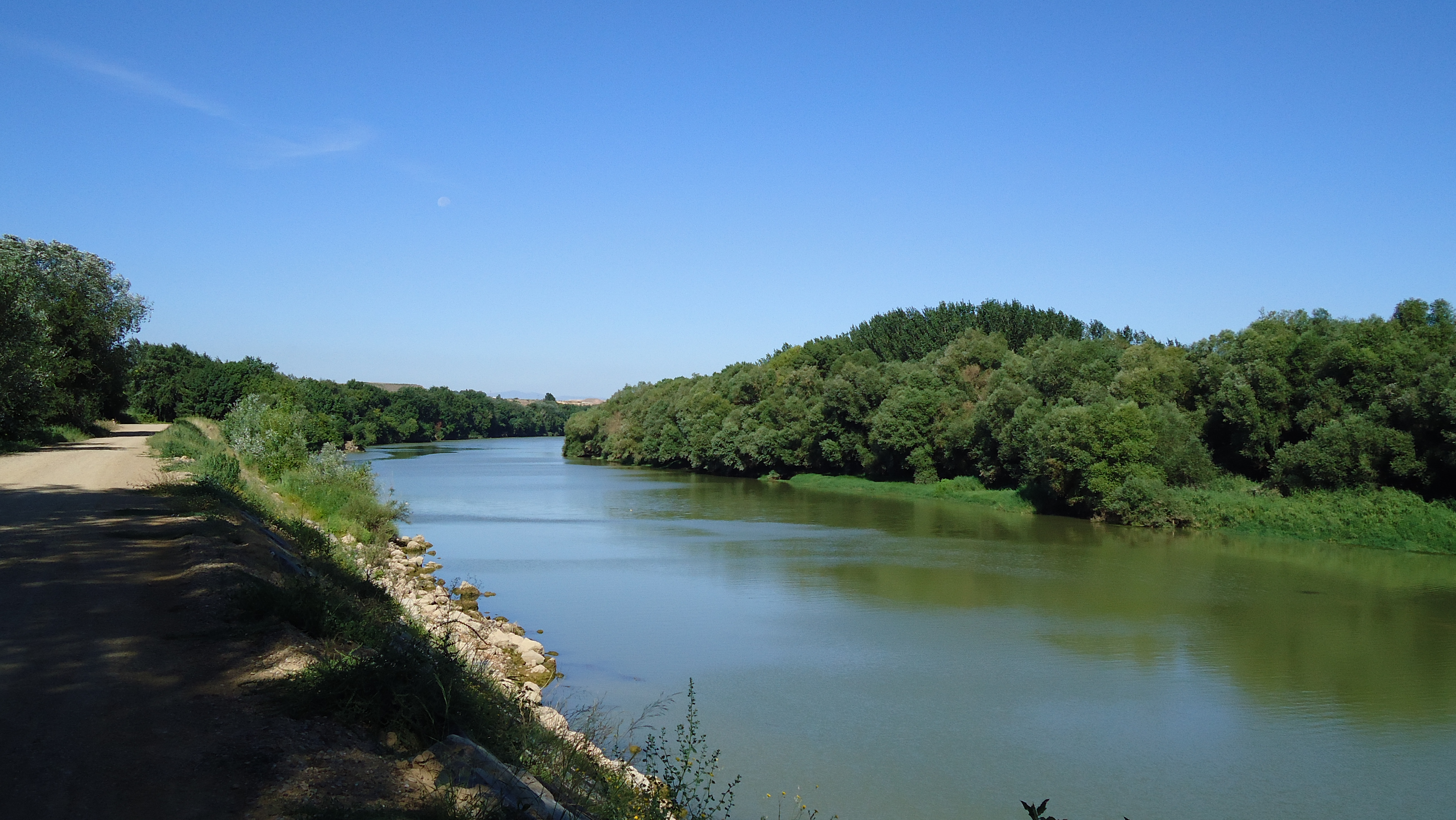
turning away: Ribera

The area which witnessed most visible change in terms of political preferences was the Southern belt (Ribera Alta, Ribera Arga, Ribera Aragón, Bardenas Reales, Ribera Baja). The municipalities along the Upper Ebro started to turn away from Carlism during the late 1890s. The southern municipios of Estella and Tafalla districts, Ribera Arga and Ribera Aragón, including cities of Olite and Tafalla, were usually lukewarm to Carlism, with the only exception the years around 1910, when Bartolomé Feliu Pérez briefly reversed the pattern. Municipalities along the Lower Ebro did not display clear preferences until the 1910s, though in Ribera Baja Carlism for decades maintained its insular fortress in the capital Tudela, losing the city after 1910 and failing to retake it. From then onwards, the entire Ribera Oriental was irreversibly slipping into the hands of Carlist enemies – mostly Republicans, though also the Socialists.

== Personalities ==
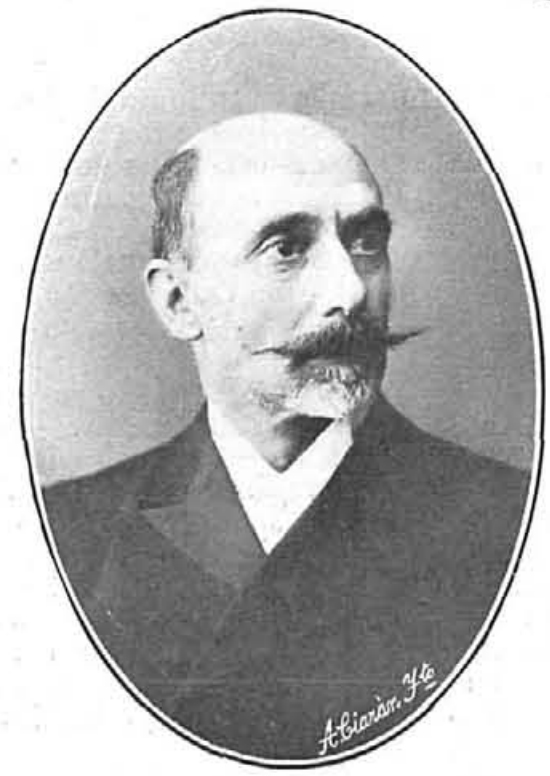
Joaquín Lloréns

There were 20 individuals elected as Carlist deputies from Navarre during the Restauración, plus an unspecified number of candidates who at least once ran for the Cortes, but have never been successful. The two who stand head and shoulders above are non-Navarros, Joaquín Lloréns Fernández and Juan Vázquez de Mella, who served 8 terms each as Navarrese deputies in the Cortes.

Joaquín Lloréns Fernández (1854-1930) was a Levantine and a soldier, commanding the Carlist artillery during the Third Carlist War. He commenced his parliamentary career elsewhere, but starting 1901 he was continuously 8 times elected from Estella; his position in the district was so dominant that no-one dared to confront him in the 1910-1916 period; however, he was defeated in Estella by an cerralbista candidate in 1919. Juan Vázquez de Mella (1861-1928) was an Asturian and a leading Carlist theorist. Though he served 8 Navarrese terms in the Cortes, he was elected only 7 times (3 times from Estella and 4 times from Pamplona), as in 1903 he replaced the successful candidate, Miguel Irigaray. Both were not typical cuñeros (cuckoo candidates), as over time they became deeply involved in local issues.

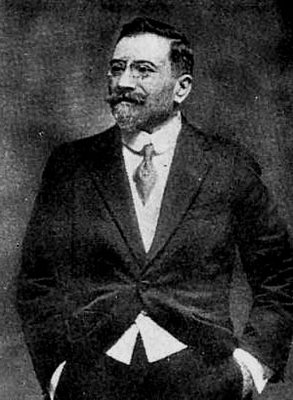
Juan Vázquez de Mella

The most notable local deputy was Romualdo Cesáreo Sanz Escartin, the Carlist general from Pamplona; he was the first Carlist MP elected in the province during Restauración, successful in his native city 5 times and later serving also in the Senate. The most elected Integrist candidate was José Sánchez Marco, representing Pamplona in 1907, 1910 and 1914; the other Integrists elected were Ramón Nocedal and Arturo Campión. The only deputy elected as independent Carlist was Justo Garrán Moso, who ran when both Jaimistas and Integristas did not field official candidates. Two cases when the national Carlist leaders competed in Navarre were these of Bartolomé Feliu Pérez in 1910 and Luis Hernando de Larramendi in 1920, though there were local Navarrese leaders standing, like Simón Montoya Ortigosa (unsuccessfully) in the 1890s, or Gabino Martínez Lope García (successfully) in the 1910s. Two condes de Rodezno provided the only example of two generations - father and son - serving as Carlist Navarrese deputies. Most Carlist candidates were related to Navarre, though apart from Llorens there were other exceptions, e.g. Lorenzo Sáenz.

The candidate who gathered the highest number of votes was de Mella in 1907 (13.341) and in 1914 (11.338); the threshold of 10.000 votes was exceeded also by Sanchez Marco in 1907 (10.166) and by Sanz in 1891 (10.003); due to size of the constituency, all were cases of the Pamplona district. In terms of the percentage of votes gained the primacy goes to Llorens Fernandez, who was supported by 99.51% of the voters in Estella in 1907. Altogether there were 8 cases of Carlists gaining a mandate according to the notorious Article 29, i.e. with no counter-candidate standing: Lloréns from Estella in 1910, 1914 and 1916, Tomás Domínguez Romera from Aoiz in 1914, Vázquez de Mella and Sanchez Marco in 1910, Víctor Pradera in 1918 and Joaquín Baleztena in 1920 (all from Pamplona).

== Success factors ==
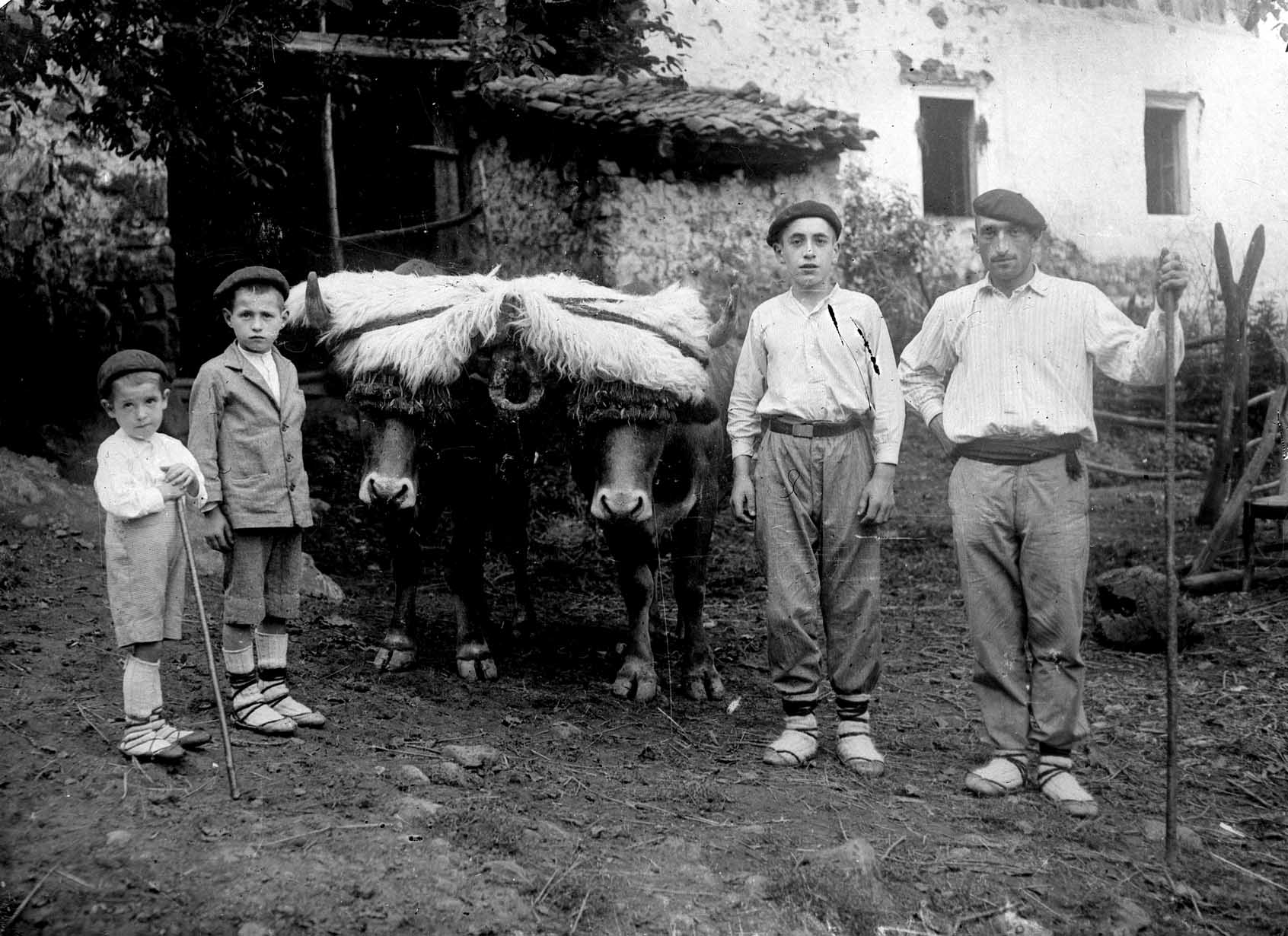
Vascongadas peasants

The most popular group of theories evaluating the Carlist popularity (or lack of thereof) points to socio-economic conditions, though scholars from this school might present contradictory conclusions. The prevailing theory claims that Carlism thrived in rural areas with large commons and dominated by middle-size holdings, at least self-sustainable but usually able to enter the market exchange. This type of units provided economic grounds for peasant owners, the social base of Carlism, and was frequent in the Northern belt of Spain, typical in most of Navarre. Whenever this social group was giving way to owners of small, non-sustainable plots, landless peasants, tenants, rural workers and jornaleros – like was the case in the Navarrese Ribera, home to many local landowners – Carlism was losing its base. At the opposite edge of the province, in the Pyrenees, low soil fertility and short vegetation periods reduced efficiency of medium-size holdings, leading to land shortage and the resulting tension, partially defused by emigration. In case rural areas were industrialized, the ensuing social mobility was undermining traditional life patterns and undercutting Carlist popularity, like is supposed to be the case of Corredor del Araquil.

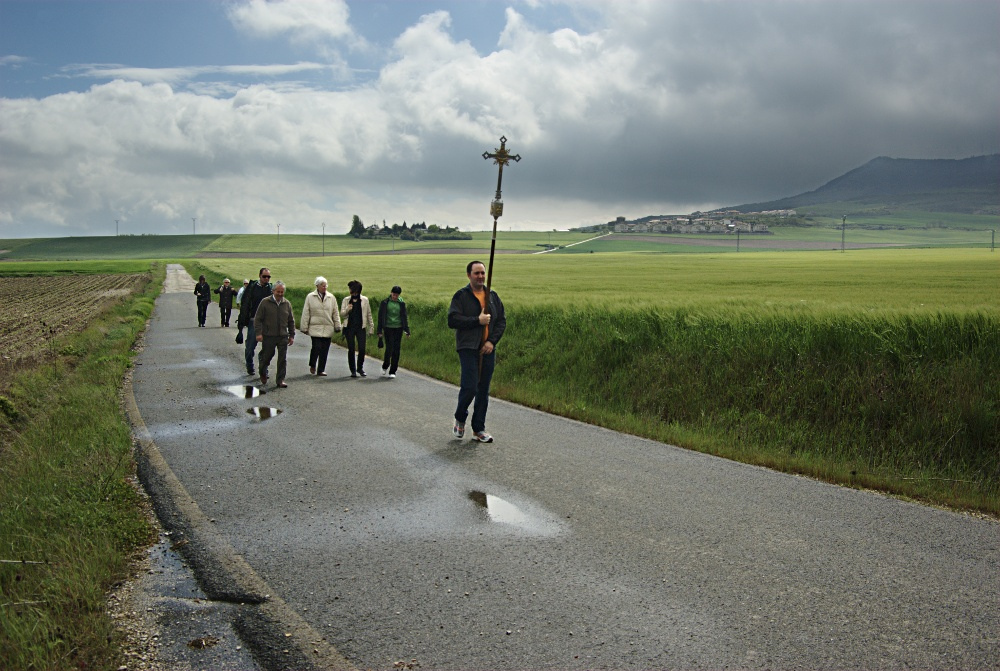
romería in Navarre

Another group of determinants listed is related to culture and religion. It is noted that Carlism was strongly related to religiosity, most fervent in the Northern provinces, and a dense parochial network, served mostly by clergymen originating from the same area, kept sustaining the movement. Population groups demonstrating religious indifference or outward hostility, like socially mobile middle-class professionals dominating culturally and politically in urban communities, are held responsible for trailing Carlist popularity in the cities and around, leading even to emergence of an anti-urban thread within Carlism. Liberal influence of emigrees or returnees in the North, combined with first-hand experience of secular French state across the Pyrenees, is quoted as a possible reason for loose Traditionalist grip on the mountainous municipalities.

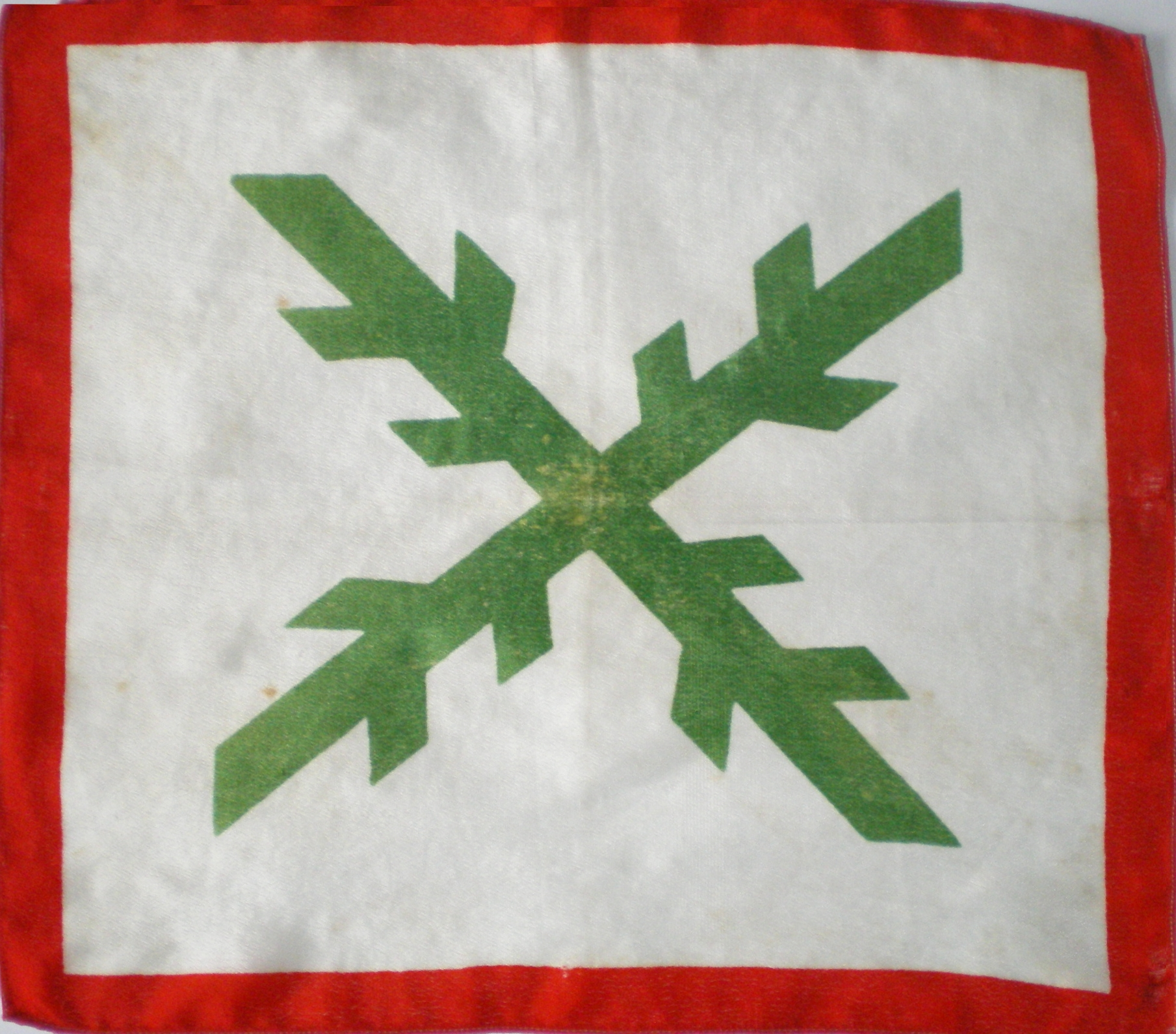
Euzko Mendigoizale Batza emblem

One of the most controversial issues is correlation between Carlism and Basque nationalism. There is little doubt that until some point in time Carlism and Basque ethnic identity sustained each other, which helps to understand limited support for Carlism in the South-Eastern part of Navarre. The discussion is mostly about when the two started to part, to what extent Basque nationalism owes some of its characteristics to Carlism, and to what extent the decline of Carlism resulted from its electorate having been taken over by Basque parties.

Carlist historiography of the last decades seems marked by increasing skepticism towards socio-economic conditions being put on the forefront, now suspected of schematic Darwinism and oversimplifications. One reviewer underlines emergence of works focusing on "microsystems of daily life", like collective mentality, religious and moral values, anthropological factors, customs, family interaction patterns etc. Another historiographer asks whether the new wave of works marks a return to politics as a primary analysis key. This approach is yet to contribute to understanding the patterns of Carlist electoral results in Navarre.

== See also ==
- Electoral Carlism (Restoration)
- Carlism
- Integrism (Spain)
- Restoration
- José Sánchez Marco
- Joaquin Llorens Fernandez de Cordoba
- Ramón Nocedal Romea
- Tomas Dominguez Arevalo
- Joaquin Baleztena Ascarate
- Juan Vázquez de Mella

== Appendix. Navarrese deputies 1879-1923 ==
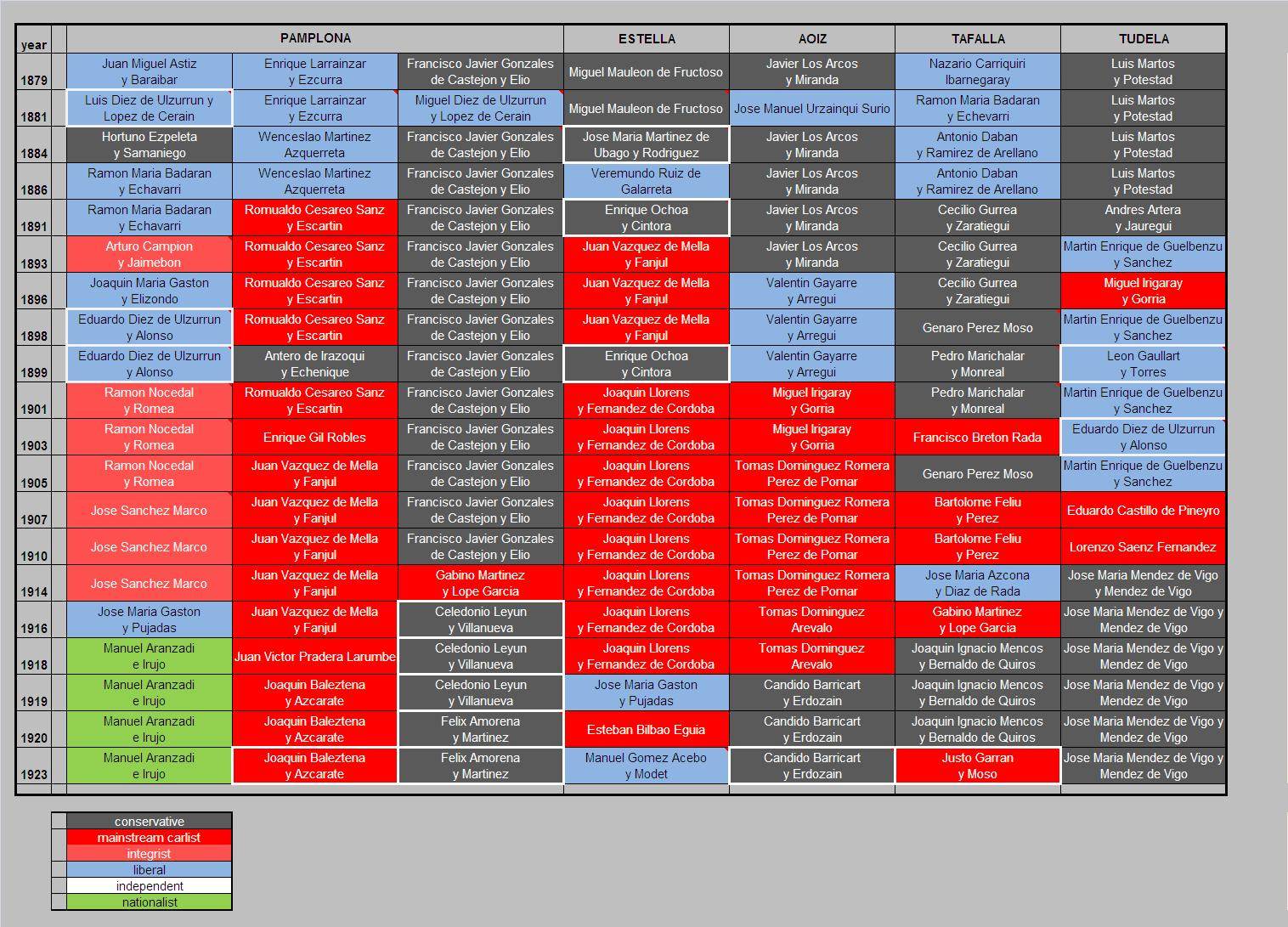
