= Ramón Nocedal =

Spanish Catholic ultraconservative politician

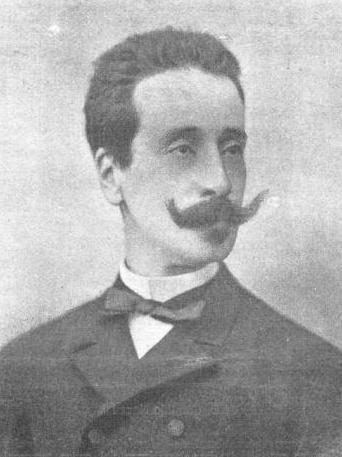
- Born: Ramón Nocedal Romea; 1842; Madrid, Spain
- Died: 1907 (aged 64–65); Madrid, Spain
- Occupations: lawyer, politician
- Known for: politician
- Political party: Comunión Católico-Monarquica, Partido Católico Nacional

Ramón Nocedal Romea (1842–1907) was a Spanish politician, first member of the Neocatólicos, then of the Carlists, and finally of the Integrists. He is known as the leader of a political current known as Integrismo (1888–1907) and a chief representative of Catholic fundamentalism when applied to politics.

== Family and youth ==
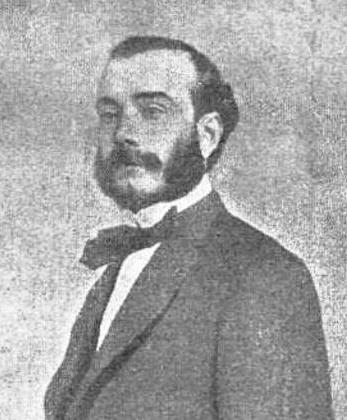
Cándido Nocedal

Ramón Ignacio Nocedal Romea was born to a distinguished and well-off Madrid family. His paternal grandfather, José María Nocedal Capetillo, was a member of the emerging liberal bourgeoisie. He was an exemplary representative of the class which benefitted from Mendizabal's desamortización, purchasing a number of estates in Ciudad Real province and in Madrid, where he became one of the largest urban proprietors of the mid-19th century. An important member of radical Partido Progresista, over time he turned to its major opponent, Partido Moderado. José María sustained financially Milicia Nacional of Madrid and was one of its commanders, in the late 1830s heading the 4th battalion. He was elected to the Senate in 1844 and 5 times voted into the Cortes between 1841 and 1857.

Ramón's father, Cándido Manuel Patricio Nocedal Rodriguez de la Flor (1821-1885), was one of the key politicians of Partido Moderado, its long-time parliamentary representative and briefly (1856-1857) the Minister of Interior. Over time he assumed more and more conservative positions, in the 1860s forming part of the neocatólicos. Ramón's mother, Manuela del Pilar Zoila Romea Yanguas (1824-1875), was the daughter of Mariano Romea, a radical liberal. During the Trienio Liberal he made his name as Capitán de las Milicias Patrióticas de Murcia; following the absolutist restoration he had to seek refuge in Portugal; back in Spain, he was administrator of Murcian landholdings of marqueses de Espinardo. Ramón's maternal uncle, Julián Romea Yanguas, was one of the best known Spanish actors and sort of celebrity of his time. Ramón's maternal aunt, Joaquina Romea Yanguas, was married to the moderado prime minister, holder of various ministerial posts and Isabel II's lover, Luis Gonzalez Bravo.

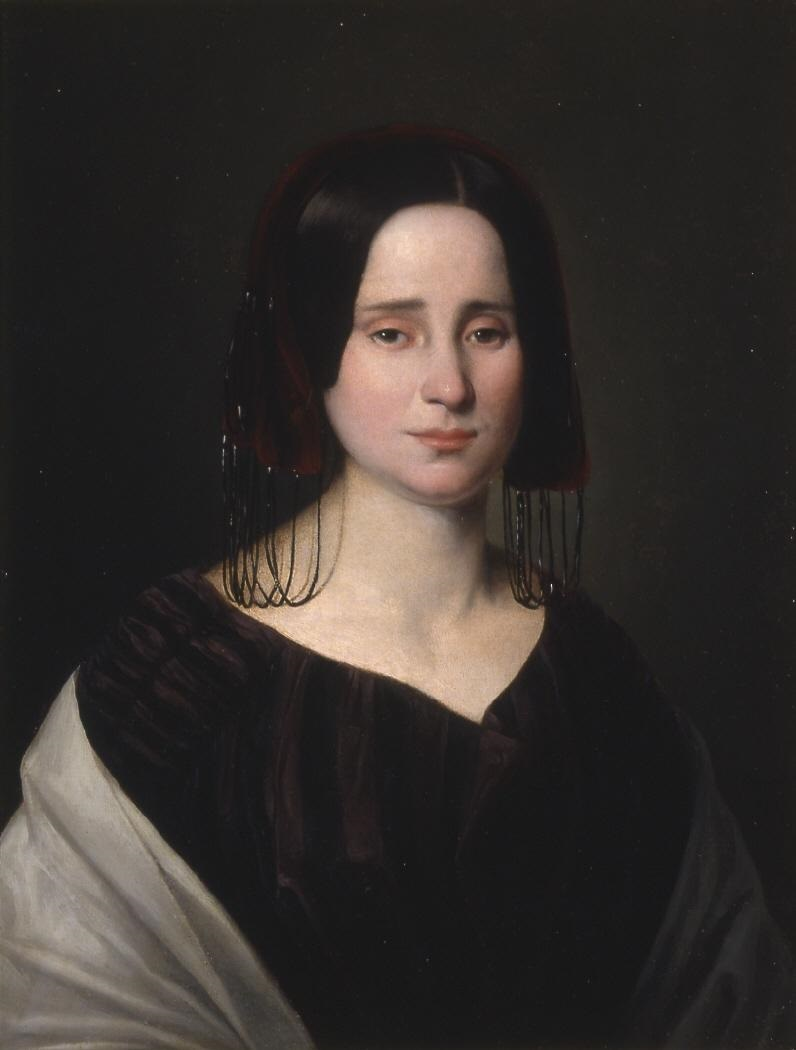
Manuela Romea

Ramón and his two younger siblings, María del Consuelo and José, were from their early childhood growing amongst political and artistic personalities of mid-19th century Spain. In the early 1860s Ramón studied derecho civil y canonico in Madrid and was recognized as excellent student, gaining prizes and hailed in the press. In 1873 he married Amalia Mayo Albert (1853-1922); her grandfather was one of the Royal Company of the Philippines managers; her father, born in Manila, was a lawyer and landholder. The couple had no issue, though their relationship is described as “enamoradísimo”; Amalia is reported as supporting Ramón in his political decisions and at times even pushing him towards intransigence. Nocedal's nephew, Ramón García Rodrigo Nocedal, was a well-known journalist and aspiring Maurista politician. Another nephew, Agustín González de Amezúa y Mayo, was an academic and historian of literature, one of key intellectuals of early Francoism.

== Neocatólico ==
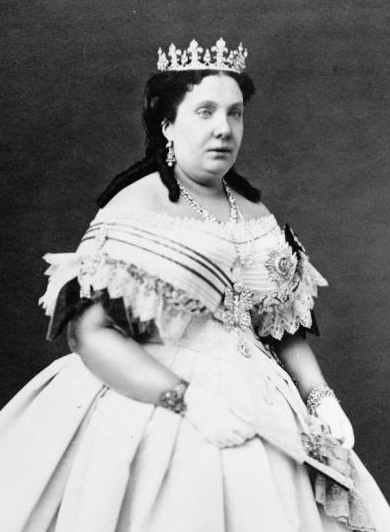
S. M. Isabell II

The Nocedals have always remained mutual closest collaborators, demonstrating also similar political style and perfectly fitting the like father like son scheme. When commencing his public activities in the early 1860s Ramón has followed his parent; at that time, Cándido Nocedal has already departed from the moderados camp and formed part of the neocatólicos. The movement, with its foundations laid in early Isabelline years, strived to politically accommodate orthodox Roman Catholicism within the framework of the liberal monarchy; in the 1860s Cándido acted as one of its leaders.

Having obtained excellent marks upon graduation, in 1864 Ramón engaged in setting up La Armonía, a Catholic cultural society. With all neocatólicos pundits taking part, it was created as a response to krausism; its principal aim remained confronting heterodoxy in education. Lambasting the leading krausist Sanz del Rio, La Armonía promoted Catholic orthodoxy as a backbone of public education. It was at its sitting that Ramón delivered his first public lecture, Rute. In 1867 he set up La Cruzada, “semanal de ciencias, literatura y artes”. This short-lived weekly served as a tribune for publishing his highly militant articles, often re-printed in other ultraconservative periodicals; underlining the role of Christianity, they turned against the idea of krausist “examen libre”. Also in 1867 he became secretary of Royal Academy of Jurisprudence and Legislation.

In late 1867 neocatólicos mounted a last-minute attempt to resuscitate the Isabelline monarchy by building a grand counter-revolutionary party and launching a new daily La Constancia as part of the project. Ramón became member of the editorial board and contributed with militant articles, which were already becoming his personal trademark and which immediately elicited return fire from the liberal press. Due to his intransigence always loved by lampooners, he was first mocked in 1867. Ramón blamed the Carlists for leaving Isabel II no option but to have allied with the liberals; this error, however, was still rectifiable by creating a strong, conservative alliance. Demonstrating some degree of dynastical indifference, he underlined that ideas come first and people later, and pointed that for the Carlists, this order was reversed. Political project of the neocatólicos crashed with the Glorious Revolution; La Constancia ceased to appear as its premises were ransacked.

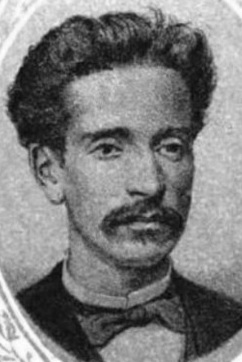
Nocedal in his 20s

In 1868 both Nocedals were among co-founders of Asociación de Católicos, Ramón acting as secretary of its comité organizador. The organization served as electoral alliance prior to the 1869 elections, and indeed Ramón was reported as running in Granada and Motril. In 1869 he joined Juventud Católica and became head of its education detachment, already recognized not only as a writer, but also as a great speaker. In 1869-1870 he made his name as author of theatrical plays, scholarly pieces and short novels, all formatted as part of the Catholic political campaign and at times causing violent clashes among the public of Madrid theatres.

== Carlist: Revolution and war ==
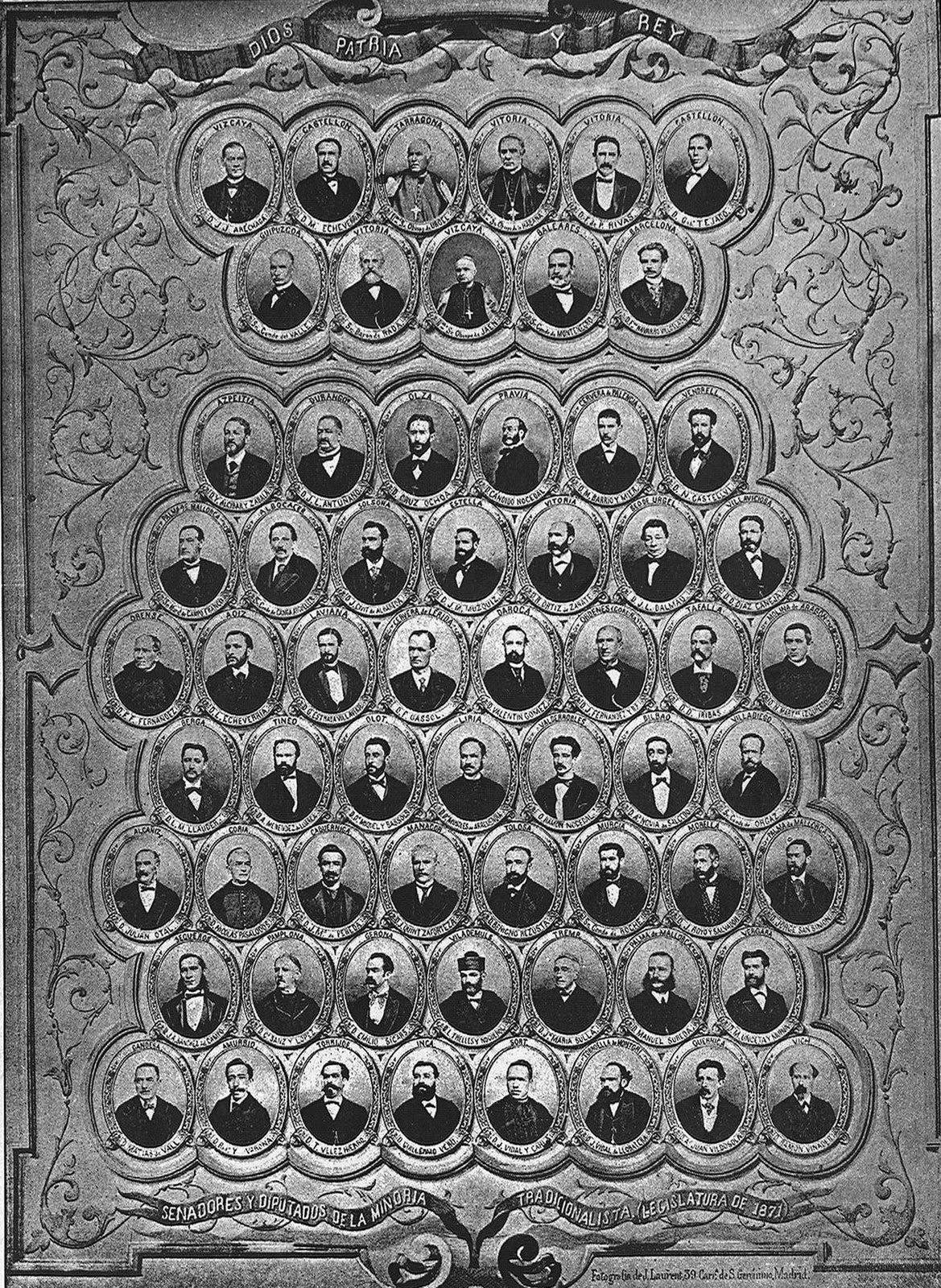
Carlist MPs, 1871

Since the 1868 Revolution the neocatólicos neared the Carlists; in 1870, following abdication of Isabel II, most of them concluded that revolutionary tide could no longer be confronted by liberal monarchy and that ultraconservative Carlist model provided a much better bulwark. As they were adinásticos monarchists, switching from one dynasty to another did not constitute a problem. In 1870 the neos and the Carlists formed a joint electoral alliance, Asociación Católico-Monarquica, with Ramón unsuccessfully running on its ticket in supplementary 1870 elections in Alcala de Henares. In 1871 he renewed his bid from the Catholic-monarchist list, though by the press he was already widely reported simply as a Carlist candidate. Defeated in Igualada (Barcelona province), Ramón emerged triumphant in Valderrobres (Teruel province). Once in the Cortes, his activity exploded. In May and June 1871 almost every day the Spanish press reported his harangues, most of them ultraconservative and some almost openly disloyal to Amadeo I.

In early 1872 Ramón edited a manifesto, issued later by Junta Central Católico-Monarquica, which might have been interpreted as a hardly veiled call for rebellion. On the other hand, historians consider the Nocedals the opponents of violent action, as both father and son believed that Traditionalist monarchy might be reinstated by legal means and advised the Carlist claimant Carlos VII accordingly. In the spring of 1872 Ramón ran on Catholic-monarchist ticket in another electoral campaign, but failed to prolong his mandate both in Igualada and in Valderrobres.

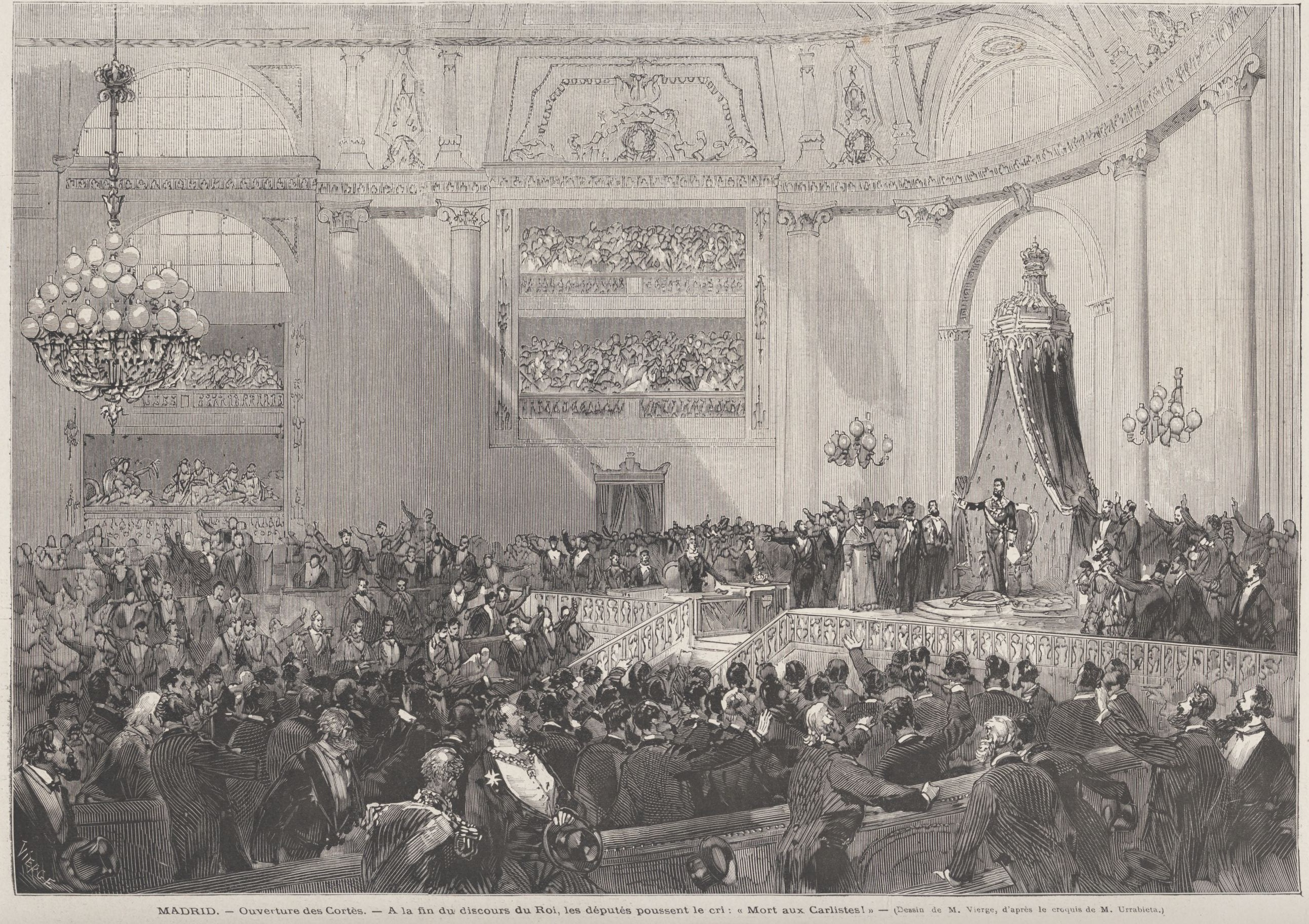
Cortes 1872: death to the Carlists!

Upon the outbreak of the Third Carlist War in 1872 both Nocedals remained in Madrid, where they were subject to rather minor legal action. Their political activity was reduced almost to nil; unable to and indeed uneasy about openly supporting the rebels, they allowed themselves only veiled demonstrations of enmity towards the newly established republican regime. Ramón withdrew to privacy: in 1873 he got married and in 1875 he buried his mother. He was also busy preparing his plays for stage performance in Madrid theatres, though his whereabouts remain somewhat confused. Early 1875, with the war outcome still unclear, the Nocedals launched a new daily, El Siglo Futuro. Formatted as militantly Catholic, it evaded any political declarations though clearly identified itself as ultraconservative. Later that year the official mistrust towards the Nocedals climaxed in the order of exile; they spent the time travelling across Portugal and France until the ban was lifted in late 1876.

== Carlist: Restoration ==
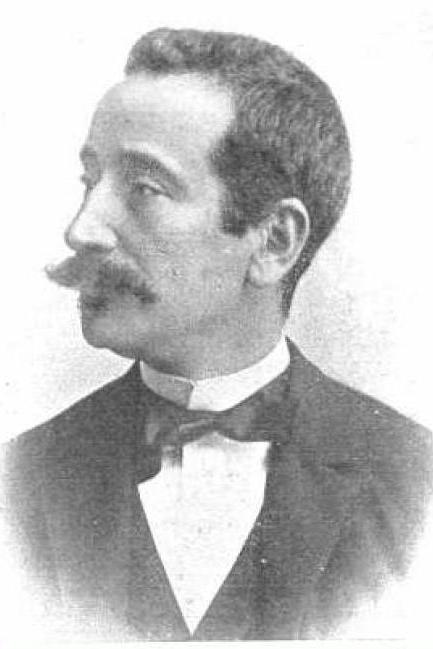
Nocedal in his 30s

Following the 1876 military defeat Carlism found itself in disarray. The claimant commenced his bon vivant period leaving political leadership in hands of an inefficient military junta; his followers suffered detentions, expropriations and exile. The Nocedals, who emerged as unofficial top Carlist representatives in the Republic-controlled area during the war already, opened their bid to revitalize the movement. Within limitations imposed by the circumstances, they mobilized support by means of a massive 1876 pilgrimage to Rome. Having attracted some 3,000 participants, it was officially intended as demonstration of loyalty to the papal Syllabus banner.

In the late 1870s two competitive visions emerged within Carlism. The Nocedals promoted the concept of a movement, formatted along ultra-Catholic lines and with guidance provided by massive press machinery; its strategy was defined as immovilismo or retraimiento, and consisted of total abstention in official political life. Their opponents, headed by marqués de Cerralbo, opted for a structured political party, with components of traditional Carlist ideario balanced; their strategy, known as aperturismo, envisioned conditional alignment with political rules of the Restauración. Ramón Nocedal, already admitted to meetings of top Carlist leaders with their king, got his way when in 1879 Carlos VII ended the period of indecision. First he appointed a small collegial Junta with Cándido Nocedal its member, and shortly afterwards nominated Ramón's father his political representative, Jefe Delegado.

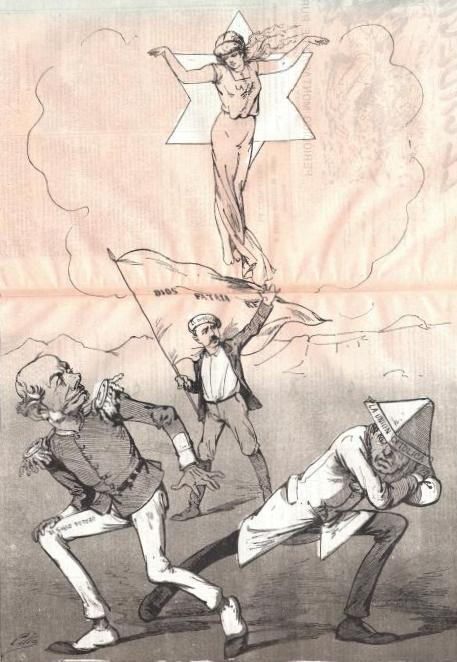
guerra periodistica

With Cándido Nocedal political leader and Ramón his closest collaborator, Carlism firmly adjusted all its activities to religious goals. In 1881 they planned another pilgrimage to Rome; Ramón became secretario general of junta organizadora, though the initiative eventually came to naught. When managing and writing to El Siglo Futuro he focused on Catholic and Spanish values, with regionalist and monarchist themes – let alone dynastical ones – reduced to secondary role. Though relentless towards those seeking rapprochement with the regime, the Nocedals were also implacable towards Carlists showing signs of dissent. The conflict between nocedalistas and cerralbistas resurfaced and triggered bitter guerra periodistica, with complaints about "la dictadura nocedalista" opening a new area of conflict. Many Carlist bigwigs grumbled against heavy Nocedals' hand and some conspired against them; the claimant, though irritated, refrained from bold action until Cándido Nocedal died in 1885.

There were rumors that it would be Ramón succeeding his father, but as a temporary measure Carlos VII granted partial and conditional interim rights to Francisco Navarro Villoslada. The aperturistas immediately mounted an offensive, trying to use any formal Carlist initiative as a launchpad for electoral action; Ramón Nocedal counter-attacked, with the claimant opting for a compromise: official party abstention in elections, but with individual candidates permitted here and there. As the 1887 rumors nominating general Cavero the next Jefe Delegado proved unfounded, with continuous guerra periodistica, Nocedal boycotting de Cerralbo's initiatives and both parties complaining about chaos, Carlism was increasingly stalled in internal strife, decomposition and paralysis.

== 1888 breakup ==
The conflict, for years localized and contained, entered its second phase in early 1888. Skirmishes between newspapers suddenly exploded when prestige of the claimant got involved; as Nocedal refused to budge, in August Carlos VII expulsed him from Carlism. Now both leaders rushed to acknowledge differences, with unusually brutal frankness listed by the claimant and Ramón Nocedal.

In historiography the breakup has been extensively discussed, though scholars highlight different points of contention, adversely interpreted dynamics of the conflict and contrasting methodologies. The most traditional judgement underlines the clash of personalities. Ramón Nocedal, son of political leader and himself raised to be a leader, considered it natural that he should have succeeded his father. His decisive leadership style and age seniority versus Carlos VII – a charismatic figure anxious not to be reduced to a decorative role by one of his subjects – did not help. In Carlism-biased versions of this theory, Nocedal is characterized by overgrown personal ambitions, in propaganda mocked as “Ramón I Pontífice Rey del Universo” or “Ramón Romea y Nocedal”.

Another group of scholars tend to focus on ideological differences. Among this group the prevailing theory places the role of religion in core of the growing conflict within Carlism, pointing that while Nocedal clearly aimed at reducing monarchical, dynastical and fuerista threads to secondary roles, Carlos VII intended to keep balance between all components of the Traditionalist ideario. Both parties present their variants here: according to the Carlists, Nocedal intended to disfigure the party into “acción eminente apostólica”, according to the Integrists, it was the claimant who deviated from principles of Traditionalism.

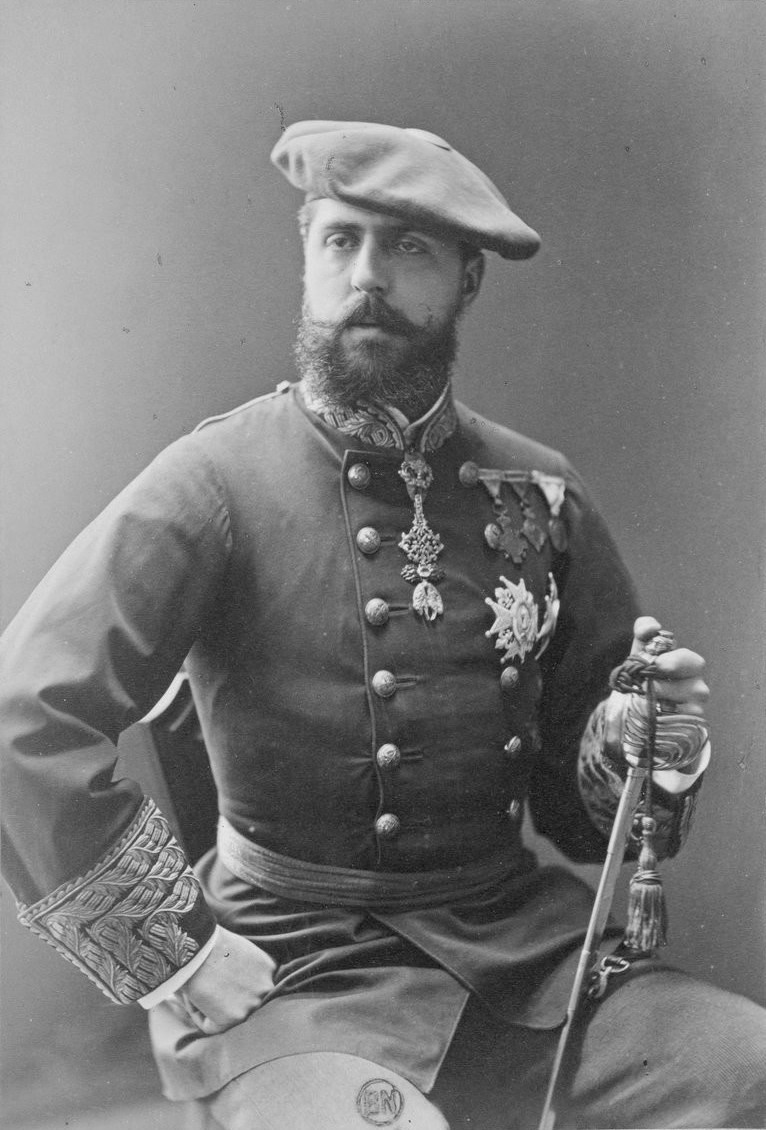
Carlos VII

Within the school concerned with ideological differences, another theory seeks clarification in externalization of the Spanish case; instead of pointing to unique Spanish character of Carlism, it highlights general European patterns of change. With ultramontanism gaining upper hand over more conciliatory political incarnations of Catholicism after the First Vatican Council, and with the new approach made popular in the neighboring France by Louis Veuillot, the 1888 schism was nothing but a local Spanish manifestation of the trend. Defining the nascent Integrism as religious particularism striving for hegemony, this theory enjoys rather limited popularity.

Another ideology-focused approach defines both parties not as competing trends within Carlism, but as entirely separate political groupings which between 1870 and 1888 remained in a temporary, shaky alliance. According to this analysis, the religion-focused group has always been clearly distinct from Carlism. In partisan version, launched in the 1970s for the sake of political struggle, Traditionalists infiltrated into Carlism. Later this theory was elaborated further on and currently features 3 groupings: Integrists focusing on religious aims, Traditionalists focusing on dynastical aims and (genuine) Carlists focusing on social aims. Recently when discussing the 1888 rupture historians tend to combine all factors mentioned, without giving priority to any of them.

== Integrism ==
=== Early years ===
According to the liberals, the schism left Carlism on its last legs and close to total ruin. Nocedalistas claimed that their supporters were to be counted by the thousands. What actually constituted their potential was rather a few names and especially an impressive array of periodicals, as the breakaways were overrepresented across the Carlist editorial boards. Nocedal led the exiled dissidents into a new organization; initially to be named Partido Tradicionalista, in early 1889 it materialized as Partido Integrista Español. The name was supposed to underline integral unity between Christian and political goals. Though in August 1889 the party renamed itself to Partido Católico Nacional, the group was usually referred to as Integristas. Structure of the party stabilised in 1893; each Spanish region was led by a junta, with their work co-ordinated by the party jefe. The post was assumed by Nocedal, which clearly demonstrated his personal grip on Integrism.

The program, summarized in Manifestación de Burgos, focused on building an orthodox Christian state as the ultimate objective and confronting sinister liberalism as the target for today. In terms of political regime the Integrists voiced against party politics and parliamentarism, instead advancing later the theory of organic democracy, i.e. a system based on formal interaction of established, complementary and co-operative social bodies. The party dropped “king” from the Carlist ideario. Though Nocedal remained a staunch monarchist and though a theoretical sovereign remained an important point of reference in terms of political mobilization, in fact the party was gradually embracing monarchy without a king, later eventually leaning towards accidentalism. Since the Integrists preached the notion of “Social Reign of Jesus Christ”, according to sarcastic comments they eschewed consideration of such details as a form of government.

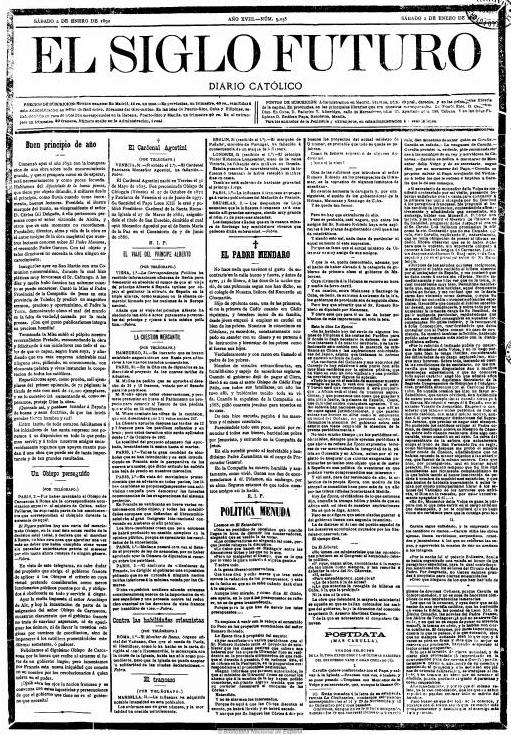
El Siglo Futuro, 1892

During last decade of the 19th century dynamics of the nocedalistas was powered mostly by mutual and extremely bitter hostility towards Carlists, who by far outpaced liberals as primary foes; occasionally the enmity has even erupted into violence. In the 1880s adamant not to take part in Restauración political system, in the 1890s Nocedal intended to turn elections into a battlefield where he could humiliate Carlos VII. The rivalry was made particularly pungent by geographically overlapping Integrist and Carlist zones of influence: though their national electoral strength remained an untested quality, it was clear that both groups enjoyed most support in Vascongadas and Navarre.

During the 1891 campaign the Integrists won 2 Cortes mandates compared to 5 gained by the Carlists; though they had to acknowledge numerical inferiority, Nocedal boasted personal success in the Gipuzkoan district of Azpeitia. His victory was indeed made triumphant, as he thrashed the provincial Carlist jefe Tirso de Olazábal and as Carlos VII seemed more interested in defeating Nocedal personally than in result of electoral competition in all other districts. Great speaker, in 1893 the Integrist leader repeated his Azpeitia triumph over the same opponent; on the national basis the party gained 2 mandates against 7 obtained by the Carlists. In 1896 the Integrists failed to gain a single ticket; also Nocedal was defeated in Azpeitia.

=== Final years ===
Integrist mandates, 1891-1905
| year | mandates |
| 1891 | Azpeitia (Nocedal), Zumaya (Zuzuarregui) |
| 1893 | Azpeitia (Nocedal), Pamplona (Campion) |
| 1896 | - |
| 1898 | - |
| 1899 | Azpeitia (Olazábal) |
| 1901 | Azpeitia (Aldama), Salamanca (Sánchez Campo), Pamplona (Nocedal) |
| 1903 | Pamplona (Nocedal), Salamanca (Sánchez Campo) |
| 1905 | Azpeitia (Sánchez Marco), Pamplona (Nocedal) |

In the mid-1890s, Nocedal realized that his bid to launch a nationwide Catholic ultraconservative party had failed; clinging to his intransigence, he nevertheless refused to reconsider the Integrist project and thought it his moral duty to represent orthodox Christian values and confront liberalism against all odds. Other members of the party were not so principled and until his death Nocedal had to deal with successive defections, though there was no-one who posed a serious threat to his personal lead.

As early as 1893 the Integrist pundits, Juan Ortí y Lara and marqués de Acillona, advocated reformatting the party as a looser Catholic alliance; once their proposal was rejected, they left. Soon afterwards Nocedal expulsed the group supporting Arturo Campión, another strong personality temporarily associated with Integrism; the breakup produced loss of the Navarrese daily El Tradicionalista and some Navarrese leaders. In the late 1890s Integrism suffered in its stronghold, Gipuzkoa. As they refused to step into line, the dissenters were ousted by the local Junta, taking with them the provincial El Fuerista daily. In 1899 Nocedal expulsed a Jesuit priest in the “Pey y Ordeix” affair, as he was accused of preaching heterodoxy.

In 1898 Nocedal was elected a senator from Gipuzkoa, but for unclear reasons he did not enter the upper chamber. The turn of the centuries produced gradual rapprochement between Integrists and Carlists at the local level; regional juntas agreed electoral deals first in Gipuzkoa and later in Navarre. As supporters of Carlos VII made sure Nocedal was excluded, in Azpeitia the Integrists successfully fielded a local candidate, Juan Olazábal Ramery. In 1901 Nocedal ran in Pamplona and lost, but he entered Cortes due to procedural appeals. 1903 marked more than a truce between former brethren, as Nocedal was elected from the Integrist-Carlist-Conservative list in the Navarrese capital, re-elected on the same ticket in the last campaign of his life in 1905.

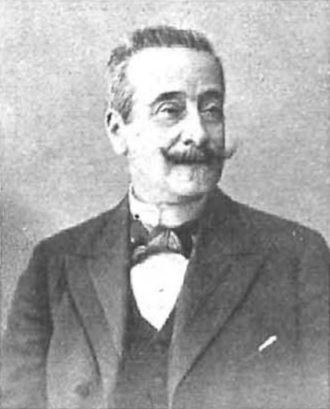
Nocedal in his 60s

Though Nocedal calibrated all his political activity according to religious principles and though he intended to be the Church's most loyal son, he enjoyed significant support only amongst lower parochial vasco-navarrese clergy and in Society of Jesus. His relations with the hierarchy were a series of misgivings. The episcopate, keen to stay on good terms with all governments, were alienated by intransigent Integrist strategy and clear anti-establishment profile of the party. Denied the exclusive Catholic license, Nocedal more often than not clashed with the bishops on politics-related issues. When in early 20th century Vatican changed its strategy, the new semi-democratic format of policy-making suited Íntegros even less. Nocedal vehemently opposed the related malmenorismo; the ensuing public debate triggered the 1906 encyclical, Inter Catolicos Hispaniae, while nuncio Rinaldini blamed Nocedal for failure of a grand Catholic coalition. Though at this point even the Jesuits turned away from Integrism, as probably the last political initiative of his life Nocedal joined forces with the Carlist pundit Juan Vázquez de Mella and set up Alianza Católico-Antiliberal, a diehard electoral platform he did not endure to test.

== Reception and legacy ==
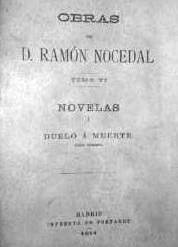
Obras, vol. 6, 1911

Some contemporaries concluded that Integrism died together with Nocedal, the opinion which reflected his immense personal influence on the party but which underestimated the mobilizing potential of ultraconservative, militant Spanish Catholicism. The party leadership was assumed by a triumvirate and shortly afterwards by Juan Olazábal Ramery, who remained faithful to Nocedal's line. Until the early 1930s the party – at that time named Comunión Tradicionalista-Integrista – maintained its branches in almost all Spanish provinces and kept winning some seats in local elections, apart from the Vasco-Navarrese area gaining also few mandates in Catalonia and Andalusia. In 1932 the Integrists re-united with Carlism and shared its later fate. El Siglo Futuro remained in print for 61 years until its premises were ransacked by Republican militia in July 1936.

Pedro Carlos González Cuevas classifies Nocedal as a predecessor of the Spanish far-right. Integrism itself is viewed by some scholars as a temporary offshoot branch of Carlism, and by some as a grouping with clearly separate ideological identity.

Following Nocedal's death a multi-volume collection of his works, chiefly a vast selection of his press articles, but also novels and theatrical plays, was published in Madrid between 1907 and 1928; part of it was reprinted in 2012 by an American public-domain publisher, Nabu Press. In 1952 an anthology of his works was published by Editorial Tradicionalista, which defined him as a Traditionalist Carlist. There are few streets in Spain named after Ramón Nocedal, e.g. the one in Elda. Perhaps the most lasting of all his initiatives is Colegio El Carmen, an educational institution he decided to set up with his wife in Manises and functional as a Catholic college until today.

== See also ==
- Integrism (Spain)
- Cándido Nocedal
- Neocatólicos
- La Constancia
- Carlism
- Ultramontanism
- Partido Católico Nacional
- Electoral Carlism (Restoration)
- Navarrese electoral Carlism (Restoration)
- El Siglo Futuro
- Félix Sardà y Salvany
- Juan Olazábal Ramery
- Manuel Senante Martinez
