= José Sánchez Marco =

Spanish politician (1865-1949)

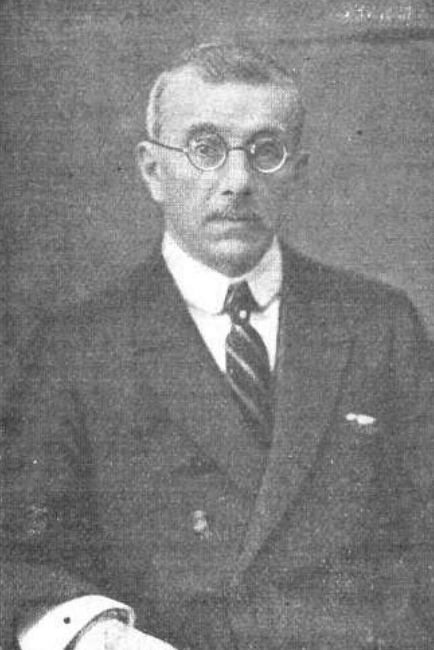
- Sánchez Marco in the 1920s
- Born: José Sánchez Marco; 1865; Tudela, Spain
- Died: 1949 (aged 83–84); Pamplona, Spain
- Occupations: lawyer, landowner
- Political party: PCN, CT

José Benigno Sánchez Marco (1865-1949) was a Spanish Traditionalist politician, associated mostly with a branch known as Integrism and operating as Partido Católico Nacional, though active also within the mainstream Carlism. He is recognized as one of the longest-serving Integrist deputies to the Cortes, his 4 consecutive terms lasting between 1905 and 1916. He also presided over a number of Navarrese Catholic and landowners’ organizations.

== Family and youth ==
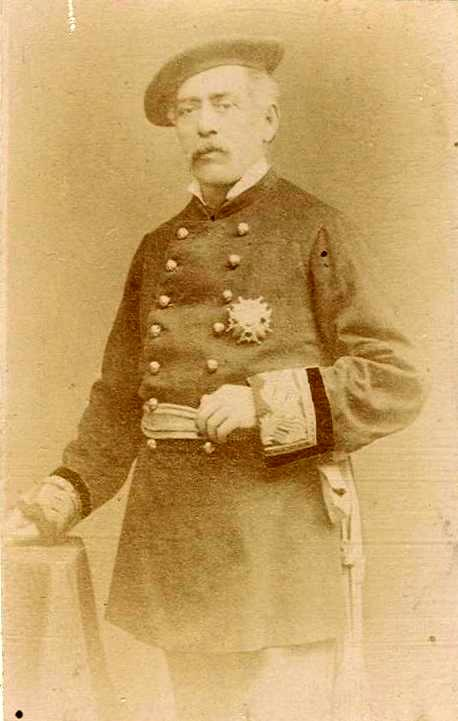
Marco de Bello

The Sánchez family originated from the Southern-Eastern part of Navarre, known as Ribera Baja. José's grandfather, Estanislao Sánchez, owned landholdings near Milagro and Cadreita. He married a girl from Aragón and possibly lived for some time in Catalonia, as their son and José's father, Francisco Sánchez Asso (1831-1904), was born in Sant Feliú de Guixols in the province of Gerona. Francisco settled in Tudela, where he practiced as lawyer and served as mayor. At unspecified time he married María Antonia Marco Rodrigo, a native of Bello (Teruel province) and member of a well known Aragonese family. Her father, Mariano Marco Catalan, served as captain of the hussars in the War of Independence; her paternal uncle, Juan Francisco Marco Catalan, earned his name as cardinal, growing to Governor of Rome and vice-camerlengo of the Holy Roman Church. Her older brother, Manuel Marco Rodrigo, was a military who earned his name during the Third Carlist War. Growing to commander of the Carlist Aragón troops and widely known as Marco de Bello, he became sort of an iconic figure in the movement.

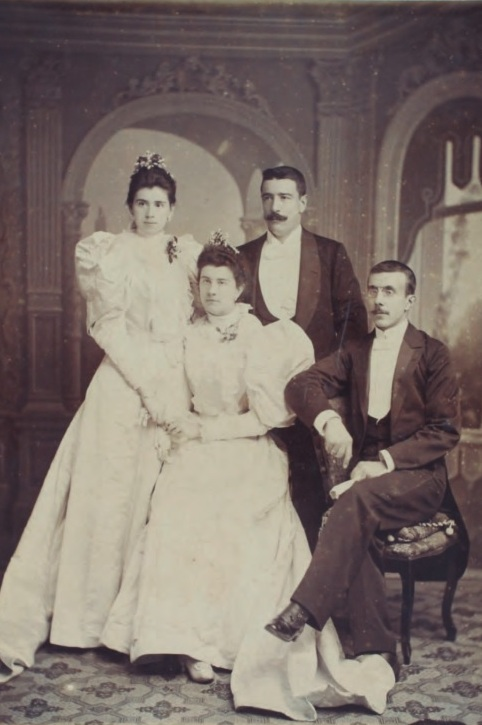
Sánchez Marco, his wife and other family members. around 1890

Francisco and María Antonia lived in Tudela; the couple had at least two children, though exact number is not clear. The young José left his family home in 1874, entering the Jesuit Colegio del Salvador in Zaragoza, where he graduated in 1880. At unspecified time he enrolled at Facultad de Derecho of the Zaragoza University, pursuing civil and canonical law; he graduated in both in 1887. The same year he entered the local Colegio de Abogados in Tudela, but did not commence his own practice at the time. Instead, he moved to Pamplona; until 1893 he served as abogado fiscal in the local Audiencia Provincial, the same year entering also Colegio de Abogados of the Navarrese capital. He inherited an estate of some 250 ha, located in the Ebro bend near Milagro, and is referred to also as "propietario".

At unspecified time José Sánchez Marco married Soledad Doussinague Casares (1870-1943), descendant to a petty bourgeoisie family; her father, Pedro Doussinague Adema, was related to a textile manufacturing business in the Gipuzkoan town of Laskurain. The couple had five children, who changed their name to Sánchez-Marco Doussinague; two sons and three daughters. Known locally in Navarrese realm, none of them became a nationally recognized figure; Antonio volunteered to the Carlist requeté during the Civil War; though not a military, he commanded a platoon in Tercio María de las Nieves battalion. Later on he served as concejal in the Pamplona ayuntamiento. María became a nun. José's grandson Carlos Sánchez-Marco Mendizabal is a historian and the moving spirit behind Fundación Lebrel Blanco, dedicated to culture and history of the province; another one, Javier Sánchez-Marco Mendizabal, made his name as an entrepreneur.

== Early political career (before 1905) ==
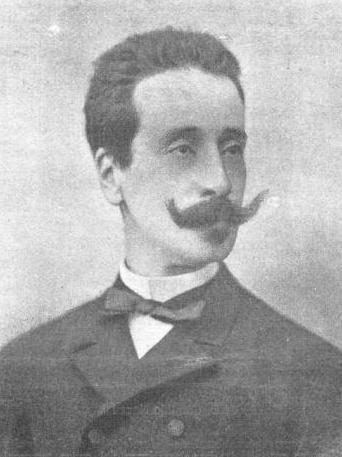
Ramón Nocedal

José inherited Traditionalist outlook from the ancestors. His father was active in the legitimist ranks in the 1860s, by no means a typical path, given Tafalla and Tudela were "distritos de mayor tradición liberal". In 1865 he entered Cortes as a Carlist-Catholic candidate elected from Pamplona and in the 1880s he remained a Traditionalist militant. José's maternal uncle – at that time not yet known as Marco de Bello - served as his godfather, specifically asked to provide spiritual guidance. José was entering the Carlist realm in the 1880s; at that time the movement was divided between an intransigent ultra-Catholic faction and a group prepared to recognize political setting of the Restoration. During final breakup of 1888 he followed his father and sided with the former, led by Ramón Nocedal; the group became known as the Integrists. In the early 1890s Sánchez Marco started to appear in the party press, initially merely as signatory of various venerating addresses and then as author of brief notes, hailing Nocedal. At that time his father was member of the Navarrese Integrist executive, Asamblea Regional.

In 1895 Sánchez Marco is first noted as taking part in a major party gathering in Azpeitia; speaking himself, he praised Gipuzkoa as a Spanish oasis, a province which preserved all traditional virtues of the country and was set to be its salvation ark. In 1896 the Integrist Madrid mouthpiece, El Siglo Futuro, published his major elaborate, formatted as a sophisticated discourse of divine role in civilization; he lambasted "absurdities of Rousseau, Kant, Hobbes and Schelling" and in what seemed like a typical lecture of Integrist outlook admitted inspiration by scholastic doctrine of the 16th century.

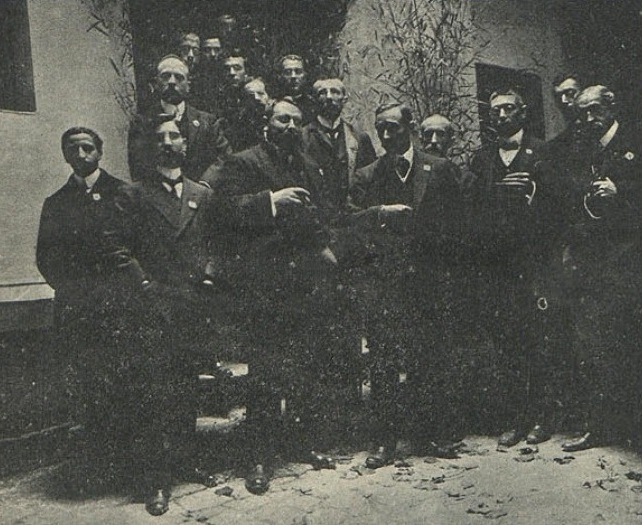
Sanchez Marco and other party leaders opening an Integrist circle in Barcelona, 1900s

In 1896 Sánchez Marco stood as an Integrist candidate for the Cortes from Pamplona. The party entered no alliance in the Carlist-Conservative dominated constituency; it is not clear whether initial reports of his success were genuine or rather formed part of the party propaganda; when eventually declared defeated, he protested electoral fraud. Active in the party ranks, in the late 1890s he grew to vice-president of Junta Regional, the Navarrese Integrist executive. There is no information on his taking part in electoral campaigns of 1898 and 1899. In the early 20th century the Integrists and the Carlists, venomously hostile during the preceding decades, neared each other. As a result, in 1901 they formed a joint Navarrese list and Sánchez Marco was its candidate in Tudela. Unsuccessful again he complained about official detentions of party electoral agents and other pucherazos.

Active in Church-sponsored initiatives he embarked on setting up joint workers and owners labor organizations, defusing conflict by arbitrary boards and insurance funds; at that time he counted as a "respected party member" dealing with representatives of the workers. He did not run in the 1903 general elections and targeted the Pamplona council instead; the same year he was elected to the ayuntamiento. As concejal he lambasted militant proletarian initiatives promoting Catholic groupings; as a lawyer he defended priests facing legal problems.

== Deputy (1905-1916) ==
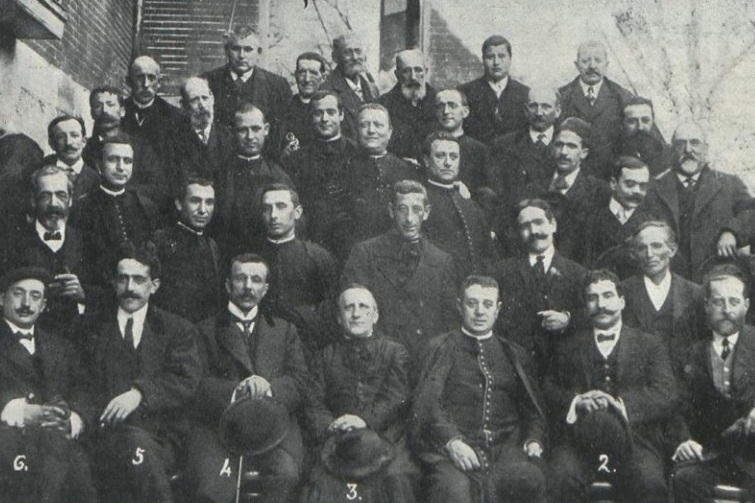
Sánchez Marco at Integrist gathering in Tarazona, 1910

Prior to the 1905 electoral campaign the Integrists joined Liga Foral Autonomista, a centre-right alliance active in the Vascongadas and Navarre. As representative of the party Sánchez Marco was offered a place on the alliance list in Azpeitia, a rural Gipuzkoan constituency which since the early 1890s remained an Integrist stronghold. Virtually assured of success he indeed emerged victorious and commenced a parliamentarian career which was to last during the following 11 years; the period of 1905-1916 marked his political climax.

Sánchez Marco's success relied on alliance with the Carlists, who in the early 20th century achieved political domination in Navarre. Enjoying position which was to last until the late 1910s, they used to gain most parliamentary mandates available for the province and by means of alliances partially controlled the remaining ones. As venomous hostility between the Integrists and the Carlists gave way to rapprochement, the former were key beneficiaries of the Carlist alliance strategy, especially by means of the so-called "second vote" in Pamplona. When the party leader Ramón Nocedal died in 1907, his place in the city was offered to Sánchez Marco, the second most important Integrist in Navarre. This mechanism ensured his success in 3 consecutive electoral campaigns of 1907, 1910 and 1914. In case of 1910 the Carlist-Integrist alliance enjoyed such a supremacy that no counter-candidate dared to challenge Sánchez Marco, who was declared victorious according to the notorious Article 29. Contemporary scholars count him among "grupo de poder de la ciudad" and member of the inter-related family cacique network.

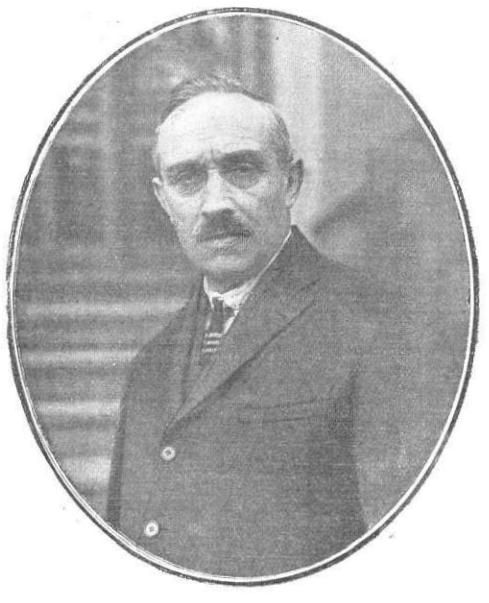
Juan Olazábal Ramery

Though in the chamber Sánchez Marco remained member of a minuscule, 2-person Integrist opposition minority, he turned a rather restless deputy; he excelled in harassing governments during question sessions, engaging in debates and launching new motions, usually swiftly killed during the legislative process. His activity was mostly about siding with the Church, promoting religious interests and attempting to thwart liberal designs; its climax fell on the 1910 debates related to the so-called Ley del Candado, when he animated local Junta Católica de Defensa. He became known also promoting regional establishments and especially official usage of Basque and Catalan, admitting allegiance to "nuestra lengua vascongada" and protesting exclusivity of castellano in the public realm. Last but not least, a number of times he intervened in local Navarrese cases.

Within Integrism Sánchez Marco was active taking part in propaganda gatherings in Navarre and sometimes beyond, mostly in Catalonia, though he withdrew from provincial Navarrese party structures and focused on nationwide executive. Already before Nocedal's death he used to take vice-president seats during various party assemblies; afterwards he entered a 7-member directorio and was one of its 2 vice-presidents. When in 1909 the body was re-formatted as a 3-member Jefatura, Sánchez Marco emerged as the second most important party figure after its president, Juan Olazábal Ramery.

== Ex-deputy and quasi-deputy (1917-1931) ==
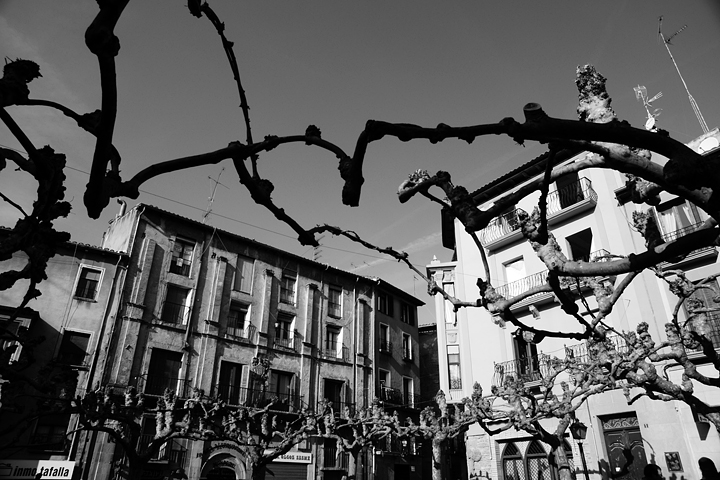
Tafalla

Sánchez Marco was always keen to maintain good relations with the Carlists. Though some grumbled about their patronizing stance, he was aware that the mandate very much depended on their support. He was also the first one who fell victim of their changed strategy, as during late Restauración the party adopted a pivotal stance concluding electoral deals with many parties at the expense of the Integros. In 1916 Sánchez Marco was not offered a place on the alliance list and ran stand-alone in Pamplona against a Jaimista-Romanonista-Maurista block, suffering defeat. In 1918 he intended to stand from Pamplona, but following unsuccessful haggling with the Maurists over a seat in the Senate he eventually withdrew. In 1919 he decided not to compete, while in 1920 he agreed to represent a committee of landholders as an agrarian candidate in Tafalla, losing again. No source mentions him as running in the last electoral campaign of the Restoration in 1923.

Sánchez Marco's relations with Integrism became somewhat loose; though some scholars refer to him as Jefe Provincial del Integrismo, at that time he was merely an honorary president of the Integrist Navarrese Junta. In 1921 he became a delegate of Dirección General de Agricultura, Minas y Montes in Navarre and continued at this position until the late-1920s, taking up jobs also in commercial companies. In the late 1920s he moved into a new house, designed by a noted Pamplona architect Víctor Eusa, and set in his Dehesa de San Juan estate near Milagro.

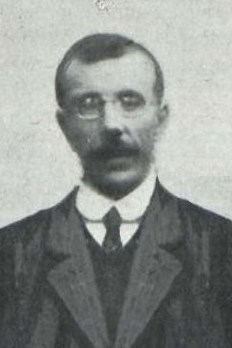
Portrait of Sánchez Marco

The 1923 advent of the Primo de Rivera dictatorship was greeted ambiguously by the Integrists, who welcomed doing away with rotten democracy but abhorred declaration of loyalty to the 1876 constitution, considered original sin of the Restoration system. Sánchez Marco was among those who tended to park their skepticism and in 1924 co-signed the founding manifesto of Unión Patriótica de Navarra. The document listed 3 pillars of their outlook: traditional values including religion, indivisible but regionalist state based on an organic constitution and enhancement of Navarrese identity in line with its foral rights. Access to primederiverista structures did not prevent his further engagement in Integrist initiatives, though he excelled rather in Catholic activities.

In 1927 Sánchez Marco was appointed as "destacado lider" to the primoderiverista quasi-parliament, Asamblea Nacional Consultiva, nominated member of the pool reserved for Representantes de Actividades de Vida Nacional. He signed up to seccion segunda of the Assembly, a committee dealing mostly with foreign policy, and indeed remained active within its ranks; very much like in the Restoration parliament, he also kept protesting invasion of indecency in public life. However, he was getting increasingly unhappy about a constitution draft, discussed in 1929; Sánchez Marco was particularly upset about its Article 11, invoking religious freedom and considered carbon copy from the despised 1876 constitution. Instead, he thought the moment a good opportunity to launch "política de bien, mejor", which all Catholics would support and defend.

== Carlist re-united (1931-1936) ==
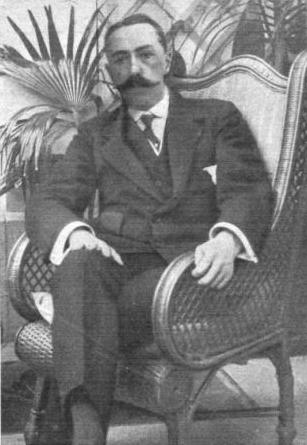
Don Jaime

During early months of the Republic Sánchez Marco joined efforts to mount a right-wing Navarrese coalition prior to the 1931 elections. Though 25 years earlier he boasted Navarre as part of the Vasco-Navarrese community, at that time he cautiously supported "sane regionalism" and was keen to keep the province out of Basque autonomous schemes. Hence, his activity was aimed at preventing radical Basque nationalists from joining the alliance and at highlighting its religious dimension. On the other hand, he had no doubts about closing ranks with the Jaimists, taking part in joint propaganda meetings with their leaders. Some scholars consider him key to successful emergence of candidatura católico-fuerista, though he did not run himself.

Most of his career is marked by conciliatory stance towards the Carlists and some scholars even consider him an opportunist. In mid-1931 Sánchez Marco went to great lengths seeking understanding with the movement he broke away from in 1888; he even made an unprecedented step of initiating vivas to the claimant, Don Jaime. Referred to as jefe del integrismo navarro, in early 1932 he wholeheartedly engaged in unification activities, which eventually brought the Integrists back to the legitimist camp. During a great Traditionalist unity gathering in Pamplona he appeared as one of key speakers and greeted the new claimant, Don Alfonso Carlos, as a joint of Traditionalist unity. However, Sánchez Marco did not assume any major post in the united organization, Comunión Tradicionalista, except seat in the board of its daily, El Siglo Futuro.

In the early 1930s the Integrists as a party and Sánchez Marco personally represented the most far-Right of the Spanish politics; there was no grouping standing more extreme to the Right. His public addresses fell only slightly short of open rebellion against the regime. He declared the Republic "daughter of a masonic plot", lambasted its secularist drive, especially expulsion of religious orders, measures against cardinal Segura and designs at obligatory secular education, and declared himself seeking to restore the glory of Spain in union between the Church and Monarchy. Sending numerous protest letters to various official bodies, as member of a Catholic deputation he was even admitted by president Alcala Zamora. It is not known whether he was anyhow engaged in the 1932 Sanjurjada, though in its aftermath he suffered brief detention in Pamplona.

Carlist standard

Sánchez Marco remained engaged in Catholic and Carlist propaganda efforts also during the 1933 elections, though compared to the previous campaign his activity was – perhaps due to his age - visibly reduced. In the mid-1930s engaged in religious initiatives like Navarrese pilgrimage to Rome, he did not refrain from joining also those flavored with a Christian-democratic spirit, speaking at rallies organized by ACNDP. However, he seemed most committed to numerous associations of landholders, endangered by agrarian reform; appearing as president of Navarrese section of various nationwide Agrarian Assemblies he was member of Confederación Española Patronal Agricola, Unión de Federaciones Católico Agrarias Vasco-Navarras and Asociación de Terratenientes de Navarra.

== Retiree (after 1936) ==
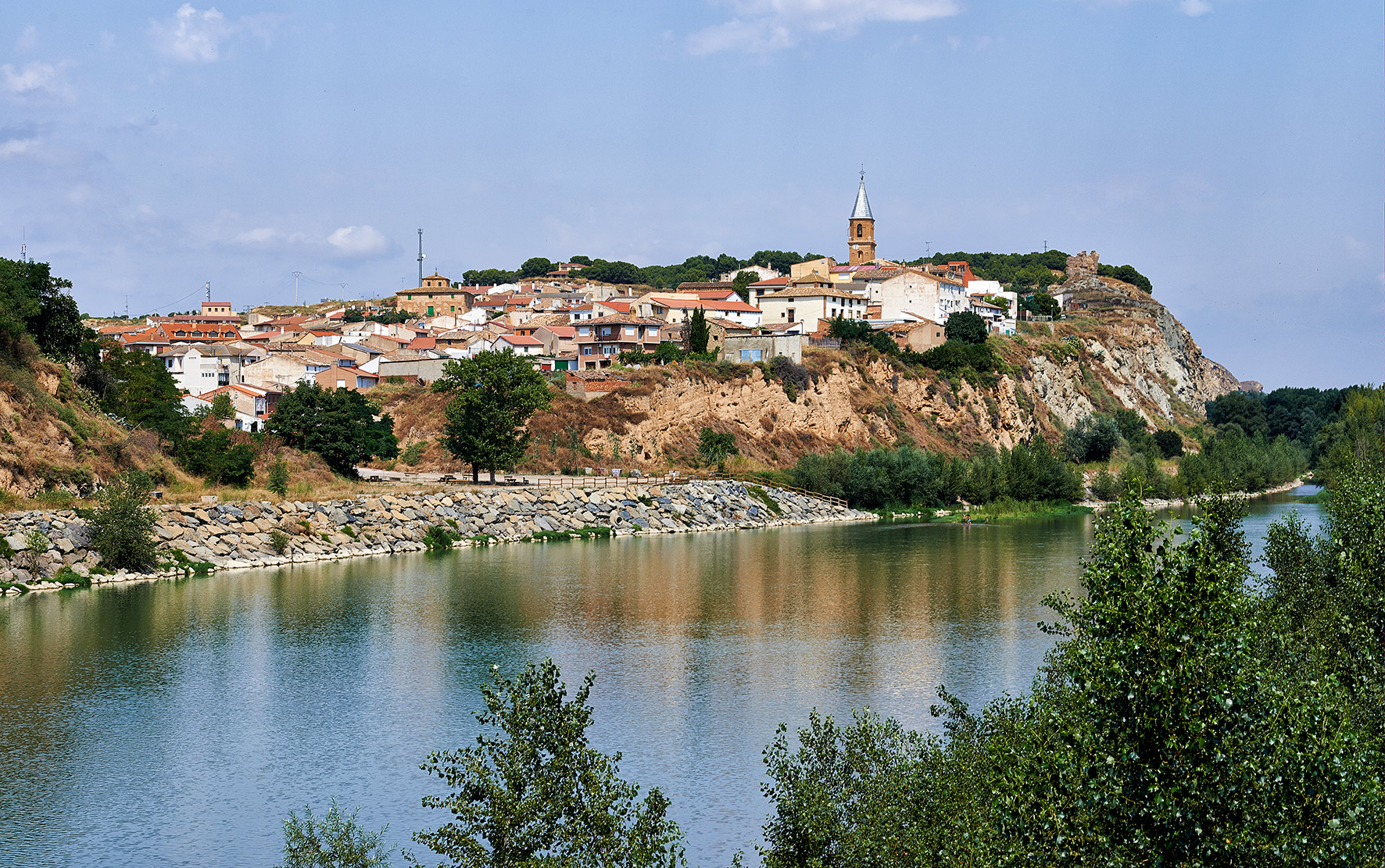
Milagro

It is not clear whether Sánchez Marco contributed to or was even aware of the Carlist gear-up to the 1936 coup. Since its early hours the city of Pamplona has been easily captured by the rebels and became sort of a capital of a Carlist fiefdom. However, nothing is known about any public engagements of Sánchez Marco either at that time or during the entire Civil War; he was rather casually mentioned by the Navarrese press only in relation to his son Antonio, a requeté officer, or in historical notes. He did not enter either Navarrese of national Carlist wartime executive bodies, Junta Central Carlista de Navarra and Junta Nacional Carlista de Guerra.

None of the sources consulted provides any information on his public activity during the early Francoist period; as a septuagenarian and since mid-1940s an octogenarian, due to his age he is likely to have withdrawn into privacy. In 1943 widowed by his wife, he spent his last years in between Pamplona and his estate in Milagro, surrounded by children and grandchildren. None of the nationwide papers acknowledged his death in 1949. He seems to have fallen into oblivion rather quickly; a 1953 hagiographical book dedicated to illustrious Navarrese personalities neither contains his entry nor mentions his name.

== See also ==
- Navarrese electoral Carlism during the Restoration
- Electoral Carlism (Restoration)
- Ramón Nocedal Romea
