= Juan Lamamié de Clairac =

Spanish politician and journalist (1831–1919)

Juan Lamamié de Clairac y Trespalacios
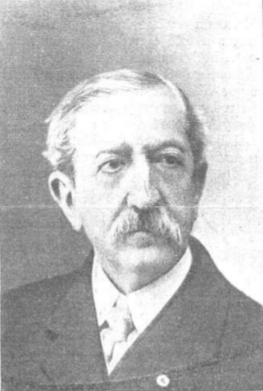

Member of the Congress of Deputies
- In office 15 November 1907 – 14 April 1910
- Constituency: Salamanca

Personal details
- Born: 24 June 1831 Salamanca, Spain
- Died: 19 October 1919 (aged 88) Salamanca, Spain
- Party: Comunión Tradicionalista, Integrist Party
- Children: José María Lamamié de Clairac y Colina and 7 more
- Education: University of Salamanca
- Occupation: Journalist and politician

Juan Lamamié de Clairac y Trespalacios (24 June 1831 – 19 October 1919) was a Spanish journalist and traditionalist politician.

== Biography ==
=== Family and youth ===
He descended from a noble family of French origin residing in Spain since the beginning of the 18th century. His father José Lamamié de Clairac y Tirado had been a colonel at the Royal Army and fought on the Northern campaign of the Napoleonic Wars under Pedro Caro y Sureda. His mother Jacinta Trespalacios y Ceballos was the first Salamancan victim of the 1834 Spanish cholera epidemic and died when Juan was 3 years old.

His father moved to Madrid and left him at Salamanca under his family guardianship, considering his infirm health and few expectations of survival were unfit for travelling. He lived with his aunt María Trespalacios and his uncle Manuel Mercado Dusmet, who had been a guerrilla fighter at the Spanish Independence War under Julián Sánchez. According to El Siglo Futuro, his aunt and uncle had followed the Carlist ideology since Clairac was a boy and transmitted their religious and political zeal to him. He was fully entrusted to them after the early death of his father, when Clairac was 16 years old.

He studied at the University of Salamanca, obtaining a bachelor's degree in philosophy in 1848, another in Jurisprudence in 1854 and later a licenciatura in 1856. He soon started his political activity and was elected a provincial deputy by the Alba de Tormes district in 1863.

=== Carlist political engagement ===
After the Revolution of 1868 he joined the Carlist army and during the Sexenio Revolucionario he was designated as subcomisario regio of the Salamanca province by pretender Carlos VII. He ran as a counter-revolutionary candidate for Salamanca at the 1869 Spanish general election despite the opposition of the governor of the province, joining the formula of cardinal Miguel García Cuesta, Antonio Aparisi y Guijarro, León Carbonero y Sol, Gaspar Escudero and Nicolás Gallego Sevillano. Cardinal García Cuesta would be the only Carlist candidate elected by Salamanca.

Clairac collected signatures for an exposition at the Spanish Cortes asking for the conservation of the Unidad católica de España, following the indications of the Asociación de Católicos (Catholics' Association) presided by his uncle, the marquis of Viluma. He managed to rise 93000 signatures from 381 towns in Salamanca against religious freedom, a merit for which he was chosen as president of the provincial directory of the Association the 7th July 1869. Clairac was also the founder of the Salamancan Catholic Youth, in which the famous politician Enrique Gil Robles started his career.

In April 1870 he took part in the Junta católico-monárquica of Vevey called by Don Carlos after the desertion of Ramón Cabrera, acting as a representative of Salamanca.

He was elected again a deputy in 1871 by the Salamanca district. The same year he was designated as president of the local Junta carlista de Armamento y Defensa (Carlist board of Arming and Defense) and was commissioned for one year to prepare the province for a future uprising. The Civil Guard imprisoned him in July 1872 along with other conspirers and sent him to the cárcel del Saladero at Madrid.

His family obtained his release thanks to their contacts at the government, but Clairac refused to abandon the prison if his companions were not freed as well. After achieving the release of all of them he promised the governor of Madrid Fernando Sartorius Chacón to abandon the country and go into exile abroad.

He took a ship at Santander and emigrated to Bayonne. Along with his wife Isabel Bermúdez de Castro he kept financing the Carlist rebels and gave economic support to those who were banished to France. In 1874 he was indulted after the coronation of Alfonso XII and could return to Spain. In 1876 he recovered his personal goods the government had seized. His wife would die the same year. He married Petra Celestina de la Colina y Fernández Cavada in 1882, with whom he had 8 children.

=== Integrist Party actions ===
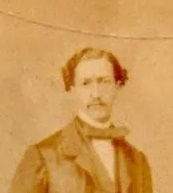
Juan Lamamié de Clairac

He sided with Ramón Nocedal and El Siglo Futuro in the conflict with La Fé that led to the Integrist separation of the Carlist movement. Clairac founded and financed La Tesis and La Tradición, two integrist newspapers co-edited with Enrique Gil Robles and Manuel Sánchez Asensio. He joined the Integrist Party in 1888. He would later found La Región (1890–1892) and La Información (1892–1897). He was also director of El Salmantino.

In 1901 he joined the Catholic Anti-Liberal League of Salamanca and campaigned intensely for Juan Antonio Sánchez del Campo, who would be elected a deputy by the Integrists in June of the same year.

In 1905 he was chosen as regional head of the Integrist Party at León, He started a general reorganization of the movement and set 75 provincial juntas with whom he attended the party assembly of 1906 dressed in traditional attires.

Clairac was particularly concerned with legitimizing the movement before the Holy See. In April 1894 he organized a pilgrimage of Spanish workers to Rome with the intention of showing the nation's support of Leo XIII, and in 1904 he traveled to Rome representing the Integrist Party among with other leaders who were received by Pope Pius X. Before travelling Clairac had collected at his province a large number of telegrams and messages in support of the Pope.

With the support of Juan Antonio Sánchez del Campo and Ramón Nocedal he took part in the 1907 Spanish general election and was elected a deputy despite the opposition of the local bishop Francisco Javier Valdés y Noriega, who supported the lesser of two evils principle and rejected Integralism. Two other Integrist candidates, Manuel Senante and José Sánchez Marco, were elected as well.

He was made a member of the party directory by the Assembly of Zaragoza after Nocedal's death. In 1908 he travelled to Rome in representation of the party and offered Pope Pius X to dissolve the organization and El Siglo Futuro if he considered it to be prejudicial for the situation of the Catholic Church in Spain.

He renounced to his deputy re-election to avoid antagonising with the local bishop, despite the party was approved by the Holy See. He still did not abandon politics and supported Integrist Mariano Arenillas Sáinz for his successful deputy candidacy, ending with the republican-socialist majority in the municipality.

In spite of his old age, the Integrist Assembly of 1918 re-elected him as the party head of León. He supported the candidacy of his son José María, who was not elected that time but would later become a deputy thrice during the Second Spanish Republic. Clairac died at Salamanca the following year.

== Bibliography ==
- Pérez de Olaguer, Antonio (1939). Piedras vivas. Biografía del capellán requeté José María Lamamié de Clairac y Alonso. San Sebastián. pp. 22–32.
