= Cárcel Modelo =

Former Spanish prison

Coordinates: 41.3829°N 2.1430°E

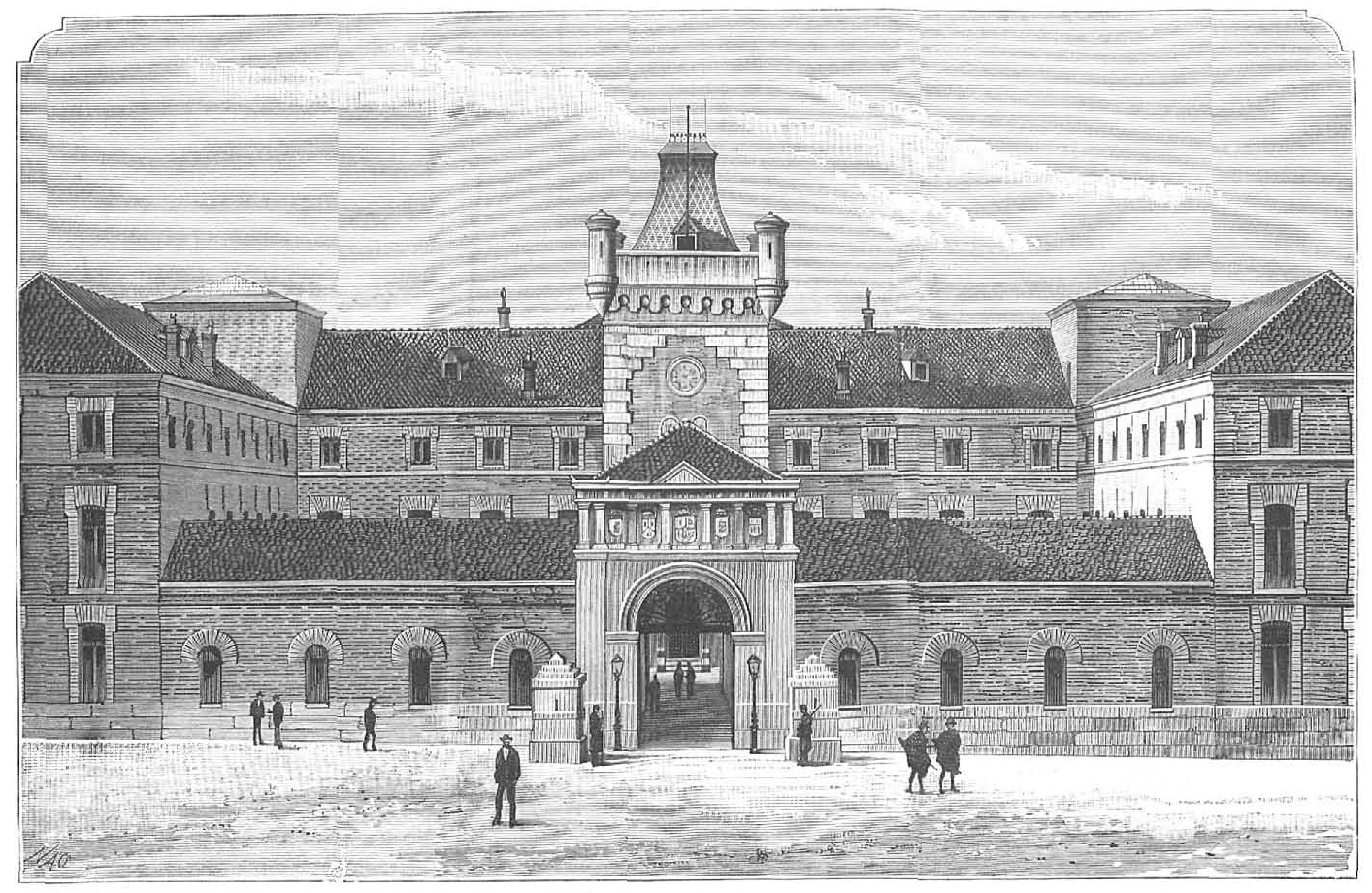
- Main facade of the prison, 1883
- Interactive map of Cárcel Modelo

Cárcel Modelo, also known as Cárcel Celular, was the main prison for men in Madrid at the turn of the 20th century. Located in the Moncloa-Aravaca district, it was inaugurated in 1884 after seven years of construction and replaced the 18th century Cárcel del Saladero. The name "Modelo" derived from its standing as a model for other Spanish prisons. The prison operated through 1939, when it was shuttered and demolished after being damaged during the Spanish Civil War.

== History ==
The Saladero prison no longer offered sanitary conditions, and the Madrid municipality aimed to build another prison on the outskirts of Madrid. One of the first architectural projects for the new building, to be located on Alberto Aguilera Street, was presented by architect Bruno Fernández de los Ronderos in 1860; but this new prison was never built. However, his plans served as inspiration for the prison that would later be built in Moncloa, already influenced by the architectural theories of Jeremy Bentham.

== See also ==
- Cárcel Modelo massacre
