= José María Lamamié de Clairac y Colina =

Spanish politician (1887–1956)

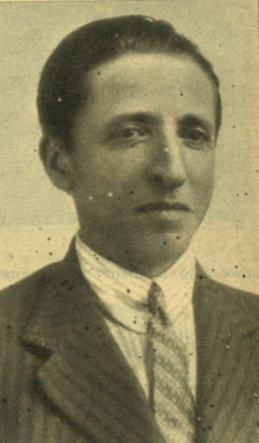
- Born: 1887; Salamanca, Spain
- Died: 1956 (aged 68–69); Salamanca, Spain
- Occupation: landowner
- Known for: politician
- Political party: Integrism, Carlism

José María Lamamié de Clairac y Colina (1887-1956) was a Spanish politician. He supported the Traditionalist cause, until the early 1930s as an Integrist and afterwards as a Carlist. Among the former he headed the regional León branch, among the latter he rose to nationwide executive and became one of the party leaders in the late 1930s and the 1940s. In 1931-1936 he served 2 terms in the Cortes; in 1915-1920 he was member of the Salamanca ayuntamiento. In historiography he is known mostly as representative of Castilian terratenientes; as president of Confederación Nacional Católico-Agraria he tried to preserve the landowner-dominated rural regime, first opposing the Republican and later the Francoist designs.

== Family and youth ==
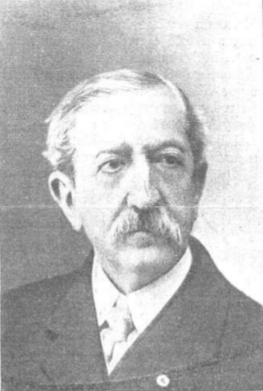
Integrist politician Juan Lamamié de Clairac, his father

The Lamamiés originated from the French Languedoc; Etienne La Mamye de Clairac was a military and held high administrative posts in Flanders in the late 17th century. His son arrived in Spain with Felipe de Anjou in the 1720s and became known as Claudio Lamamié de Clairac y Dubois; he served on various military command posts during the following 4 decades. Claudio’ son Miguel Lamamié de Clairac y Villalonga was the first to settle on estates granted to him near Salamanca in the late 18th century. His son and the grandfather of José María, José Ramón Lamamié de Clairac y Tirado (1784-1847), a military like his ancestors, fought against the French during Napoleonic Wars; though he massively benefitted from liberal desamortización, he turned a Carlist supporter when senile. His son and the father of José María, Juan Lamamié de Clairac y Trespalacios (1831-1919), was among the largest provincial landowners. Detained for plotting a legitimist rising, he returned from exile in the 1870s; he then owned numerous Carlist provincial periodicals. In the 1880s Lamamié joined the breakaway Integrist branch of Traditionalism and was its regional León jefé; in 1907-1910 he served as Integrist MP in the Cortes and entered the national party executive.

Following childless death of his wife, in 1882 Lamamié de Clairac y Trespalacios remarried with Celestina de la Colina Fernández-Cavada (1859-1946), the native of Burgos. The couple had at least 8 children, born when the father was in his 50s and 60s; 4 of them died in early infancy. José María was born as the third son, but as his oldest brother perished and the second oldest became a religious, it was him who inherited the family wealth. Some sources suggest he received early education in the Salamanca Instituto General y Técnico, others maintain that he frequented Seminario de Salamanca, then studied with “los jesuítas en Comillas”, and obtained bachillerato in the Jesuit Valladolid college in or around 1905. He then studied law in Valladolid and graduated with excellent marks in 1909; some sources mention also his agricultural education.

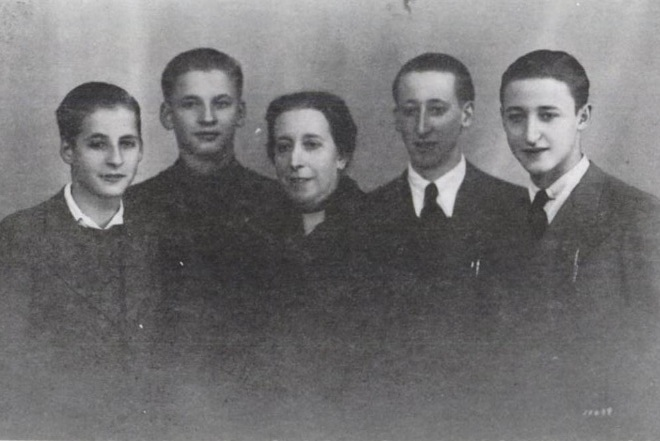
Sofía Alonso Moreno, Clairac's wife, surrounded by his sons

In 1910 Lamamié married a local girl, Sofía Alonso Moreno (1887-1970); she came from the local bourgeoisie family. They settled at Lamamié family estate in the Salamanca province, in-between Alba de Tormes and Babilafuente. Though Lamamié is often referred in historiography as “rico ganadero y terrateniente” or “grande terrateniente” it is not clear what the actual size of his estates was. Various sources claim that the couple had 9 to 11 children. Raised in the very religious ambience, at least 6 of them joined religious orders; some served in America, some grew to local prominence and one son was killed as a requeté chaplain in 1937. The family heir Tomás Lamamié de Clairac Alonso did not become a public figure, though he held high executive functions in SEAT and other companies. Neither the Lamamié de Clairac Delgado nor the Liaño Pacheco Lamamié grandchildren grew to prominence; the best known, Pilar Lamamié de Clairac Delgado, is a pediatrician.

== Early public activity ==
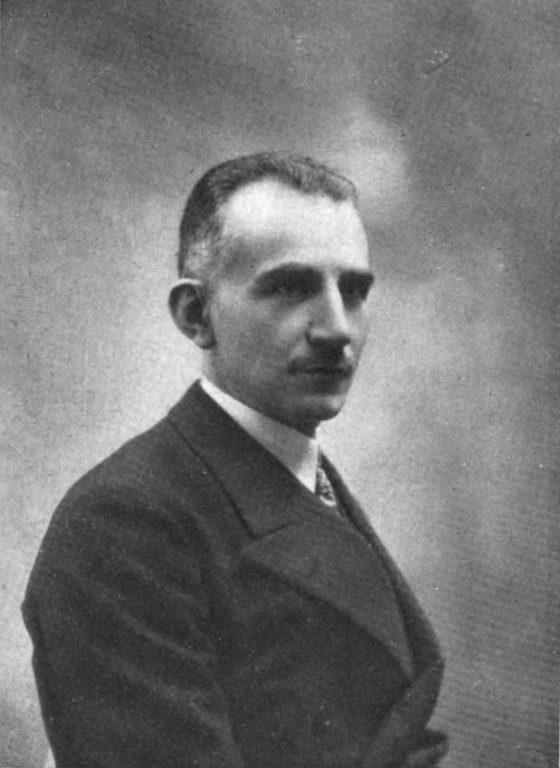
Ángel Herrera Oria

In 1904-1906 as a teenager Lamamié signed various open letters, usually protesting alleged official anti-Catholic measures or publicly professing Christian faith. He earned his name in history books already in 1908, when within a group of equally young 9 signatories – including Ángel Herrera Oria - he co-founded Asociación Católica Nacional de Jóvenes Propagandistas, later known as ACNDP. Indeed, in 1909-1914 he engaged in Catholic propaganda, noted e.g. when speaking at local Catholic rallies, entering committees which co-ordinated religious projects, greeting bishops, featuring prominently at local feasts or contributing to El Salmantino daily. Some of these engagements were increasingly flavored with “propaganda católico-social”. Some time in the 1910s Lamamié left ACNDP, accusing them of "betraying the Catholic cause".

In the early 1910s Lamamié opened his own law desk in Madrid, though little is known of its activity; he remained active in the Salamanca family wheat business. At that time he was already vice-president of the local branch of the Integrist organisation. In the mid-1910s approaching the right-wing Maurista faction of the Conservatives, in 1915 he decided to run on the Integrist ticket to the town hall and was elected with no opposing candidate standing. In the ayuntamiento he was counted among representatives of the extreme right and one of the most intelligent concejales at the same time. As the only Integrist councilor he tended to alliance with Maurista, but also Jaimista members. Press notes present him as an active and belligerent politician, concerned primarily with economic issues; given heavy debt burden of the city and financial problems ensuing, in 1917 he supported governmental nomination of a new alcalde. In the late 1910s Lamamié already presided over work of some municipal committees. He was initially supposed to run for re-election; however, for reasons which remain unclear and were probably related to failed coalition talks he withdrew from the race and ceased as concejal in 1920.

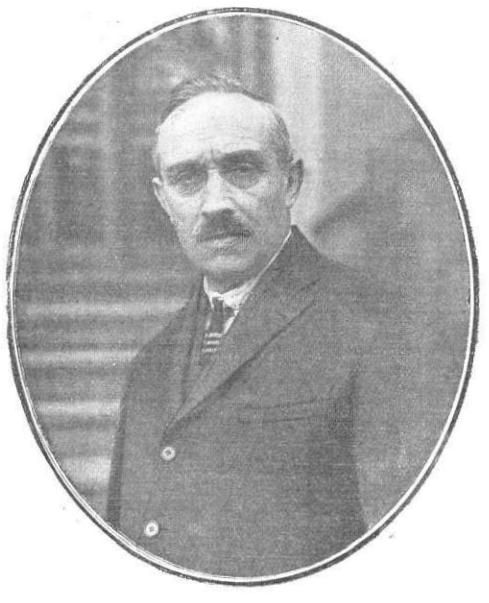
Integrist leader Olazábal

Already in the late 1910s and thanks to his connections to Integrist parliamentarians like Manual Senante, Lamamié's proposals ended up at ministerial desks. In 1918 he tried to enter nationwide politics himself; following in the footsteps of his father, he decided to run for the Cortes as an Integrist candidate from the district of Salamanca. In all boroughs he trashed the left-wing candidate Miguel de Unamuno, but by a slight margin he was himself defeated by a Liberal Romanonista candidate; this did not prevent his supporters from claiming “triunfo moral”. In the early elections called for 1919 Lamamié tried his hand again. Though he was known as councilor, local landowner, son to former deputy, Integrist, zealous Catholic propagandist and activist of local agrarian syndicates he lost again; this time he was decisively defeated by a former military who ran as an independent Conservative candidate. He was not noted as renewing his efforts in last elections of the Restoration era in the early 1920s; he welcomed the 1923 Primo coup enthusiastically.

== In agricultural organisations ==
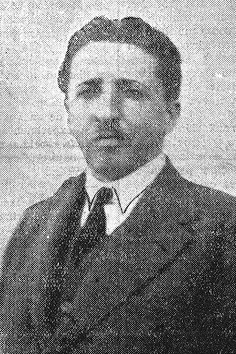
Lamamié, 1920s

Already in 1918 Lamamié was vice-president of local Salmantine federation of agrarian syndicates. After death of his father the following year he inherited most of the family estates and became “one of the largest landowners in the Salamanca district”. Since the early 1920s he engaged heavily in works of local agricultural organisations; formally they posed as representing all rural stakeholders, but were usually dominated by landholders and adhered to the Catholic social doctrine. The key one was Federación Católica Agrícola, renamed later to Federación Católico-Agraria Salmantina; rising to its president, since 1921 Lamamié represented the organization in the provincial Cámara Agricola. In 1923 he rose beyond the province as he became one of the leaders of confederation of agrarian syndicates in the region of León; in 1925 it evolved into Confederación Nacional Católico-Agraria de las Federaciones Castellano Leonesas.

As representative of agrarian organizations he lobbied at various official administrative and self-governmental bodies, like Consejo Provincial de Fomento and regional institutions; already a recognized personality, at official feasts at times he spoke right after the civil governor. In 1925 latest he was nominated comisario regio de fomento, a provincial delegate of Ministry of Infrastructure; the same year he grew to president of Federación de Sindicatos Católicos. In 1927 Lamamié was in executive of Unión Católico Agraria Castellano Leonesa; he tried to endorse its vision of rural regime and took part in Congreso Nacional Cerealista; also during following years he used to give lectures on organisation of agricultural labor. In the late 1920s he focused on presidency of Federación Católico Agraria Salmantina and activity in Acción Social Católico Agraria. He formed part of Comisíon Trigueroharinaria within Comisión Arbitral Agrícola, a primoderiverista arbitration committee supervised by Ministry of Agriculture, and was member of Cámara de la Propiedad Rústica. He grew to vice-president of Confederación Hidrográfica del Duero, but scaled down his activity as a lawyer.

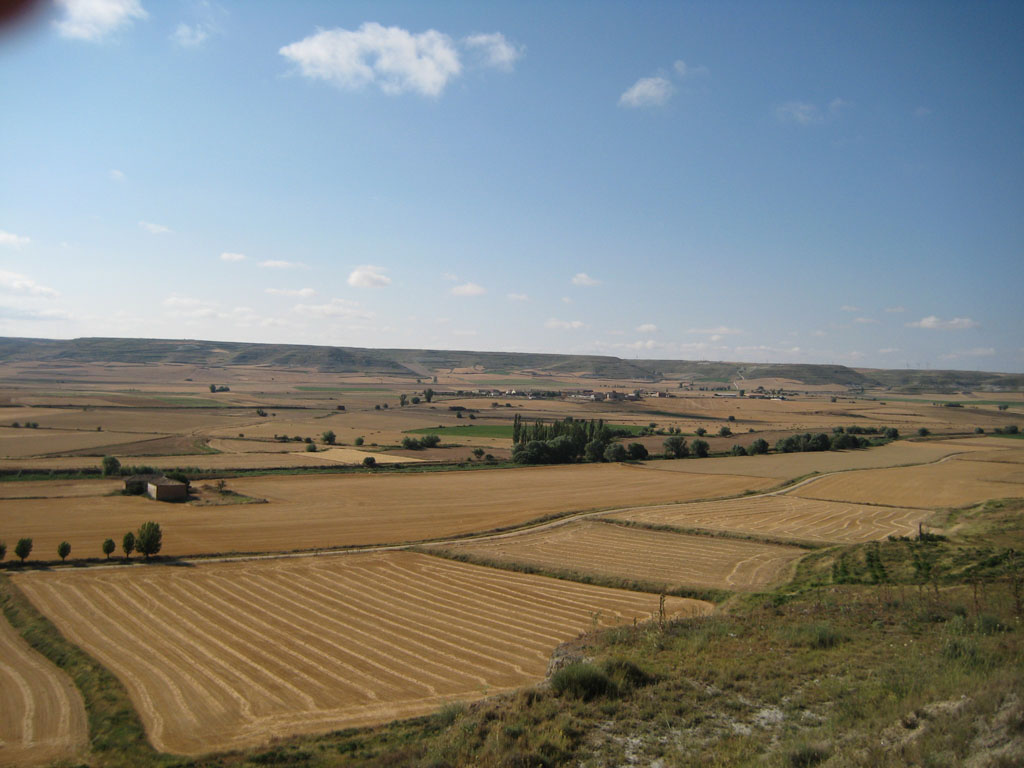
Wheat fields, Castile

Following the fall of Primo Lamamié assumed more militant political stand; in 1930 he agonized about “grave situation in agriculture” and demanded permanent consultative representation of landowners’ federations in Madrid; indeed he was shortly nominated member of Consejo del Economia Nacional. On first pages he claimed that rural syndicates did not intend to engage in politics, but on the other hand when representing “labrador castellano” they looked beyond purely agricultural interest. In June he co-founded Acción Castellana, supposed to promote “aspiraciones nacionales y agrarias”, though he also appeared on meetings of Partido Provincial Agrario. He called to do away with ruling corrupted oligarchies, but opposed the rising republican tide by lambasting “false liberties and democratic absurdities”; according to his vision, Castile as the heart of Spain remembered that “en primer término Dios”. In September he declared running to the future Cortes in name of Sindicatos Católicos Agrarios, but in February 1931 specified he would rather stand in name of Acción Castellana. In April 1931 he was elected president of Confederación Nacional Católico-Agraria, the nationwide agricultural organization.

== Republic: in Cortes ==
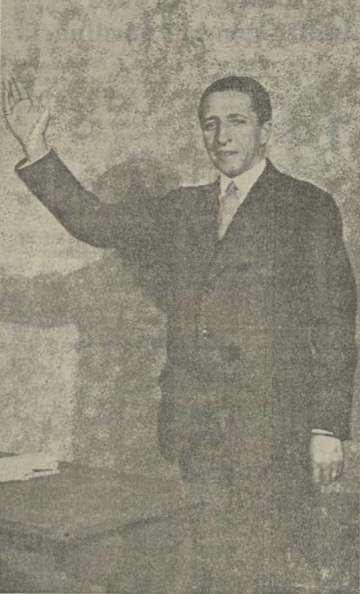
Lamamié circa 1930

As representative of Acción Castellana Lamamié joined a general right-wing alliance and was comfortably elected to the first Republican Cortes from his Salamanca. In the chamber he joined the Agrarian block; with 2 other Integrists he formed the right-wing or “extreme right-wing” of the grouping. As a Carlist he was re-elected from Salamanca in 1933 and 1936; in the latter case the ticket was annulled with his engagement in negotiation of government grain contracts quoted as incompatible with electoral law. The 5 years spend in the Cortes marked the climax of Lamamié's career; though member of minor groupings, he became a nationally recognizable figure due to his oratory skills, vehemence and engagement in heated plenary debates. His parliamentary career was marked by two threads: opposition to republican agrarian policy and opposition to advanced secular format of the state.

Lamamié “emerged as the most ardent Catholic opponent of state interference with the distribution of landed property” and did his best to block the agrarian reform; some count him among “defensores a ultranza de las viejas estructuras territoriales”. Though Lamamié recognized the need to sanate the rural regime following “a century of rural liberalism”, he thought the republican law an over-reaction, “an even worse doctrine which converts us all into slaves of the state”. Especially in 1933-1935 he labored to loosen already adopted rural regulations like the law on jurados mixtos or the Rural Lease Act. Though he lambasted alleged etatisme of Giménez Fernández, at times he swallowed his “dislike of state intervention” and demanded governmental assistance by purchases of wheat surplus. Lamamié gained notoriety when left-wing newspapers quoted his declaration that he would turn a schismatic rather than accept land reform in case it gets supported by the Church; the claim is referred in literature as a proof of Lamamié's hypocrisy, but some claim it was fabricated by hostile propaganda. The member of radical right-wing among the Agrarians, also among the Carlists he stood as “last-ditch defender of property” against left-leaning party parliamentarians like Ginés Martinez Rubio.

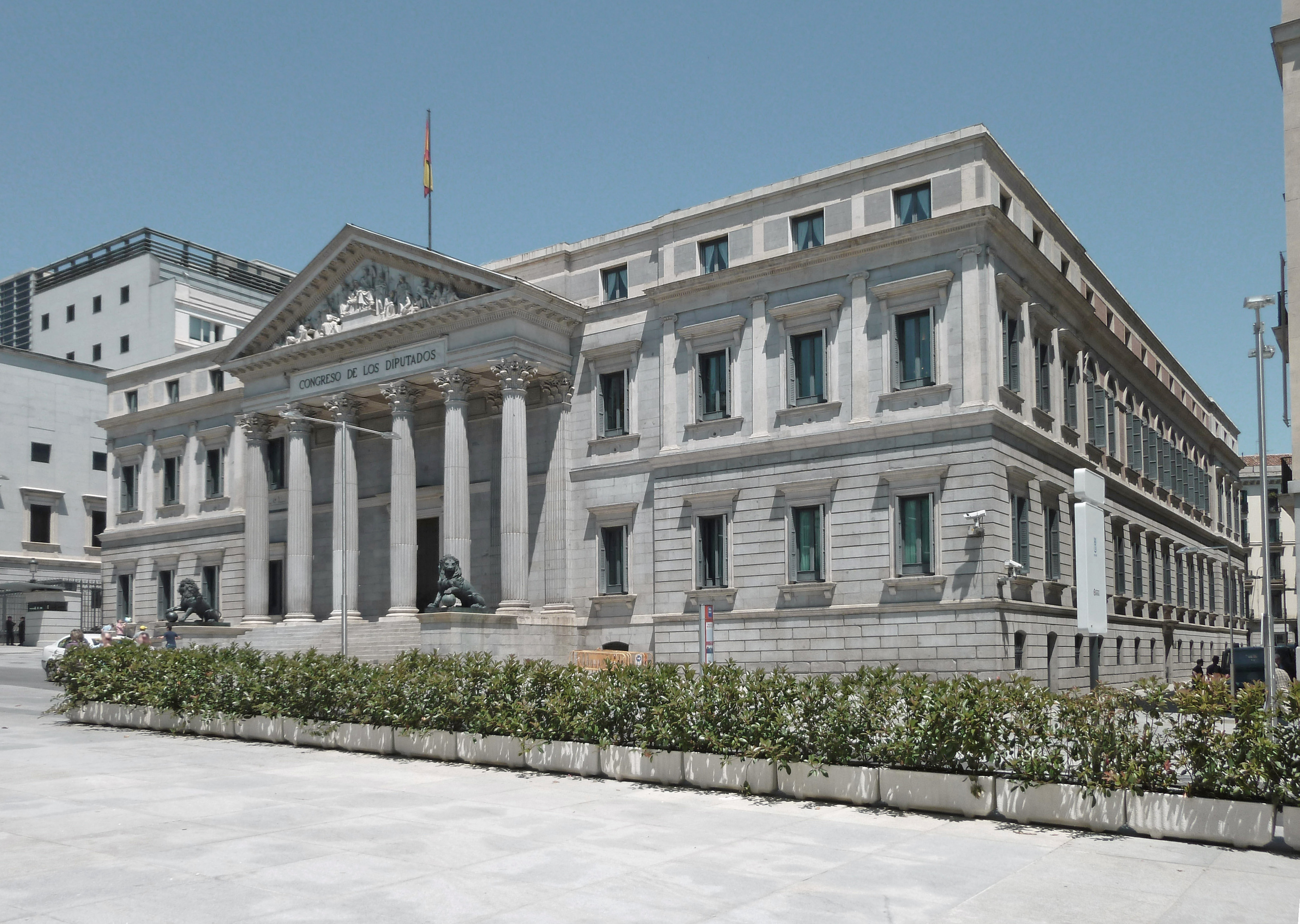
Parliament building (present view)

Another major focus of Lamamié as a deputy were religious issues. He vehemently supported confessionality of state and claimed that “God comes first, and not merely relegated to the privacy of conscience”. During the constitutional debate of 1931 he ardently opposed stipulations he considered oppressive and unjust versus the Catholics, warning that if the state turns against them, they “shall have no other remedy than to move against the Republic”. Lamamié dedicated not one of his harangues to defend the Jesuits, the order marked for forcible dissolution; he tried to dismantle the republican narrative of the famous Jesuit “fourth vow” and lambasted the draft not only as inhuman, but also as non-constitutional; his campaign lasted until 1933, but proved fruitless. Numerous timed denied the right to speak, he later got his parliamentary addresses published as a booklet. During the 1933-1936 term, dominated by the Right, he demanded nothing less than derogation of the constitutional article which defined the Republic as a secular state.

== Republic: in Carlist executive ==
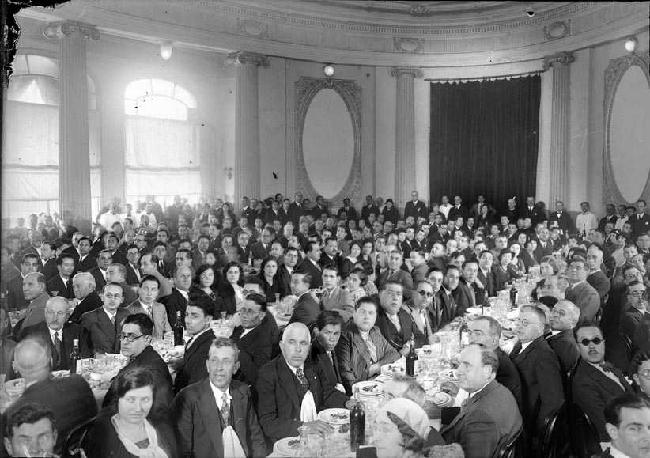
Carlist gathering, 1930s

Lamamié entered the Republican parliament as an Integrist associated with Salamantine agrarian and generic right-wing circles, but already in late 1931 he was at odds with local conservatives. Instead, like most Integrists he started to approach the Carlists and was leaning towards reunification of all Traditionalist branches. The project was complete in early 1932, when they merged in Comunión Tradicionalista. Within the organisation Lamamié entered its nationwide executive Junta Suprema and became secretary of the body; he was also double-hatting as regional Traditionalist jefé in León. In 1933 latest he was put in charge of the propaganda section and reportedly contributed to change of Carlist image; the movement was no longer perceived as antiquated group of senile veterans but as a dynamic organization of young militants. Though at times speaking at public rallies, he turned into “the most persuasive and accomplished Carlist orator” in the Cortes. He went well with older generation of leaders, especially the fellow landowner Rodezno, and following re-organisation of 1934 he entered not only the broad Junta Suprema Nacional, but also a much smaller governing body, Junta Delegada.

Already in the early 1930s Lamamié worked with the fellow Integrist Manuel Fal and reportedly claimed the latter would one day become the party leader. Following growing disappointment with Rodezno's lead, in 1934 he and Manuel Senante floated the candidacy of Fal, who indeed assumed the party jefatura. Under his command Lamamié retained his position as head of propaganda and in 1935 was nominated to Council of the Communion, an advisory body supposed to assist Fal. Since the mid-1930s he was gradually replacing Rodezno as the Carlist parliamentary leader. In the party he was one of the central figures who “could be relied upon to bridge the gap between the Communion old and new establishments”.

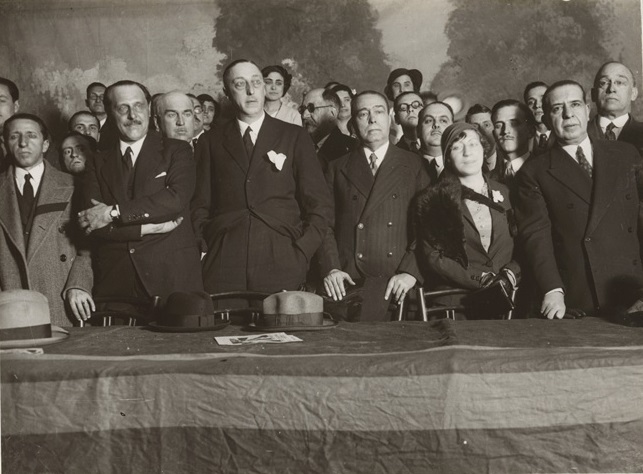
Lamamié at Carlist rally, 1930s (1fL)

Though some scholars admit that initially Lamamié might have been willing to collaborate with the Republican authorities, adopted “una postura suave y conciliadora” and only after 1933 turned into “integrista furibundo”, they note that it did not take long before he started to view the Republic as a tyrannical regime to be toppled sooner or later. He considered democracy incompatible with "people's rights". Since late 1931 he was increasingly critical of right-wing politics guided by the “lesser evil” principle and hence abandoned Acción Castellana in late 1932. Since then he scorned CEDA for illusions about rectifying the Republic and in 1934 claimed that the CEDA-backed government gave in to Lerroux and the Left. In 1935 he engaged in virulent press polemics with his former protégé José María Gil-Robles and was denounced by El Debate as running against the papal teaching; in spite of it, in 1936 he half-heartedly assisted Fal in attempt to mount a right-wing electoral alliance. While hostile to cedistas he was moderately in favor of a generic monarchist alliance within National Bloque. As former Integrist he was not outspoken on dynastical issues, though he stayed fully within limits of the Carlist loyalty.

== Conspirator and rebel ==
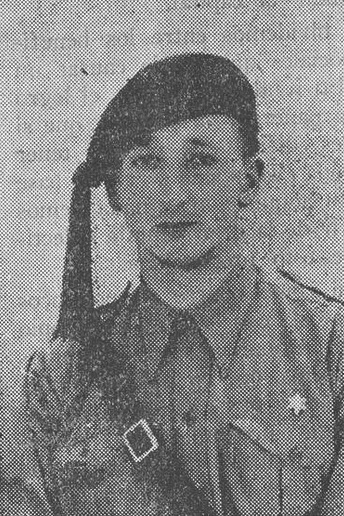
Son as requeté

Since the electoral triumph of Popular Front in February 1936 Lamamié was increasingly perplexed about perceived revolutionary tide and inclined towards mounting a counter-action. In the early spring he “nursed a longing for a purely Carlist rising”, prepared but eventually abandoned by the Comunión executive. However, he remained heavily engaged in conspiracy; together with dynastical representative Don Javier and Manuel Fal he formed a triumvirate which co-ordinated works of all sections of the organization. Though he did not speak with military conspirators, he negotiated with Gil-Robles; as late as on July 12 in Saint-Jean-de-Luz the two fruitlessly discussed CEDA's access to the coup. It is not clear where Lamamié resided on July 18–19, yet it is known that his wife and some sons remained in Madrid.

On July 26 Lamamié delivered an address broadcast by the Burgos radio; he called to support "sacrosant crusade" against "horde of evil-doers at the service of Russia". In response his Madrid bank account was seized and Republican press claimed a machine gun and loads of ammunition had been found in his safety deposit box. During August he toured various cities in Northern Castile encouraging recruitment and visiting requeté units. In September he entered the newly formed wartime party executive Junta Nacional Carlista de Guerra as its secretary. With his office based in Burgos, Lamamié was also entrusted with recruitment and deployment of requeté. He seemed to have stood in-between Fal Conde and somewhat autonomous Navarrese command, Junta Central Carlista. Some authors claim he was among Fal's less dependable trustees, though this enabled him to engage in some fence-mending between the two Carlist Juntas. When Fal was forced to go on exile the power in the party technically rested with Valiente and Lamamié, though in fact it slipped to traditional leaders from Navarre and the Vascongadas. In December he was confirmed as member of the re-organized 8-member Junta Nacional. He cultivated the usual propaganda tasks, but was entrusted also with running Sección Administrativa.

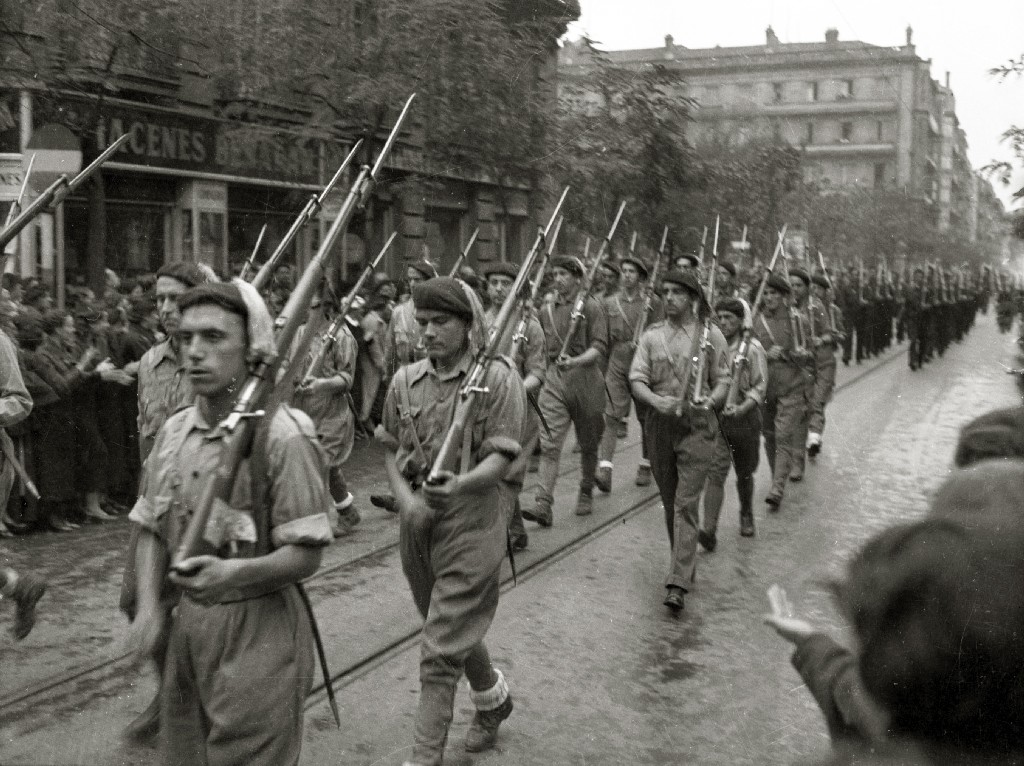
Requetés, 1937

Lamamié was increasingly puzzled by the emerging Franco's heavy-handed rule. In early 1937 he intervened with general Dávila to get Fal Conde released from exile; the plea was to no avail. In February he took part in the crucial Insua meeting, where Carlist leaders and their regent discussed the threat of military-imposed political amalgamation. His stand is not clear; highly skeptical about forced unification, he did not voice decisively against it, which did not spare him particular personal animadversion in the Franco headquarters. One contemporary historian counts him among “two of the most persistent fence-sitters” and another locates him “entre un polo y el otro” of the Carlist command layer. In early April he engaged in fruitless last-minute talks with Falangist leaders, staged to agree a bottom-up alliance. Eventually when faced with the military unification dictate he grudgingly opted for compliance, assuming that in case something goes wrong, “our Sacred Cause would always be reborn out of its own ashes”.

== Restless sansidrino ==
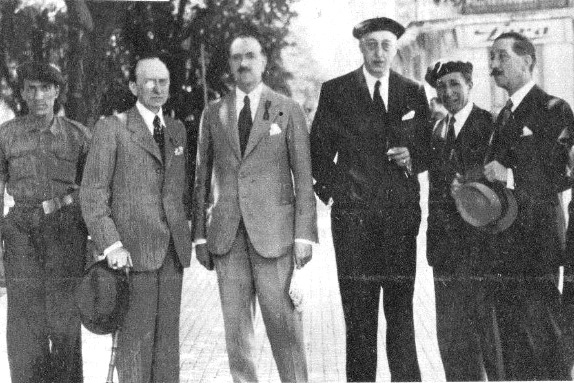
In Burgos, 1937 (2fR)

Don Javier considered Lamamié fully loyal and authorized him to enter ruling bodies of the unificated state party, but he preferred to tone down his political engagements. Instead, he resumed activity in agricultural organisations, in particular Confederación Nacional Católico Agraria, which he still presided. Because of its acronymic name CNCA, Lamamié and other of its top lobbyists were named "sansidrinos". Already in June 1937 they staged a grand Asamblea Cerealista in Valladolid; Lamamié was confirmed in presidency of CNCA and president of one of its components, Confederación Católico Agraria. Relations with the emerging Francoist regime remained correct; the traditional confederative structure was affiliated within the newly established national syndicalist Servicio Nacional de Trigo and both organizations declared total mutual understanding. In late 1937 Lamamié personally obtained some unspecified contracts in the Salamanca province and in March 1938 the Interior decree nominated him governor of the Burgos-based Banco de Crédito Local de España, a bank entrusted with financial aid to municipalities taken over from the Republicans.

Throughout 1938 CNCA and the national syndicalist Francoist administration were increasingly at a collision course, both advancing competitive visions of the rural regime. The first battleground was Catalonia, where on areas seized by the Nationalists the traditional local body, Instituto Agricola Catalan de San Isidro, tried to reassert its domination. CNCA backed its claims and argued that they in no way interfered with officially declared vertical syndicates; a stalemate ensued. However, in October 1938 the government issued Ley de Cooperativas, which left the sansidrinos profoundly disappointed. In April 1939 CNCA demanded that clear rules of the newly established Servicio Nacional de Cooperativas get published and underlined that traditional rural organizations did not enter SNC awaiting the moment it is legally defined. Lamamié issued declarations which in a veiled way warned against arbitrary ministerial decisions, advocated co-existence of state and private bodies, and called for recognition of 3-layer rural organizations. During 1939 and 1940 CNCA claimed it could operate “sin rozar la función de los Sindicatos verticales” and fought marginalization.

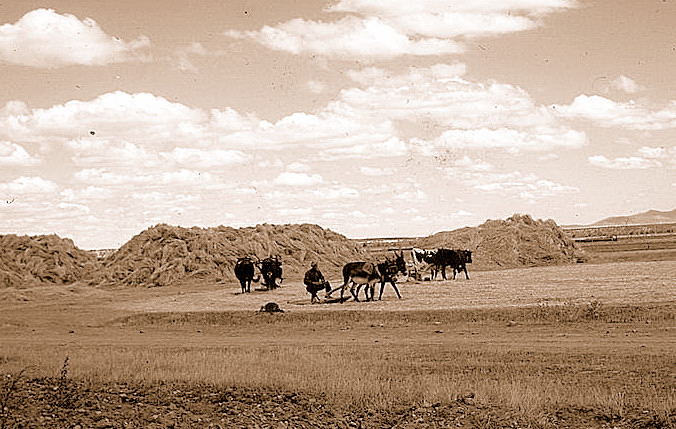
Working the fields, early Francoism

In the early 1940s militant syndicalist Falangism enjoyed its climax in the Francoist Spain; it translated also into outcome of power struggle within the rural agricultural ambience. Despite repeated declarations of loyalty on part of CNCA and numerous assurances that in no way it posed a thread to syndical law, conservative and Christian agrarians were getting increasingly pushed into the sidelines; also Lamamié lost steam and at one point admitted in relation to planned new regulations that “no tuvo ningún reparo que objetas sino por el contario le pareció muy bien”. In September 1940 he left the CNCA presidency and declarations of their meeting with Delegación Nacional de Sindicatos sounded like admitting defeat. With Lamamié as honorary president CNCA was ultimately dissolved and incorporated into the new Unión Nacional de Cooperativas del Campo in 1942. Lamamié kept presiding over Banco Exterior de Crédito Local de España at least until the early 1940s.

== Late Carlist activity ==
Carlist standard

At the turn of the decades Lamamié was barely noted officially for Carlist political activity, though he did participate in Traditionalism-flavored religious services or other rallies. He used to take part in confidential meetings; in 1940 when returning from such a session with a carlo-francoist general Ricardo Rada he suffered a car accident and barely managed to dispose of related potentially damaging documentation before the Guardia Civil patrol arrived. The same year he corresponded with Director General de Seguridad protesting repressions against Carlist militants in various provinces, e.g. in Ciudad Real, Salamanca, Murcia and Palma de Mallorca; on another front, he conferred about keeping the Alfonsists in check. In 1941 Lamamié supplied Don Javier with his political analysis, but its content is not known. During the climax of the Nazi might in Europe he advocated a neutral Spanish policy and declared that individual Carlists were free to enlist to División Azul, but Comuníon would in no way endorse the recruitment. In another letter, sent 1942, he protested to Ramón Serrano Suñer against official measures applied to Fal Conde. In 1943 he co-signed a large document addressed to Franco and known as Reclamación de Poder; its Carlist signatories called to do away with syndicalist features and to introduce a traditionalist monarchy.

Though maintaining correct formal relations with official administration, in the mid-1940s Lamamié counted among moderate anti-Francoists; during a 1944 monarchist gathering which included also the Alfonsists he voted against mounting a coup, intended to topple the caudillo. In 1945 he participated in a clandestine San Sebastián meeting with Don Javier; in 1947 he took part in the first session of Carlist executive since the 1937 Insua session and entered the re-established 5-member Consejo Nacional. At times he published in semi-clandestine Carlist bulletings, though not under his own name. In support of the moderately anti-Francoist falcondista strategy he opposed the vehemently anti-Francoist sivattista line, increasingly visible in the late 1940s. In the early 1950s as secretary of the Carlist executive he prepared documentation supposed to back the royal claim of Don Javier, who until then had posed as a regent and did not advance explicit monarchical claims; he edited the final version of the declaration, made by the claimant during the Eucharistic Congress in Barcelona in 1952. At that time he was already suffering from bad health and in the early 1950s he used a wheelchair; however, in 1954 he accepted membership in the renewed party Junta Nacional and its acting governing body Comisión Permanente. In the mid-1950s the Carlist stand versus the regime changed from opposition to cautious co-operation; it was sealed by dismissal of Fal Conde and by José María Valiente assuming political leadership. The latter still considered Lamamié a loyal “hombre firme y enérgico” and sounded him upon assuming secretariat of the ruling party junta. In 1956 Lamamié replied that though sick, he was ready to offer his name as “una garantía absoluta de defensa de la Causa”; his death came earlier.

== See also ==
- Integrism (Spain)
- Carlism
- Traditionalism (Spain)
