= Manuel Giménez Fernández =

Spanish politician (1896–1968)

Vice President of the Congress of Deputies
- In office 16 May 1935 – 7 January 1936

Minister of Agriculture
- In office 4 October 1934 – 3 April 1935
- President: Niceto Alcalá-Zamora
- Prime Minister: Alejandro Lerroux
- Preceded by: Juan José Benayas
- Succeeded by: Cirilo del Río Rodríguez

Member of the Congress of Deputies
- In office 30 November 1933 – 7 January 1936
- Constituency: Badajoz
- In office 20 February 1936 – 2 February 1939
- Constituency: Segovia

Personal details
- Born: Manuel de Jesús, Benito, Miguel y Consolación de la Santísima Trinidad Giménez Fernández; May 6, 1896 Seville, Kingdom of Spain
- Died: February 27, 1968 (aged 71) Seville, Spanish State
- Resting place: Cemetery of San Fernando, Seville Spain
- Party: CEDA
- Spouse: Ana María Clavijo Peñarrocha (m. 1921–1953)
- Children: 8
- Education: University of Madrid

Manuel Giménez Fernández (May 6, 1896, Seville - February 27, 1968) was a Spanish professor of canon law and politician most famous as Minister of Agriculture in the government of Alejandro Lerroux.

== Biography ==
In 1922, he began his political career as councilman in the municipal government of Seville, and later, september 1923, serving as its deputy mayor, during Primo de Rivera dictatorship, until 1927.

Giménez Fernández was named Professor of Canon Law at the University of Seville in 1930.

After the creation of the Second Spanish Republic, Giménez Fernández was elected to parliament by the constituency of Badajoz in the 1933 elections and subsequently joined the CEDA aligning himself with its liberal and progressive wing. Minister of Agriculture from October 4, 1934 to April 3, 1935 in the government headed by Alejandro Lerroux its policy of moderate agrarian reforms would force his resignation when they provoked bitter attack from elements within the Cortes including the conservative wing of the CEDA. He prepared and had approved by the Cortes the " Law of Ploughmen " (1934) and the "Law of Country Rents". José María Lamamié de Clairac and Cándido Casanueva were among Giménez Fernández's most vehement opponents taking particular exception to draft legislation giving tenants of twelve years standing the right to buy the lands they worked.

In the 1936 elections he was again elected to parliament this time for the district of Segovia. In 1936 he was close to finding his death at the hands of Falangists while he was resting in Cádiz and after the pronunciamiento of July 18, 1936.

== Bibliography ==
- Barba Prieto, Donato (2001). La oposición durante el franquismo/1. La Democracia Cristiana. Madrid: Ediciones Encuentro. p. 307. ISBN 978-8474906196.
- Malagón Barceló, Javier (1969). "In Memoriam: Manuel Giménez Fernández*". The Americas. 26 (1): 77–86. doi:10.1017/S0003161500081207. ISSN 0003-1615.
- Javier Tusell, La España de Franco, 1989, Historia 16 ISBN 84-7679-124-0, pg.250
