= Manuel Senante =

Spanish editor and politician

Manuel Senante Martínez
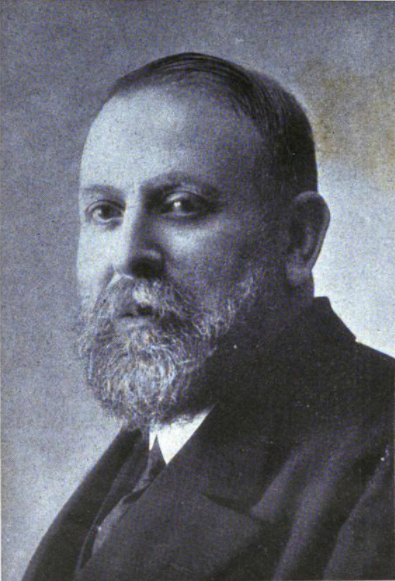
- Born: Manuel Senante Martínez; 1873; Alicante, Spain
- Died: 1959 (aged 85–86); Madrid, Spain
- Occupations: lawyer, politician, media manager
- Known for: Editor
- Political party: Partido Liberal-Conservador, Partido Católico Nacional, Comunión Tradicionalista-Integrista, Comunión Tradicionalista

Manuel Senante Martínez (1873–1959) was a Spanish Traditionalist politician and publisher, until 1931 adhering to the Integrist current and afterwards active in the Carlist ranks. He is known mostly as the longtime editor-in-chief of the Madrid daily El Siglo Futuro (1907–1936). During 8 consecutive terms he served as the Integrist deputy to the Cortes (1907–1923).

== Family and youth ==
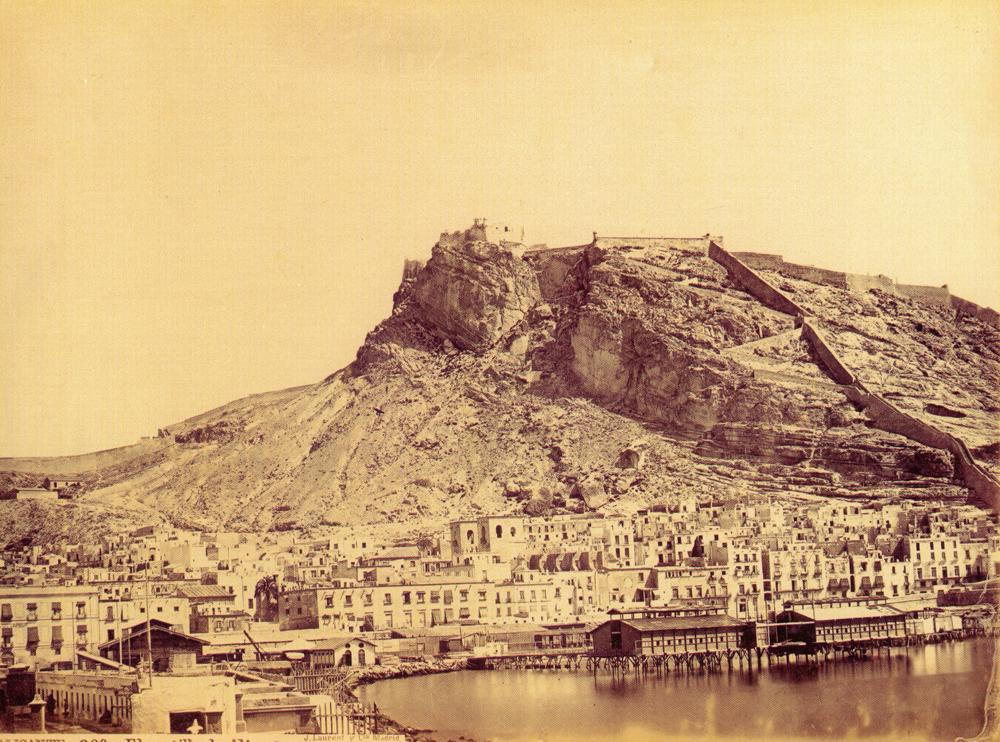
Alicante, 1870s

Manuel was born to a distinguished Alicantine family. His paternal grandfather, Manuel Senante Sala, was professor of Retórica y Poética at Instituto de Segunda Enseñanza of Alicante and its longtime director (1854–1889). His father, Emilio Senante Llaudes (died 1916), was in 1881–1909 teaching geography and history at the very same institute, in 1891–1904 also serving as its director. In 1907 he assumed directorship of the local Escuela Normal de Maestros. Senante Llaudes wrote a number of textbooks in history, fairly popular in secondary education across Levante. Apart from his educative posts, he was also active as a lawyer, periodista and local politician. His brother Francisco Senante Llaudes was a locally recognized composer and maestro.

At unspecified time Senante Llaudes married a girl from Alicante, María Teresa Martínez Torrejón (died 1885). Her brother Antonio Martínez Torrejón would later become a locally known personality, deputy-mayor, poet and publisher, director of the local daily El eco de la provincia. The couple had at least 3 children, Manuel born as the oldest one. His younger brother José died in infancy; another one, Joaquin, perished at 16 years of age.

The young Manuel was brought up in a fervently Catholic ambience; in the 1890s he studied law in Barcelona and Madrid. By the turn of the century, he returned to Alicante, launching his own career as a lawyer in 1897. Representing his clients in cases ranging from private to commercial law, he gradually grew to prominence and got engaged in politically sensitive cases, like a dispute over a forcibly closed local parish cemetery, speaking for the Alicantine San Nicolás community before the Supreme Court; in 1903 he was already one of the Alicante municipal judges. Manuel Senante married Josefa Esplá Rizo (1870–1957), daughter of the Alicantine merchant marine captain and also a local Alicantine municipal counselor. The couple had 6 daughters (3 of them became nuns) and a son, Manuel Senante Esplá, also a Carlist activist. A lawyer, in the 1930s he defended in court individuals charged with engagement in Sanjurjada. He followed in the footsteps of his father and entered the publishing business, serving as member of the board of El Siglo Futuro in the 1930s; during early Francoism he served as municipal judge in Madrid. Senante's daughter Immaculada married Francisco Urries, catedrático of philosophy in Madrid. The family initially lived at the estate of Santa Rosa in San Juan, now a bedroom suburb of Alicante; in the early 20th century it moved permanently to Madrid.

== Early career ==
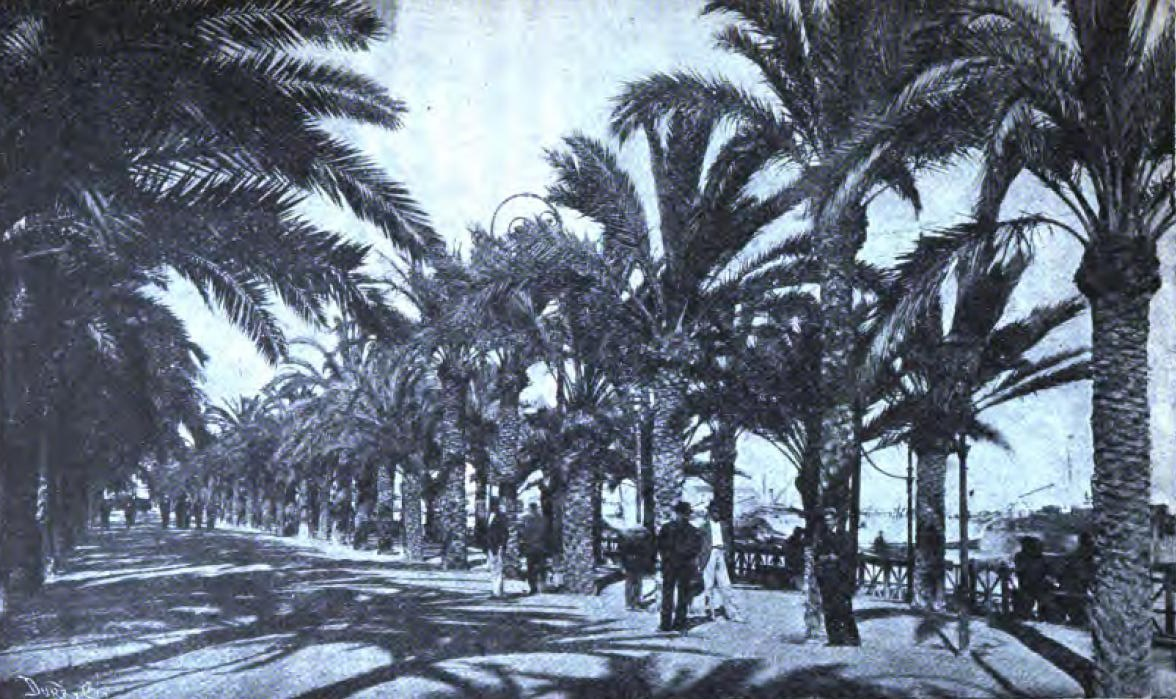
Alicante, 1908

Senante inherited ultraconservative political outlook from his ancestors. His grandfather was a subscriber of the Carlist daily El Siglo Futuro in the 1870s and in the 1880s, when the newspaper followed the breakaway Integrist path; also his father engaged in politically loaded public disputes. Having completed academic period and driven principally by his profound religiosity, back in his home city Manuel threw himself into Alicantine public activities. He associated with the Conservative Party in 1897 and commenced his long editorial career first by contributing and later by running a local party Andalusian daily, La Monarquía (1899–1900). He became active in numerous local Catholic initiatives, e.g. hosting Junta Organizadora for erection of the Century Cross in Alicante in 1901. Senante started to contribute to El Siglo Futuro himself in 1901, initially with short informative pieces. Already in 1902 he was hailed as “elocuentísimo abogado” and “uno de los católicos más firmes y decididos”.

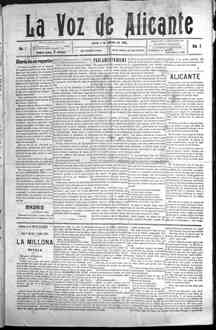
La Voz de Alicante

In the early 20th century Senante dissociated himself from the conservatives and approached Partido Católico Nacional, the Integrist political party; in 1903 he was already reported by the press as “joven abogado alicantino, integrista ayer”. The same year he tried his luck in elections to the Cortes, especially that according to some sources he was already one of the most influential personalities of the Right in the province. He stood as a candidate of Liga Católica, a newly formed electoral platform promoted by the Church in Spain. He fielded his candidature in the south-Levantine city of Orihuela, but was defeated by the famous liberal politician, Francisco Ballesteros.

No source consulted mentions Senante as running in the 1905 elections. He engaged in setting up La Voz de Alicante, the daily which first appeared in 1904 and which he managed as a director. The newspaper was formatted as a broad Catholic tribune, though its Integrist sympathies were evident. Senante was also active in local party structures; his formal position remains unclear, but in 1906 he was already representing the provincial Integrist junta. Apart from pure politics he joined a new initiative, Acción Católica, later presiding over Círculo Obrero of this organization. Displaying some penchant for social issues Senante became member of Instituto de Reformas Sociales, promoted also by the conservative groupings into Instituto Nacional de Previsión; within this structure he entered Consejo de Patronato and represented it within employers’ associations.

== Deputy ==
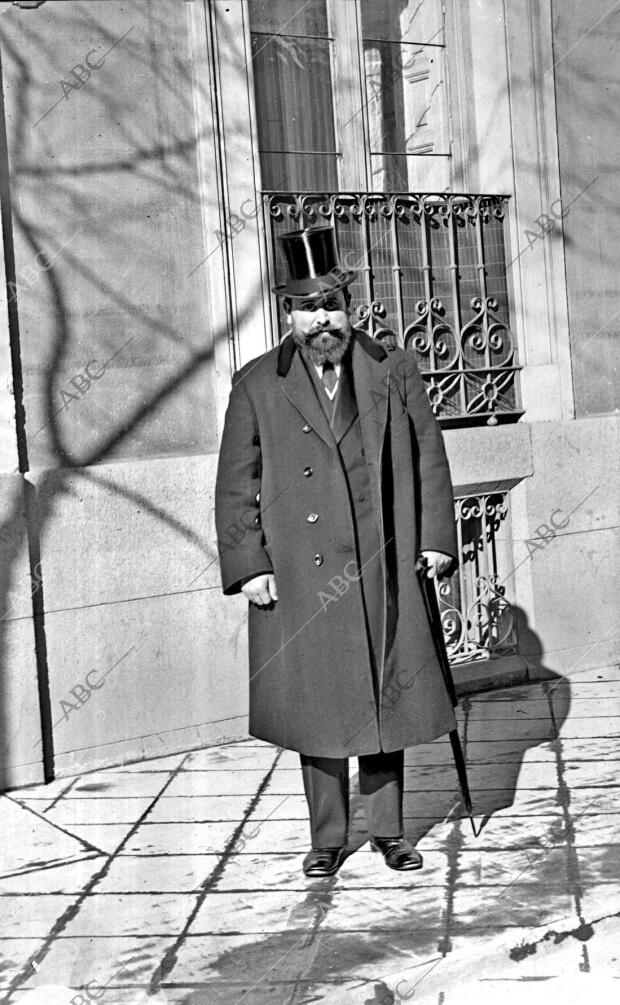
Senante as deputy, 1912

Due to a chain of events following the death of Ramón Nocedal, in the 1907 electoral campaign Senante ran as Integrist candidate in Gipuzkoa; though total alien to Basque political milieu he got safely elected, as Azpeitia, a profoundly religious, conservative rural district, had been usually electing Traditionalist candidates. The 1907 triumph turned out to be the start of a fairly long parliamentary career, lasting for the next 16 years. Senante stood as an Integrist candidate from the same Azpeitia district in course of the following 7 election campaigns of 1910, 1914, 1916, 1918, 1919, 1920 and 1923, always emerging victorious. The mainstream Carlists usually refrained from fielding counter-candidates, though at times other parties presented their contenders; twice (in 1918 and 1920) Senante was declared triumphant having faced no competition and elected according to the notorious Article 29. During 3 terms until 1916 he was one of two Integrist MPs in the Cortes; during 5 terms after that date Senante was the sole party deputy in the parliament.

As representative of Integrism Senante was perhaps the most Right-wing, reactionary and anti-democratic deputy of the entire Cortes; even other ultraconservative MPs, the mainstream Carlists, were to a small extent prepared to demonstrate some flexibility. Senante governed his actions by the principle of defending the sacrosanct Catholic religion, which marked the most visible thread of his activity: defending rights and privileges of the Church against secularization, usually promoted by the Liberals. He sided with the hierarchy both in case of nationwide disasters like Semana Trágica, the event he interpreted mostly in religious terms, and minor though publicity-gaining controversies, like a dispute over possible sale abroad of an antique Zamora pyxis, possessed by the Church.

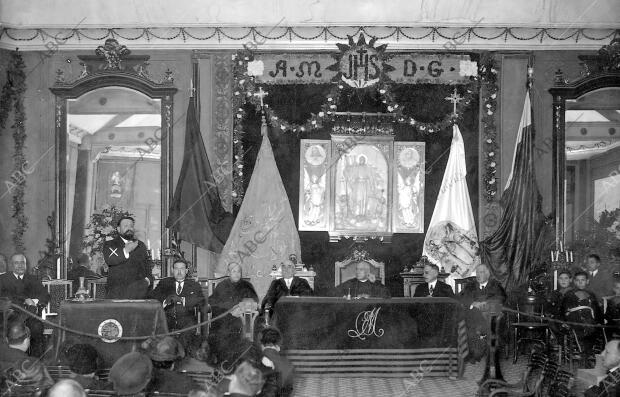
Senante speaking, 1922

Having developed adopted Vascongadas allegiances, Senante was active in the extra-parliamentary commission on regional autonomy organized in 1918 and publishing related works. In general, he tended to vote with the Conservative Party against the Liberals, though at the later stages, especially after the assassination of José Canalejas, he even sided with the Liberals against the growing anarchist and socialist tide. At times he represented Integrism in broad Catholic electoral alliances, formed under the auspices of the primate. By his liberal opponents he was described as an excessively passionate speaker but "a good man inside". Though he represented a competitive Integrist current of Traditionalism, in the early 1920s Senante worked to secure financial status of the Carlist prince Alfonso Carlos, who struggled against the Republican Austrian property regulations.

== El Siglo Futuro ==
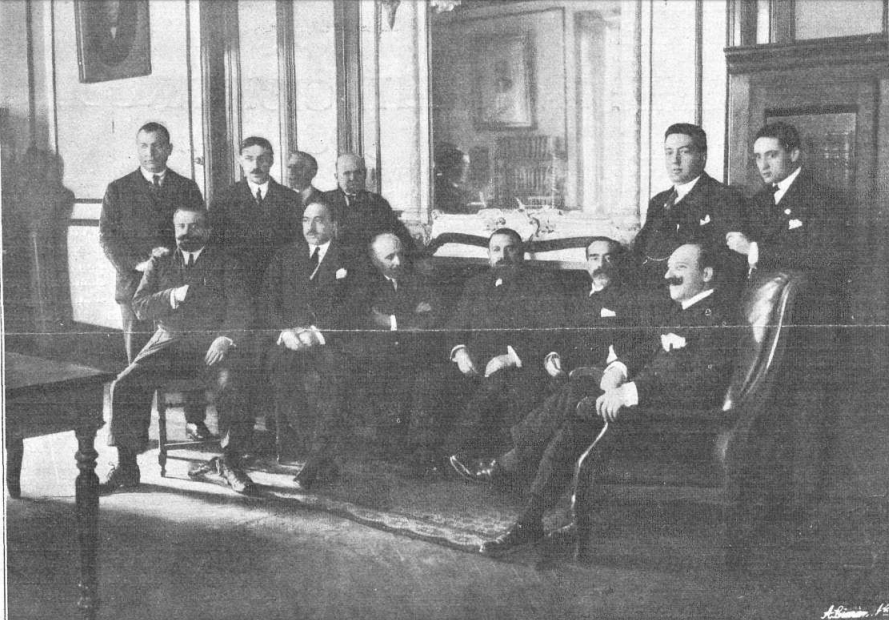
Senante and El Siglo Futuro staff

By the early 20th century Senante already had some experience as an editor, managing La Monarquia and especially La Voz de Alicante. He kept steering the Alicantine daily when the death of Ramón Nocedal vacated the chairmanship of El Siglo Futuro. The daily, set up in 1875 by Candidó Nocedal, remained a second-rate newspaper in terms of circulation and impact on the Spanish national market, but for ultraconservative politics it emerged as an iconic voice and a point of reference. Following an eight-month vacancy, in November 1907 it was Senante who appointed the new director.

El Siglo Futuro remained under Senante's leadership for the next 29 years and was probably his lifetime achievement. For three decades Senante was its strategic director, editor and manager, setting the political line rather than contributing himself. Madrid-based, the daily was better positioned to trace national politics and influence decision makers than mainstream Carlist dailies, especially the Barcelona-based El Correo Catalán, the Sevilla-based La Unión and the Pamplona-based El Pensamiento Navarro. Its readership base remained stable, composed mostly of lower parish clergy and Traditionalist activists. Though under Senante the paper underwent modernization with the introduction of graphics and expansion into economic, culture and sport sections, over time – especially in the 1920s and later – the circulation distance between El Siglo Futuro and leading national newspapers broadened into an abyss.

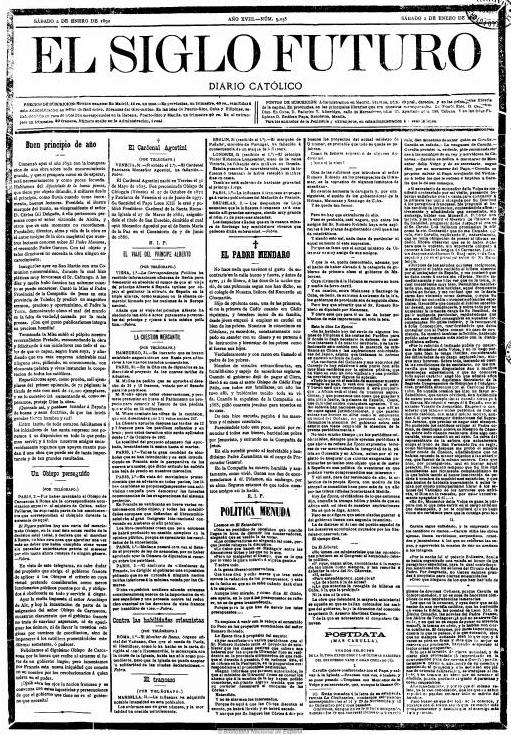
El Siglo Futuro

In terms of ideological outlook Senante followed the Nocedals closely; El Siglo Futuro remained an ultraconservative, vehemently anti-liberal and then anti-democratic vehicle of pursuing traditional values centered on the Catholic faith. Its principal objective was defense of religion and position of the Church; its primary foe was liberalism, later to be paired with democracy and socialism. In terms of party politics the paper remained the tribune of Integrism and was perhaps its most visible emanation in the Spanish public realm; even following amalgamation within Carlism in the early 1930s El Siglo Futuro cherished its Integrist identity. In terms of its style and language El Siglo Futuro was a fairly typical Spanish party paper, excelling in bombastic, hyperbolic, inflammatory, intransigent, sectarian phraseology. The paper led a venomous campaign against the Jews and freemasonry, though it did not advocate any specific measures. The official Spanish digital archive describes the late daily as fanatically fundamentalist, consumed by apocalyptic obsession and dubbed “a caveman”.

== Dictatorship ==
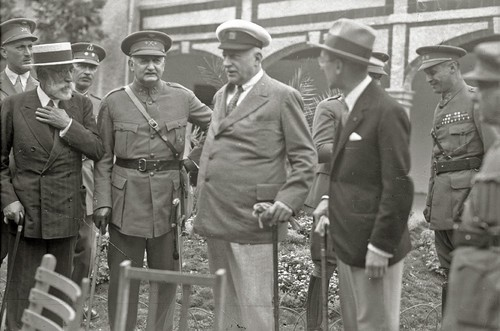
Prime minister Primo de Rivera

Senante welcomed the fall of liberal democracy, deemed rotten with political corruption and unable to solve any of the problems facing the country. El Siglo Futuro greeted the coup as “el movimiento militar de Primo de Rivera, encaminado a la defensa de la realeza y del pueblo contra esta aristocracia caciquil del parlamentarismo”, which accomplished a long overdue task and generated “entusiasmo que el hecho histórico realizado por el Ejército despierta en España”. It was only gradually that the Integrists, their party dissolved, were getting disillusioned with inertia and lack of decisive change, demonstrated by the dictator. In 1926, prior to the plebiscite intended as endorsement of a future national assembly, El Siglo Futuro declared itself supportive of Primo de Rivera but firmly voiced against Unión Patriótica and its program, calling its readers to abstain from voting. Senante himself, though deprived of official means of political action, was appointed by the three Basque provinces as their informal representative in Madrid; nothing is known about his related activities.

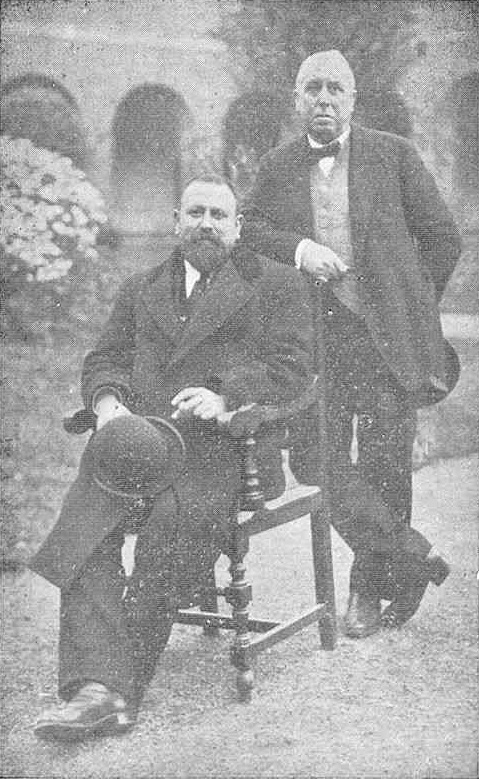
Senante in mid-1920s

The dictatorship years witnessed major transformation of Spanish Catholicism. Senante opposed new Christian-democratic format of mobilization already in the previous decade, first confronting Luis Coloma but later targeting Grupo de la Democracia Cristiana and Maximiliano Arboleya. The conflict took an increasingly bitter turn in the late 1920s. Senante, who viewed social conflict as part of the religious question, despised democratic platform of policy making, its malmenorismo and accidentalism; in return, Arboleya dubbed Integrism “a Catholic freemasonry”. Though primate Segura called both parties to cease public polemics, the conflict spilled over to the early 1930s. Senante's relations with Herrera Oria remained correct, though apart from political differences, it was plagued by rivalry of two publishers. He entered Acción Católica executive in the early 1930s; his firm monarchical stance was increasingly incompatible with accidentalist position taken by Herrera.

El Siglo Futuro had no regrets about Primo's fall, concluding melancholically that the dictator did not live up to the vote of confidence he had received from the nation. During the liberalization produced by Dictablanda, the Spanish Integrism re-emerged as a new political party, Comunión Tradicionalista-Integrista; Senante became deputy head of the entire organization and signed a joint monarchist manifesto of 1930, published to defend Religion, Fatherland and Monarchy against the looming Republican threat.

== Republic ==
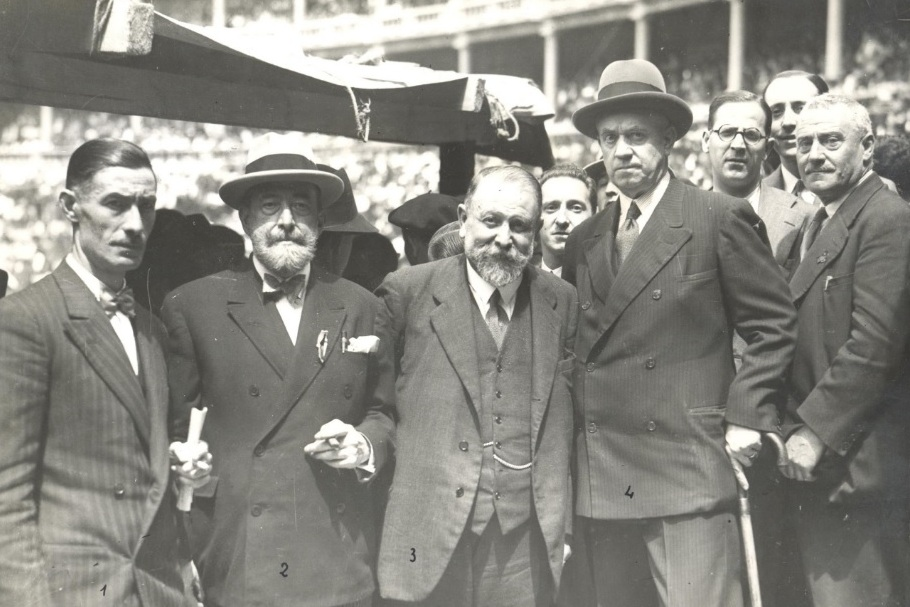
among Carlist politicians, 1931

Senante welcomed the Republic with hardly veiled antipathy, which following quema de conventos turned into horror and enmity. Viewing anti-religious violence in apocalyptic terms, he advised intransigence to cardinal Segura, which in turn cost the primate expulsion from republican Spain. As the two had already developed close relationship, Senante engaged actively in a campaign defending the exiled primate. By the end of 1931 he clashed with the papal nuncio Tedeschini, accusing him of inaction and conspiring to get the envoy recalled to Vatican; the events forged an even closer friendship between Senante and Segura. In 1932 he publicly presented the doctrine of disobedience to the Republic, publishing his Cuestiones candentes de adhesión and growing into a key theorist of violent resistance against the Republic.

Since late 1920 Senante and the Integrists approached the Jaimistas, and already in the spring of 1931 he publicly spoke in favor or a reunification; later that year he joined a group of mainstream Carlists representing Don Jaime in dynastical negotiations with the deposed Alfonso XIII. He demonstrated no hesitation when forming the united Carlist organization, Comunión Tradicionalista. In 1932 Senante entered Junta Suprema Tradicionalista, executive of the new party, representing Levante and Andalusia. He also joined managing board of Editorial Tradicionalista, a company taking ownership of El Siglo Futuro, and together with fellow ex-integrist Lamamié dominated within the body, triggering grumblings about Integrist domination in the party. The board was reconstituted by Tomás Domínguez Arévalo by the end of 1933, though El Siglo Futuro retained a dose of independence until 1935.

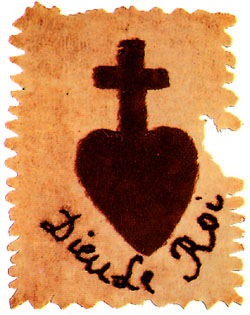
religious propaganda

In terms of electoral tactics Senante made a U-turn. Initially he favored an alliance with the Alfonsinos and became a leading figure in Acción Nacional; once the coalition assumed an accidentalist tone and got infected by Christian-democratic style he turned firmly against it, growing into one of the most outspoken Carlist opponents of collaboration within either TYRE or later Bloque Nacional. He was also increasingly disappointed by nationalist turn of the Basque campaign; despite his Restauración and dictatorship defense of Vascongadas fueros, Senante viewed the autonomous campaign with suspicion. He tried to resume parliamentarian career not in Gipuzkoa but in his native Alicante; outmaneuvered during coalition talks he ran as independent and was defeated both in 1933 and 1936.

In 1934 Senante successfully launched the candidature of ex-fellow Integrist Manuel Fal Conde as a party leader; despite the age difference the two developed lasting cordial relationship. The same year, together with party pundits like Jesús Comín, he entered Consejo de Cultura de la Comunión, a body within the movement entrusted with diffusion of the ideology; in 1935, when Fal was officially appointed Jefe Delegado, Senante entered his auxiliary governing body, Council of the Communion. Early 1936 he co-drafted a document issued later by Don Alfonso Carlos, in case of his death appointing Don Javier as the Carlist regent.

== War and Francoism ==
Carlist standard

It is not clear to what extent Senante participated in the Carlist plot against the Republic. During the July 1936 coup he was in Valencia, where the rebels failed. He avoided almost certain incarceration by seeking refuge in a foreign diplomatic mission and eventually made it to the Nationalist zone in the summer of 1937, installing himself first at the Olazábals’ estate in San Sebastián, later in 1938 moving to Vitoria. When trapped in the Republican zone Senante was unable to participate in internal Carlist disputes related to amalgamation into FET, but afterwards, when nominated member of Junta Nacional Carlista de Guerra, he adopted a hostile stand. Though he considered re-launching El Siglo Futuro, he eventually abandoned the idea, unwilling to see his opus magnum integrated into the Francoist propaganda machine.

In 1941 he could have been involved in a plot against Franco, which left him injured in a related car accident. In 1942 he refused advances of the Juanistas and preferred to enter Junta Auxiliar, a body loyal to the Carlist regent-claimant Don Javier; the same year he signed a statement condemning the regime described as “intruso y usurpador”. This declaration was followed in 1943 by a letter delivered to Franco by general Vigón and demanding restoration of monarchy, forming of a regency, suppression of partido unico and restoration of civic rights; one scholar describes Senante of that day as “feroce integrista”. Early 1944 he spoke against the pro-Axis leaning of the Spanish foreign policy and later that year, during a clandestine 1944 monarchist meeting in Seville, he voted in favor of an attempt to overthrow Franco. In 1947 he took part in the first nationwide meeting of the Carlist executive since 1937, supporting intransigent course adopted by Fal and re-establishment of a new Concejo Nacional.

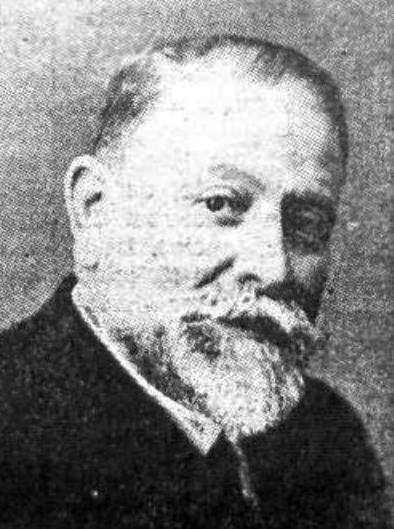
Senante in his 60s

None of the sources consulted provides any information on Senante's public activities after 1947; it seems that due to his age he started to withdraw from politics, still loyal to Don Javier as the Carlist regent and to Manuel Fal as the Carlist political leader. As late as in the mid-1950s in a letter to Franco he confirmed that "we, the Traditionalists" could never integrate in FET, the party founded on principles which remain unacceptable to the Communion. He remained on friendly terms with the primate, cardinal Segura, especially as in the 1940s Carlism enjoyed probably best-ever relations with the Spanish Catholic hierarchy, since the 1830s at best lukewarm towards the movement. Member of a number of religious associations, Senante was also lawyer of the Roman Rota, though his personal relations with Vatican suffered due to mutual antagonism with cardinal Tedeschini. In 1959, two weeks before death, he was applauded by the Francoist press as a nestor of Spanish journalism when awarded the hijo predilecto title by the city of Alicante.

== See also ==
- Carlism
- Integrism (Spain)
- El Siglo Futuro
- Juan Olazábal Ramery
