= Cárcel del Saladero =

Coordinates: 40.4273°N 3.6964°W

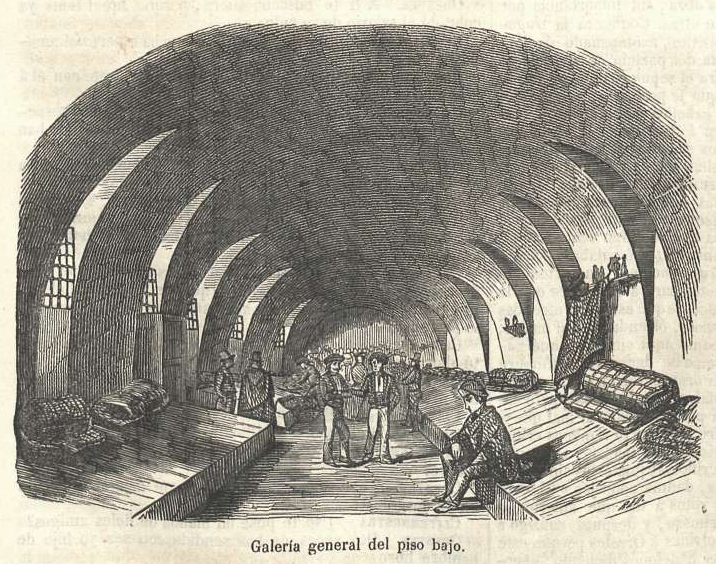

The Cárcel del Saladero (English: The Saladero Prison) also known as Cárcel de Villa, was a prison in the Spanish city of Madrid, operational during the 19th century. The name of the prison arose from its original use for bacon salting (saladero de tocino).
