= Catholic Church and politics =

Interplay of Catholicism with religious, and later secular, politics

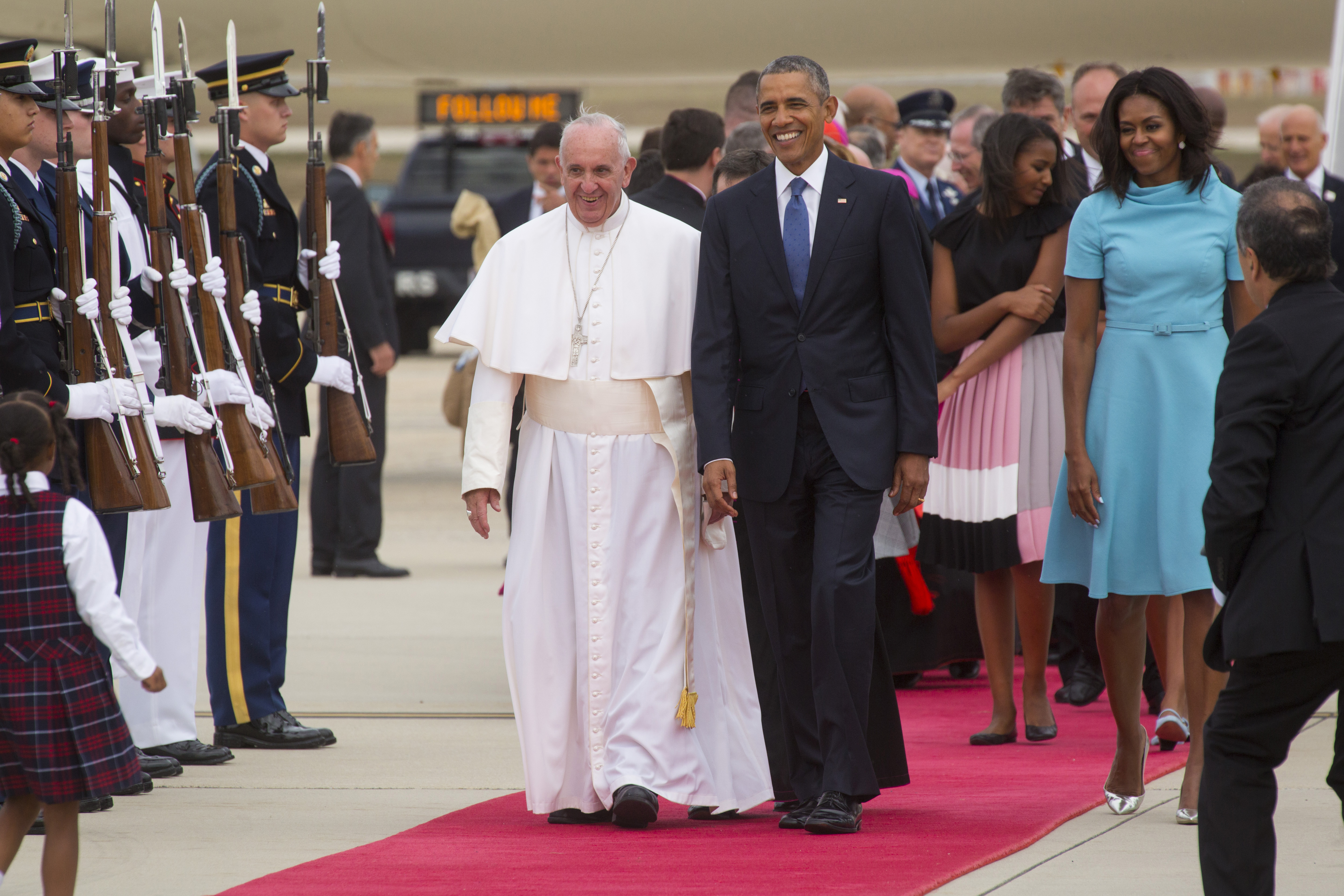
Pope Francis with the then-US president Barack Obama in 2015

The Catholic Church and politics concerns the interplay of Catholicism with religious, and later secular, politics.

The Catholic Church's views and teachings have evolved over its history and have at times been significant political influences within nations.

== Overview ==
Historically, the Church followed the policy of strict neutrality, with Catholic thinkers such as Eusebius of Caesarea believing that the Church should not concern itself with political matters. However, Saint Augustine, one of the Doctors of the Church, influenced the Church with his theory of minimal involvement in politics, according to which the Church "accepted the legitimacy of even pagan governments that maintained a social order useful to Christians as well, and to the extent that the freedom of the Church to carry out its evangelical task was allowed." In the 13th century, Thomas Aquinas discussed the concept of political legitimacy and the moral issues of using political power, concluding that explicit limitations to governmental power are necessary. Later Thomists such as Saint Cajetan, Francisco Suárez and Robert Bellarmine introduced the idea of early Christian democracy, according to which political power was granted by God to each community, and every political official was to obey the community's determination in his political decisions; according to this concept, the community could transfer the authority from one official to another as well.

In the early Church, the biblical passage Matthew 22:21 ("Render to Caesar, the things that are Caesar's, and to God, the things that are God's") was a source of discussion regarding the role of the Church and its relations with secular governments, defining the dualism of Catholic political thinking; unlike earlier religions, the Catholic Church became a separate, independent institution that was not a part of any ethnic or political structures of already existing communities. The Church's doctrine considered Christian communities to be the "recipients of divine grace and inspiration", along with the clergy. Paul E. Sigmund argues that democratic thinking was already present in the early Church, as early Catholics "acted as communities to make decisions about common affairs, becoming almost independent self-governing entities in periods of persecution".

The High Middle Ages was the heyday of monarchism. In the Church, this meant the rise of papal authority under popes such as Gregory VIII and Innocent III, who exerted wide influence over the Christian states of Europe and claimed supremacy over all of Europe's kings, engaging in major political battles such as the Investiture Controversy. However, medieval Catholic thinkers also pioneered ideas of democracy: John of Salisbury spoke of a conceptual democracy based on the ideals of Christian corporatism, comparing the organisation of society to the structure of the human body, with each social class having its role in the society and democratic right to participate in politics. The Church's tradition taught that government and laws originally emerged from the people, and were justified with their consent (consensus). Catholic thinkers believed that government authority was to be limited by natural and customary laws, as well as independent institutions such as the Church. Even papal authority should be balanced by the secular nobility (episcopalism) and the Church hierarchy (election of the Pope by the conclave, and the conciliar movement). According to Walter Ullmann, medieval Catholic scholars came close to envisioning and endorsing democracy in its modern form, with Saint Thomas writing that the law should be formulated by "the whole community or the person who represents it" and describing a regime in which "all participate in the election of those who rule" as the best form of governance, formulating the concept of universal suffrage. He also recognised limits to papal authority, writing that the pope can only intervene in affairs "in which the temporal power is subject to him".

In the modern era, which saw the rise of electoral democracy and secularism, the Church strongly rejected and clashed with regimes of anti-clerical and anti-Catholic nature. This included Revolutionary France, where the Church was the target of harsh persecution; hundreds of Catholic priests were murdered in the September Massacres, and the Reign of Terror that followed partly targeted the Church as well. Although the Church's resistance to French, German and Italian regimes is seen as an example of the Church's opposition to democracy, Bradley Lewis argues that these regimes were not democratic at all, and Carolyn M. Warner states that the Church "adapted to democratic context" and supported democracy as long as it respected clerical interests.

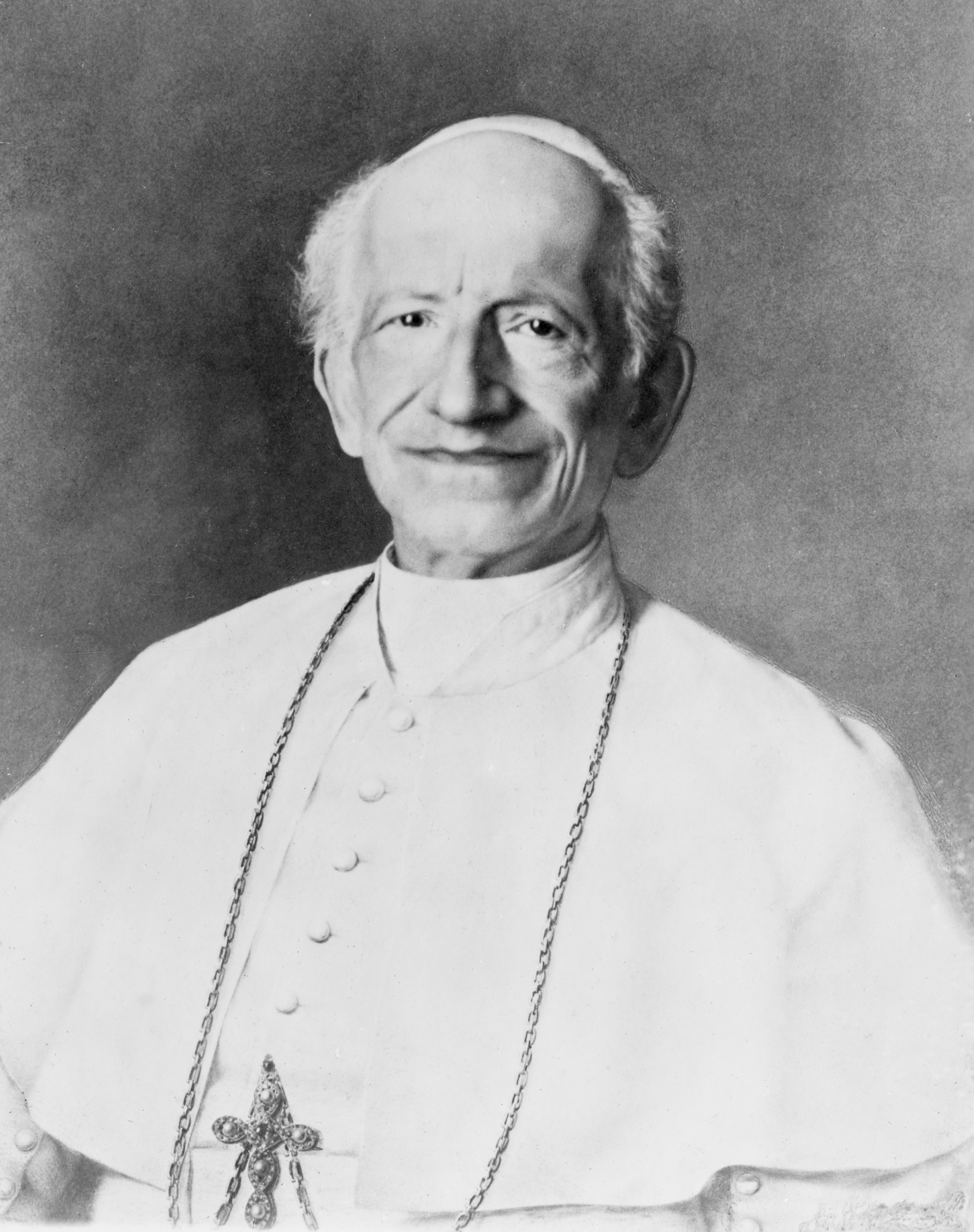
Pope Leo XIII

Despite its struggle against democratic and liberal anti-clericalism, the Church's commitment to a communitarian and Christian type of democracy was officially established by Pope Leo XIII in his encyclicals Au milieu des sollicitudes and Graves de communi re. There, Pope Leo XIII endorsed democracy as the most Catholic type of governance, but warned that a Catholic democracy must "benefit the lower classes of society", work for the common good and reject individualism in favor of communitarianism, thus reaffirming the Church's rejection of "individualistic liberal" capitalism. These declarations laid the foundation of Catholic social teaching, which rejected both capitalism and communism. In terms of political development, Catholic social teaching endorsed democracy on the condition that it constitutes a protection of human dignity and the moral law, and valued common good over individualism.

Prior to World War II, numerous Catholic thinkers advanced the idea of a Catholic political regime; Jacques Maritain argued that democracy was a "fruit of the Gospel itself and its unfolding in history", writing that political Catholicism in its essence promotes democracy based on "justice, charity, and the realization of a fraternal community". More conservative Catholic thinkers such as Yves Simon also fully endorsed democracy, but saw it as a way to prevent the exploitation of the poor and abuse of the Church by the ruling class; in that sense, the conservative Catholic view of democracy was one that supported democracy as an "institutionalization of the people's right of resistance against tyranny". The concept of Catholic democracy was further established by Pope Pius XII in his 1944 Christmas Message, in which he stressed that a "true democracy" must see the people as a "body of citizens" rather than "simply a mass", as the former will make the citizens aware of their fellow rights and duties, while the latter is "an undifferentiated multitude open to manipulation by demagogues". He also affirmed the need for an "authentic democracy" to follow communitarian and Catholic values:

Authentic democracy is possible only in a State ruled by law, and on the basis of a correct conception of the human person. It requires that the necessary conditions be present for the advancement both of the individual through education and formation in true ideals, and of the “subjectivity” of society through the creation of structures of participation and shared responsibility. Nowadays there is a tendency to claim that agnosticism and skeptical relativism are the philosophy and the basic attitude which correspond to democratic forms of political life. Those who are convinced that they know the truth and firmly adhere to it are considered unreliable from a democratic point of view, since they do not accept that truth is determined by the majority, or that it is subject to variation according to different political trends. It must be observed in this regard that if there is no ultimate truth to guide and direct political activity, then ideas and convictions can easily be manipulated for reasons of power. As history demonstrates, a democracy without values easily turns into open or thinly disguised totalitarianism.

In the 1960s, the Second Vatican Council and Pope Paul VI endorsed the notion that the Church must fight not only for democracy itself but also for human rights, and it was concluded that participation in public affairs, to the degree that the country's level of development allowed, was a human right; the council also confirmed the Church's duty to promote democracy as a system that best ensured the protection of the common good. According to the teachings of Pope John Paul II, any political regime must be measured by its ability to protect human dignity, which is "rooted in man’s living in both freedom and truth". Pope John Paul II describes democracy as having three dimensions:

- the participation of citizens in political decision-making;
- elections and the consequent accountability to the voters of political officials;
- and the notion that democracy is more likely to pursue the common good as distinct from the good of the rulers only.

However, John Paul II also highlighted that a democracy cannot be individualist, as a free civil society is one that provides "a widespread opportunity for participation in the goods only available to persons through cooperation". John Paul II also stressed the need for subsidiarity and the need for local self-government that would preserve regional cultures, and remarked that a "high degree of moral achievement" and adherence to Catholic virtues as well as "courage, moderation, justice, and prudence" are needed for democracy to succeed. Pope Benedict XVI defined democracy as protector of human dignity, and stressed that abandoning "moral reasoning" in favor of purely technical reasoning promoted by total understanding of "modern science and technology" can lead to a "dictatorship of relativism", which would lack universal moral values. Benedict XVI warned that "without a consciousness of the moral law, democracy cannot be sustained and degenerates into the dictatorship of relativism or what Tocqueville famously called the "tyranny of the majority".

== 19th century ==
As a program and a movement, political Catholicism – a political and cultural conception which promotes the ideas and social teaching of the Catholic Church in public life through government action – was started by Prussian Catholics in the second half of the 19th century.

=== Germany ===
German Catholics opposed the German Unification, as they wished to preserve the independence of German nations as well as the old German Confederation, which guaranteed Catholics religious freedom. When Catholic activists requested North German parliament to enact similar protections, "Protestant liberals in the North German parliament vetoed this request and pointed to it as an act of Catholic disloyalty". Under the Kulturkampf policy, Otto von Bismarck "associated the meaning of being German with Protestantism". Germany was proclaimed as a "distinctively Protestant empire". Catholic minorities such as Poles and the French were persecuted, and "German Catholics were imagined as Germany's internal foreigners and increasingly marginalized from German society and politics as enemies of the new Reich". German authorities considered German Catholics foreign and saw them as a threat to creation of a homogenous German identity. Kulturkampf aimed to eliminate Catholicism from the cultural and public sphere completely – Catholic seminaries and schools were closed, church property was confiscated, and thousands of Catholic clergy were arrested or exiled. According to a German historian Herbert Lepper, the Kulturkampf was a "war of annihilation waged by the Prussian state against the Catholic Church as a spiritual-religious and political power".

According to Hajo Holborn, German liberals were ready to give up their liberal principles and support Kulturkampf out of anti-Catholic sentiment. Holborn notes that the measures against the Catholic Church "constituted shocking violations of liberal principles" and that "German liberalism showed no loyalty to the ideas of lawful procedure or of political and cultural freedom which had formerly been its lifeblood". Gordon A. Craig points out that German liberals were not coerced by the Prussian state into supporting the Kulturkampf legislation in any way, but willingly backed it despite the fact that it betrayed their principles and included provisions that enabled ethnic cleansing in Poland. Polish Catholics were forcibly removed from their houses, which were then given to the Prussian Settlement Commission. The Kulturkampf laws had a double purpose: they were directed against German Catholics, who were considered opponents of a unified German state and harboured pro-French sympathies, and against Poles, against whom the German state was conducting an ethnic cleansing campaign. Bismarck accused the Catholic Church of harbouring "Polish tendencies" and of actively "polonizing" German Catholics; Bismarck also saw the Church as a major obstacle to his Germanisation policies against Poles in Germany. Both the Catholic clergy and German Catholics were accused of aiding the Polish national movement, with Bismarck contending that Catholics in Germany "were actively supporting Polish candidates to the Reichstag". West Prussian officials would describe a "suspiciously agitated mood" amongst German Catholics, and a Danzig report from 1871 claimed that the Polish and German Catholic population "persists in its cool, suspicious attitude; even now hopes for the success of French arms are audible from these circles". The Kulturkampf did unite German Catholics and Poles as both were harshly affected by the anti-Catholic policies, and Catholics of Germany were supportive of the Polish national movement. As to counteract this, German settlers to Polish territories were exclusively Protestant, as the Prussian authorities believed that "the true German is a Protestant".

In reaction to the Kulturkampf legislation, Catholic distrust of the German state grew and German Catholics retreated into confessionally separate milieus – social organisations, devotional associations, the Catholic press and the political Catholicism of the Centre Party. These institutions became main vehicles of Catholic difference by promoting common Catholic values and worldviews. This led German Catholics to isolate themselves from German nationalism – German Catholics were opposed to a unified German state, and overwhelmingly rejected National Socialism. According to Jürgen W. Falter, 83% of recruits to the NSDAP were Protestant, while the Nazi Party failed to make any inroads among Catholics. Richard Steigmann-Gall observed that electorally, Catholic areas "saw near total opposition to the Nazis" and concluded that "Nazi party's share of a region's vote was inversely proportional to the Catholic percentage of its population".

=== Austria ===
From Germany, political Catholic social movements spread in Austria-Hungary, especially in today's Austria, Ukraine, Slovenia and Croatia. Catholic Action was the name of many groups of lay Catholics attempting to encourage Catholic influence on political society. Many Catholic movements were born in 19th-century Austria, such as the Progressive Catholic movement promoted by thinkers such as Wilfried Daim and Ernst Karl Winter. Once strongly opposed by the Church because of its anti-clerical tendencies, liberalism started to be reapproached by Catholics, giving birth to a Catholic liberal movement in Austria. As Austria was an overwhelmingly agrarian country until the 1930s, the Catholic social movement was mostly represented by agrarian leagues as well as rural trade unions. Catholic leaders had their roots in farming and artisan environments, and the social thought promoted by political Catholicism was communitarian and distributist, reflecting "the social model of the village". Anton Burghardt observes that Social Catholicism in Austria "was never friendly to capitalism; on the contrary, there was always a strong aversion to industrial capitalism in the Catholic camp". This allowed left-wing Catholic organisations to enter dialogue with socialist and social-democrat activists.

=== Spain ===
Political changes in Spain during the second half of the nineteenth century led to the development of Catholic Integrism and Carlism struggling against a separation of Church and State. The clearest expression of this struggle arose around the 1884 publication of the book Liberalism is a Sin by Roman Catholic priest Félix Sardà y Salvany. The book was rapidly referred to Rome, where it received a positive, albeit cautious welcome.

=== Italy ===
The Church opposed the Unification of Italy, put in motion by anti-clerical nationalism and resulting in the abolition of the Papal States. Italian Catholics were divorced from Italian nationalism as well as the government itself because of its anti-clericalism. In late 19th century, Social Catholicism based on Catholic social teaching became a prevalent force amongst Italian Catholics, who started to organize themselves into labor federations and labour unions, promoting Catholic socialism as an alternative to the nationalist, anti-clerical socialism. These political developments led to the creation of Italian People's Party as well as the Confederazione Italiana dei Lavoratori, a Catholic socialist confederation of trade unions. Catholic trade union membership was particularly high among rural workers, small landowners and sharecroppers, as well as peasants. The Catholic ideal appealed to marginalised and impoverished groups, and proved itself a formidable alternative to socialist unions.

== Rerum novarum ==
Pope Leo XIII's 1891 encyclical Rerum novarum (Of New Things) gave political Catholic movements an impulse to develop and to spread the area of their involvement. With this encyclical, the Catholic Church expanded its interest in social, economic, political and cultural issues, and it called for a drastic conversion of Western society in the 19th century in the face of capitalist influences. Following the release of the document, the labour movement which had previously floundered began to flourish in Europe, and later in North America. Mary Harris Jones ("Mother Jones") and the National Catholic Welfare Council were central in the campaign to end child labour in the United States during the early 20th century.

== Catholic movements in the 20th century ==
In the 20th century, the Catholic Church chose a stance against Capital Punishment and against Nuclear Weapons. Catholic political movements also became very strong in Spain, Italy, Germany, Austria, Ireland, France and Latin America. What these movements had in common was a defense of the acquired rights of the Catholic Church (attacked by anticlerical politicians) and a defense of Christian faith and moral values (threatened by increasing secularization). Opponents called such efforts clericalism.

These Catholic movements developed various forms of Christian democratic ideology, generally promoting socially and morally conservative ideas such as traditional family values and a culture of life while supporting alternatives such as distributism to both unrestrained capitalism and state socialism. Freemasons were seen mainly as enemies and vehement opponents of political Catholicism. In Mexico, the atheist President Plutarco Elías Calles repressed the Church and Catholics, leading to the Cristero War that lasted from 1926 to 1929.

By the 20th century, the Church's writings on democracy were "directly read, read and commented upon" by Christian politicians, inspiring Christian democratic parties and movements in Europe and South America. A visit by Jacques Maritain in Chile provoked a split within the Conservative Party in 1938, with a progressive Catholic faction abandoning the party to found the National Falange. According to Paul E. Sigmund, Catholic social and political thought "became a major source of democratic theory" in Latin America as well as Europe.

Some of the earliest important political parties were:

- Conservative Catholic Party of Switzerland – 1848
- Catholic Party (Belgium) – 1869
- Centre Party (Germany) – with origins in 1870
- Christian Social Party (Austria) – 1893
- Popular Liberal Action in France – 1901
- General League of Roman Catholic Caucuses (Netherlands) – 1904, reorganized as the Roman Catholic State Party in 1926
- Slovak People's Party – 1918
- Czechoslovak People's Party – 1919
- Croatian Popular Party – 1919
- Italian People's Party – 1919
- Polish Christian Democratic Party – 1919
- Bavarian People's Party – 1919
- National League for the Defense of Religious Liberty in Mexico – 1924
- Democratic Labor Party in Australia – 1955

Most of these parties in Europe joined in the White International (1922), in opposition to the Communist International. Franco's mixture of Catholicism and nationalism received its own brand of National Catholicism and it inspired similar movements throughout Europe.

In addition to political parties, Catholic/Christian trade unions were created, which fought for worker's rights: the earliest include:

- Typographic Workers Trade Union in Spain (1897);
- United Federation of Christian Trade Unions in Germany (1901);
- Solidarity in South Africa (1902);
- Confederation of Christian Trade Unions in Belgium (1904);
- Catholic Workers Union in Mexico (1908);
- International Federation of Christian Trade Unions (IFCTO), in The Hague in 1920 (which was preceded by the International Secretariat of Christian Trade Unions founded in Zürich in 1908, led through the World Confederation of Labour (WCL) to today's International Trade Union Confederation (ITUC));
- French Confederation of Christian Workers (1919);
- Lithuanian Labour Federation (1919);
- Luxembourg Confederation of Christian Trade Unions (1921);
- Canadian Catholic Federation of Labour (1921)
- Young Christian Workers in Belgium (1924);
- Catholic Worker Movement in the US (from 1933).

After World War II, more such unions were formed, including:

- Italian Confederation of Workers' Trade Unions (from 1950);
- Christian Trade Union Federation of Germany (from 1959);
- Christian Workers' Union in Belize (from 1963);
- Solidarity in Poland (from 1980).

In the 20th century, and especially after the Second Vatican Council, the church came to be associated with moderately social-democratic and economically left-wing causes; after the encyclicals Rerum novarum of 1891 and Quadragesimo anno of 1931, the church firmly established its Christian democratic outlook which supported "pluralistic democracy, human rights, and a mixed economy". Paul E. Sigmund describes the church's philosophy at that time as one that promoted "free institutions, the welfare state, and political democracy". According to G. Michael McCarthy, anti-Catholicism in the United States had xenophobic and racial but also political overtones as Southern Protestants "strongly opposed the church's liberal policies – particularly its uncompromising position against social and political segregation." According to John Hellman, "Not long before he died, Lenin told a French Catholic visitor that "only Communism and Catholicism offered two diverse, complete and inconfusible conceptions of human life". This led Maurice Thorez of the French Communist Party to offer "an outstretched hand" to French Catholics in 1936, wishing "to achieve a tactical alliance to head off fascism in France and Europe and to promote social progress". A large number of French Catholics did enter a dialogue with the party, but to Thorez's surprise, "these Catholics were not, for the most part, the Catholic workers, clerks, artisans, peasants to whom Maurice Thorez had addressed his appeal, but rather Catholic philosophers, "social priests," journalists, and cardinals". While Catholics were wary of the socialist concept of the revolution, and strongly opposed to the atheism of most socialist movements, "strong criticism of capitalism and economic liberalism was a persistent theme in episcopal pronouncements and Catholic literature". The attempt of a Communist-Catholic unity in France is considered successful, as most French Catholics were opposed to fascism and when offered an alliance on grounds of anti-fascist unity, "saw the Communist offer as a religious and moral rather than political issue".

Similar alliance took place in Italy. According to a historian Elisa Carrillo, the Vatican was sceptical of "condemning any variety of communism", and Italian Catholics cooperated with Communists in the anti-fascist resistance. After WWII, members of the Italian Catholic Action "saw no essential incompatibility between Marxism and Catholicism" and established close ties with Communists such as Mario Alicata and Pietro Ingrao. Catholic Communists in Italy also had contacts with the clergy, such as with the priest Giuseppe De Luca. The church made "no attempt to suppress or condemn the efforts of these young people to reconcile Catholicism with Marxism", and in 1943, Cardinal Luigi Maglione intervened on behalf of 400 Communist Catholics who were arrested for anti-government demonstrations.

Following the council, the Catholic Church became linked to democratization movements in both developed and developing countries, opposing authoritarianism and advocating for human rights. However, this was not universal, and the extent of church involvement in politics varied greatly between countries. The church started actively opposing authoritarian regimes; in Chile, the church was opposed to the Pinochet Regime and helped rescue "thousands of foreigners and leftist activists that were fleeing the country or taking refuge in foreign embassies". The 1974 Bishops Conference in Chile harshly criticized the regime and urged for a return to democracy, and in 1975 the clergy started actively partaking in anti-government demonstrations. The church also opposed the Franco Regime. While the church in Spain was devastated after the Spanish Civil War and signed a concordat with the regime to ensure that it would avoid further persecution, it soon emerged as an opponent of the regime in the 1950s. The growing opposition to the dictatorship forced the regime to start "fining priests for their sermons, jailing members of the clergy, and considering the expulsion of a bishop, thereby risking the excommunication of the government".

Nicola Rooney argues that although Spanish clergy were accused of collaborating with Francoist forces during the Spanish Civil War, "the regime had managed to exile a significant number of its opponents, thereby giving the illusion of unanimous support from the Church." In Francoist Spain, the "members of clergy were to play a leading role in the opposition to the dictatorship". This was particularly true for the Catholic clergy in "Basque Country and Catalonia, where the clergy were actively involved in regional nationalism, and also for those priests from Catholic worker organisations who took up the defence of striking workers". As the opposition from the Catholic Church intensified, the Franco regime soon started acting against the clergy, and a prison for Catholic priests called Concordat Prison was created. Hank Johnston and Jozef Figa also argue that in Spain, "the church was crucial in the nationalist and working-class wings of the anti-Francoist movement"; with help of the local clergy, Catholic churches served as shelters for illegal trade unions and anti-Francoist parties, as "the sanctity of the church, codified in Franco's 1953 Vatican Concordat, assured that the meeting would not be interrupted by the police".

The church often founded and engaged in human rights groups in the 20th century. The Committee of Cooperation for Peace in Chile was an anti-Pinochet group that was crucial in rescuing the victims of the regime, with its membership mostly including priests, nuns and middle-class Catholics. Similar Catholic groups were also organised in Brazil and Bolivia under authoritarian regimes there, where they endured police harassment. According to Józef Figa, the involvement of the Church in oppositionist groups was often very important for mobilising and uniting the opposition to authoritarian regimes. In Catalonia, opposition to the Franco regime "brought together members of the church and several illegal parties, including the Communists", while in Poland, Catholic opposition to the Communist regime was crucial in bridging a gap between intelligentsia oppositionist and worker and peasant organisations. Syzmon Chodak wrote: "The role of Catholic Clubs in unifying the opposition forces in Poland was spectacular. These legally independent Catholic organizations provided shop-windows for ideas and ideals of non-Catholics, left-wing socialists, humanists, and others as well as the church." Left-wing Catholic organisations that were common in Latin America and Europe, such as the Movement of Priests for the Third World, French worker-priests or Christians for Socialism not only provided aid to and organised working-class and urban poor Catholics, but also "provided a forum for contact between the middle class and the working class", especially in the context of opposing authoritarian regimes.

== Concordats ==
In dealing with hostile regimes, the Church has sometimes signed concordats, formal treaties which limit persecution of Catholic practices in return for concessions to the state. The Concordat of 1801, signed with Napoleon, reduced the persecution endured under the French Revolution in return for Church cooperation with Napoleon's rule. The Lateran Treaty of 1929 settled long-running disputes with Italy by recognising the independence of the Vatican City. The 1933 Reichskonkordat with the emergent Nazi Germany required clergy non-involvement in politics while allowing public practice of the Catholic faith. Similar purposes were served by the 2018 Holy See-China agreement which allowed Chinese government recommendation of bishops' appointments while permitting some practice of the faith.

== United States ==
During the 1930s in America, Father Coughlin, initially a left-wing radical supporter of Franklin D. Roosevelt's New Deal, Catholic priest and radio firebrand, expounded an anti-communist, social justice platform influenced by the Catholic faith. Coughlin later excoriated the Democratic Party, taking on an increasingly illiberal and anti-Semitic stance. The Catholic Church denounced Couglin's rhetoric for its anti-Semitism and hostility towards trade unions. The Archbishop of Detroit, Edward Aloysius Mooney, demanded Coughlin to cease his attacks on industrial unions such as the Congress of Industrial Organizations.

The Catholic Church encouraged Catholic workers to join the CIO "to improve their economic status and to act as a moderating force in the new labor movement". Catholic clergy promoted and founded moderate trade unions, such as the Association of Catholic Trade Unionists and the Archdiocesan Labor Institute in 1939. American Catholics of that era were generally New Deal liberals who actively supported the CIO, viewed government as a positive force for social reform and often participated in non-communist trade unions, becoming a prominent group of the United Auto Workers. According to Colleen Doody, Catholics were the "backbone and the bane of New Deal liberalism".

Catholics are instructed to participate in the political process, be informed voters, and to encourage elected officials to act on behalf of the common good. There are, however, limits to official Church political activity. The Church engages in issue-related activity, but avoids partisan political candidate activities since it might make them vulnerable to losing their tax-exempt status. An example of an issue-related activity the Catholic Church is legally able to support is the August, 2022 proposed amendment for an abortion ban in Kansas city. Of the $1.2 million raised in 2021 by the anti-abortion "Value Them Both Coalition," $500,000 was given by the Archdiocese of Kansas City and $250,000 was donated by the Catholic Diocese of Wichita, far higher amounts than other individual donations. This restriction does not apply to individuals or group provided they do not represent themselves as acting in an official Church capacity.

Every four years, the USCCB produces "Forming Consciences for Faithful Citizenship" (formerly "Faithful Citizenship") guides, to provide guidelines and explanations of Catholic teaching to Catholic voters. According to the United States Conference of Catholic Bishops, "the separation of church and state does not require division between belief and public action, between moral principles and political choices, but protects the right of believers and religious groups to practice their faith and act on their values in public life."

== See also ==
- Christian democracy
- Christianity and politics
- Distributism
- Evo Morales and the Roman Catholic Church
- History of Christian thought on persecution and tolerance § The mid-20th-century Spanish model
- Holy Roman Empire
- Integralism § Catholic integralism
- Liberation theology
- Papal States
- Political theology
- Relations between the Catholic Church and the State
- Religion and peacebuilding
- Rerum novarum
- Society of Jesus § Political intrigue
- Solidarity
- Temporal power (papal)
- Camilism
