= Benito Fontcuberta =

Spanish soldier and traditionalist intellectual (1843–1904)

Lieutenant colonel Benito Fontcuberta
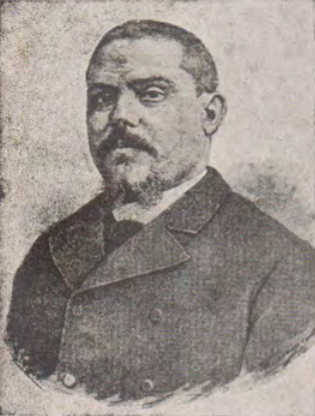

Personal details
- Born: 4 January 1843 Calaceite, Aragon, Spain.
- Died: 21 November 1904 (aged 61) Tortosa, Catalonia, Spain.
- Party: Comunión Tradicionalista; Integrist Party
- Education: University of Barcelona
- Occupation: Military commander, pharmacist, professor and journalist.

Military service
- Allegiance: Carlist rebels
- Rank: Lieutenant colonel
- Battles/wars: Third Carlist War

Benito Fontcuberta y Pardo (4 January 1843 – 21 November 1904) was a Spanish journalist, pharmacist and professor who served as a Carlist commander on the Third Carlist War.

Having led the rebel forces of Maestrazgo and Tarragona, after his military retirement Fontcuberta remained an influential figure of Spanish traditionalism through his Integrist newspaper Semanario de Tortosa.

== Biography ==
=== Youth and military actions ===
Fontcuberta studied Latin, Philosophy and Theology from 1855 to 1867 at Tortosa, and was awarded a baccalaureate with the rank of nemine discrepante. He traveled later to Tarragona to study land surveying and Fine Arts. After obtaining outstanding qualifications he was sent to the Universidad de Barcelona to study Pharmacy on 1868, finishing his career on 1871.

After the dethronement of Isabel II he was commissioned by fellow carlist chiefs to organize the revolutionary forces of the district of Valderrobres and the bordering towns of Gandesa and Alcañiz. Between 1870 and 1872 he was assigned to different military tasks until his formal adherence to the Carlist uprising in September 1873 under Tomás Segarra's command.

Leading a minor squad of 200 Aragonese volunteers, Fontcuberta achieved a series of minor-scale victories against liberals at Maella, Batea and Ulldecona forcing their capitulation. He defeated general Santa Pau at Morella and played an important role with his men at the victory of the acción de Ares the 25 November 1873.

Commanding 150 foot soldiers and 50 cavalrymen he fought the liberal forces of Amposta and Tortosa, and was finally assigned to 4 rebel compañías with which he successfully sieged Vinaroz in February 1874, being ascended to Commander afterwards.

As a commander he led the 5th Battalion of Maestrazgo, laid siege to Gandesa in June 1874 and was awarded at Villafranca del Cid the Second Class Red Cross of Military Merit. While directing the chemistry lab at the Hospital of Horta he was made a prisoner on 1875, but was soon released through an exchange. Once free he joined the Carlist Army of the North, led a rebel compañía at Puente la Reina and was made a lieutenant colonel shortly before the war finished. After the war he was imprisoned by the government at Tortosa, where he would reside until his death once being acquitted.

=== Intellectual activities ===
Fontcuberta founded and directed the traditionalist newspaper Semanario de Tortosa from 1882 to 1888. He sided with Ramón Nocedal on the Carlist schism, being expulsed from the Traditionalist Communion after expressing his support for an Integrist newspaper at Pamplona. He kept writing for other newspapers and became a local leader of the Integrist Party.

Using the pen name "Un teólogo de antaño" (a theologian from yesteryear) he published Félix Sardà y Salvany's articles that would be later compiled on the manifesto Liberalism Is a Sin, which had a lasting influence on Spanish politics.

Apart from his journalist career, Fontcuberta worked for 18 years as a mathematics professor at the Seminary of Tortosa and taught various subjects at the San Luis de Gonzaga College for 27 years until his death. He also served as a pharmacist at Roquetas.

Fontcuberta was also an active member of the Catholic Worker's Circle of Tortosa. He was also a renowned collaborator of the Society of Saint Vincent de Paul and would weekly visit the city's jail and hospital to do charitable works.

=== Death ===
Fontcuberta died of an apoplexy being 61 years old. El Siglo Futuro dedicated him an obituary stating that the Catholic Church in Spain had lost "not only one of her best soldiers, but also a model for gentlemen, christians and spaniards, one of those the World is lacking nowadays". Many other Carlist and catholic Tortosan newspapers paid homage to him: El Restaurador called him an "enthusiast soldier of Tradition, for whose defense he fought ardently both with his sword and his quill" and the Correo de Tortosa defined him as an "exemplar gentleman and most upright catholic".

He was married to Pilar Fontanet, with whom he had a daughter of her same name. Pilar Fontcuberta would later marry Joaquín Ferrer y Ferrer, jaimist deputy and chief of the Traditionalist Communion of Tortosa, Roquetas and Gandesa.

== Bibliography ==
- Oller, Francisco de Paula (1888). "Don Benito Font-Cuberta". Álbum de personajes carlistas (PDF). Vol. II. Barcelona. pp. 85–91. Archived from the original (PDF) on 15 February 2017.
