= Evo Morales and the Catholic Church =

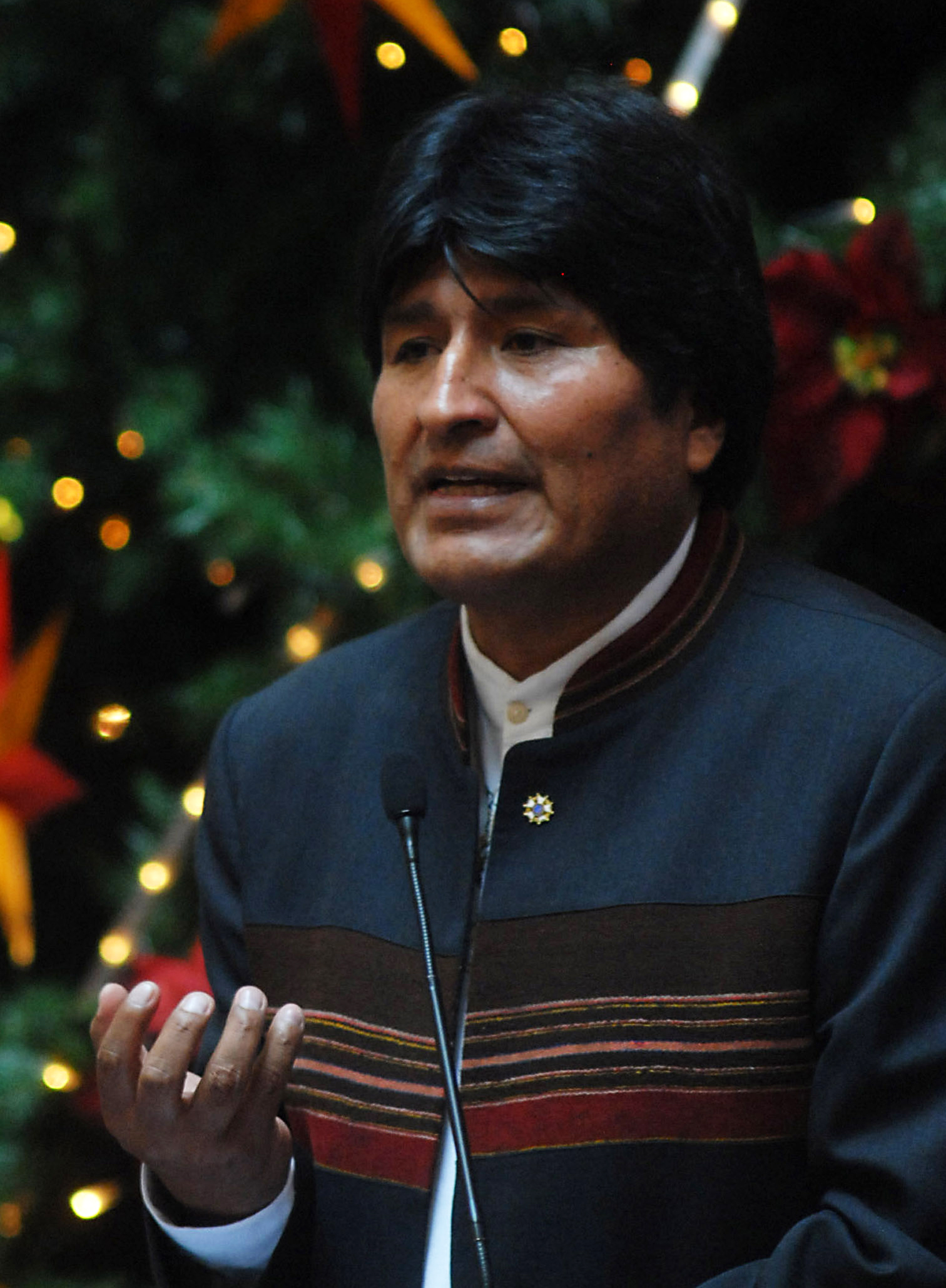
Evo Morales

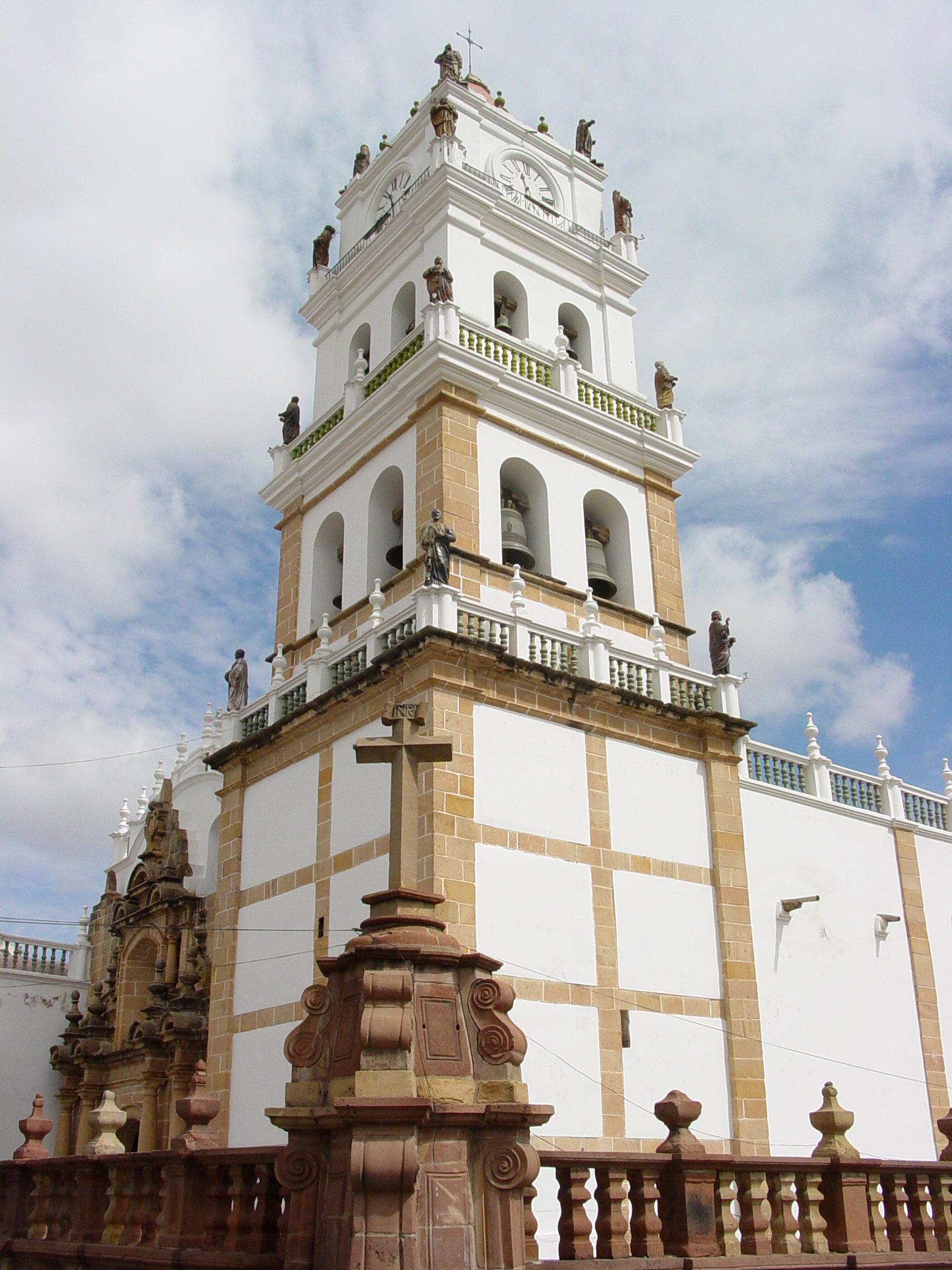
Metropolitan Cathedral of Sucre

The administration of former Bolivian president Evo Morales maintained a strained relationship with the Bolivian hierarchy of the Roman Catholic Church. This relationship posed a problem for Morales, as polls taken in the early 2000s indicated that about seven million of the nine million Bolivians adhered to the Roman Catholic faith.

When faced with a Morales policy that they disagreed with, such as the proposed secularization, liberalization, and modernization of schools, the Catholic bishops of Bolivia were able to inspire massive demonstrations against the measures. The Catholic Church drew most of its support from the cities and little from rural areas (where Morales drew his primary support) due to limited assets and the prevalence of traditional indigenous culture. Morales has stated that he is a Catholic. Morales, like many rural Bolivians, was raised with a combination of Catholicism and belief in the Pachamama in addition to Ekeko. Other indigenous leaders, such as Félix Patzi, follow a pure indigenous faith and reject Christianity. Even though there are leaders within this faith, there has not been a shift amongst Bolivians to become 'indigenous-belief only'. Morales later commented that he is only a Roman Catholic in order to attend wedding ceremonies. When asked if he believed in God, he responded: "I believe in the land, in my father and my mother, and in cuchi-cachi (sexual activity)."

The special status that used to be given to Catholicism in Bolivia can be seen in Article 3 of the former Bolivian Constitution (1967), which says, "The State recognizes and sustains the Catholic, Apostolic, and Roman Religion. It guarantees the public exercise of all other faiths. Relations with the Catholic Church shall be governed by concordats and agreements between the Bolivian State and the Holy See." The United States State Department characterized this as constitutional recognition of Catholicism as the state religion. However, after the enactment of the current Bolivian Constitution in 2009, the Roman Catholic church lost this official status. Article 4 of the new constitution states: "The State respects and guarantees the freedom of Religion and Spiritual beliefs, in accordance with every individual's cosmovisions. The State is independent of religion." This constitutional change, in addition to Morales' leftist policies, has contributed to the uneasy relationship between the Church and the State.

== Constitutional status of the Church ==
Until amendments made in 2009, the Bolivian Constitution gave special recognition to the Roman Catholic Church. The United States State Department understood this to be the establishment of the Church as the state religion.

On June 18, 2006, the Archbishop of Santa Cruz de la Sierra, Cardinal Julio Terrazas, addressed rumors being spread by some parliamentary candidates that the Catholic Church was demanding to be made the official religion of Bolivia. In his Sunday homily, the cardinal assured people that they were not championing the installation of Catholicism as the national religion. He noted that the bishops were receptive to notions of reviewing the Bolivian Constitution's article which granted special recognition to the role of Catholicism. The cardinal said, "They keep saying we are fighting for that article. Not so! Let it be reviewed, but let it be done intelligently and fully. Let's not deny that this country has truly received the seeds of the Kingdom of justice and of truth that the Lord has brought, and that that has been part of her history, and that is why in so many parts of Bolivia we are proud to be Catholics." The cardinal said that Catholicism had not been the official state religion of Bolivia since 1967, and that the Church was merely asking for "respect" and "recognition of the work she has done." He also mentioned that the church was not worried that Bolivia would become a secular state, but those calling for secularism had ulterior motives to strip Bolivia of religion and the presence of God.

=== Church land seized ===
In early June 2006, the socialist party of Evo Morales—Movimiento al Socialismo—seized lands adjacent to the Basilica of Our Lady of Copacabana. These lands had been given to the shrine decades before by the Bolivian government so that income derived from the use of the land would help support the shrine. At the seizure, party loyalists declared that they were taking only the land that the Church was not utilizing. The land was divided into seven lots, and several trees were cut down. Father Obermaier, in charge of the shrine, called for the government to resolve the situation.

=== Call to stop having Catholic feast days as national holidays ===
While the education reform controversy was ongoing, then-Senator Antonio Peredo joined with other members of Morales' Movimiento al Socialismo in the Bolivian Parliament to call for an end to recognizing Catholic feast days such as Corpus Christi and All Saints Day as national holidays. The suggested policy was to only recognize Holy Week and Christmas. For the nationally recognized holidays to change, the policy would need to have been approved by the full Parliament. The holidays were not dropped.

=== Catholic view on Constitutional reform ===
On January 18, 2007, Fr. Freddy del Villar, Vicar General of the Coroicu Diocese in Bolivia, said that the Catholic Church was being observant concerning the socialist Morales government and was still reserving judgment on the upcoming revision to the Bolivian Constitution. Though the Church was concerned, it remained confident about the improved constitution being prepared by the Morales administration. del Villar declared that with factions in Bolivia seemingly attempting to chip away at the unity of Bolivia, the Church played a role in maintaining said unity.

== Conflict over religious classes in state schools ==
In early June 2006, the Bolivian Education Minister Félix Patzi told reporters that under the Morales administration, education would no longer have a sole focus on Catholicism and would become secular, with religious studies becoming optional rather than mandatory. The curriculum would instead focus on the history of religion, including indigenous religions. The idea was to create a "secular education that respects the beliefs, the spirituality of indigenous and native nations and of the Bolivian nations as the basis of individual and communitarian rights." The Bolivian Roman Catholic hierarchy immediately opposed this proposal and saw it as an attack on religion in Bolivia. They were outspoken against the measure and organized protests against it.

=== Pro-Catholic Church Responses ===
==== Demonstrations and Criticism led by Bishops ====
In August 2006, the Bishop of Oruro, Cristobal Bialasik, led thousands of Catholic students and parents through the city's streets demanding that the Morales administration leave sectarian Catholic classes in the state schools. They also insisted that the government squash any suggestions toward amending Article 3 in the Bolivian Constitution, which officially recognized Roman Catholicism. Bishop Bialasik stated that peace and unity would only come to Bolivia "if we respect our faith, if we respect God… [and learn] to live the values that He teaches us." Auxiliary Bishop Luis Saenz of Cochabamba called on Catholics to protest: "Bolivia is a country of one people devoted to the one true God and his Blessed Mother. Mary, under her different titles, wants all Bolivians to be united.... [Let us pray that] God will illumine the darkness in order to extinguish lies and deceit ... because they want to silence us. God's message is free. God gives us the strength to guide our people. The Catholic Church shall not be enslaved. She is not a slave to the government because she is not a political party. Fear not, Bolivia, because the Church is born of God."

Immediately after Patzi's statements, Archbishop Tito Solari of Cochabamba said the Morales government must be consistent when it talks about respecting beliefs, which means respecting that a majority of Bolivians believe in Catholicism. He defended the existence of "covenant schools" which are administered by the hierarchy of the Catholic Church but are paid for by Bolivian taxes drawn from both Catholics and non-Catholics alike. Solari said, "Parents are the first and foremost educators of their children, therefore they have the right to choose the kind of education they want. ...[F]amilies are very appreciative of the schools that are administered by the Church, which serve the community and, in a special way, those in need." He defined what he thought was the proper role of the government saying, "The state and the institutions of civil society can contribute, in a democratic atmosphere, to people choosing the best educational model for the integral and critical formation of persons."

In June 2006, a spokeswoman for the Bolivian Bishops' Committee on Education demanded that the Morales administration clarify its position on religious instruction in state schools. She claimed that the committee was eager, out of concern, for the administration to come to a definitive position to open up a dialogue. She took issue with Patzi labeling the current system as "colonialist," saying he "is ignoring the Church's contribution to culture, education, health care, and development in Bolivia." She asserted that the Church respects other beliefs and is not asking for Catholicism to be forced upon the people. She accused the Morales administration of having an anti-faith bias and having an issue with the faith of Catholic Bolivians, which make up 80% of the population, rather than the Church itself.

Responding to Patzi's comments, the Archbishop of Santa Cruz, Cardinal Julio Terrazas Sandoval, called for Bolivian Catholics to defend their faith. He also called on President Morales to note "the difference between a lay State and a secular state that is hostile to religions. ...[The Catholic Church will defend] the universal right to profess a religion. This is unpronounceable and non-negotiable. This is the basis for helping to form a family that is much more united in the cause of the kingdom of justice and peace and to build a country that is not in constant turmoil." Bishop Jesus Juarez of El Alto accused the Morales administration of using "double-speak" in its educational policies. After the bishops' statements, Morales stressed that courses on the topic of religion were not going to be removed from public schools.

On July 23, 2006, Terrazas told Catholics they needed to stop being "passive" and defend the faith. He warned that wars have started because of small theories coupled with vices such as hate, rancor, and unforgiveness. Patzi then came out against the Catholic hierarchy stating, "They are saying we are going to destroy the Church and its beliefs. How untrue! Excellencies, do not lie to the people, give them the whole truth, the hard truth. The truth does not destroy. Hypocrisy sooner or later will become visible." By July 25, 2006, Catholic organizations had led street marches in cities including Santa Cruz and Tarija. After these protests Patzi went further in his claims, saying: "The Church is now showing her true face. The Church is now on the side of the oligarchy because for 514 years the Church has been at the service of the oligarchy and the rich. Nobody can deny it." Morales then came out in support of Patzi accusing the bishops of acting in the ways of the Inquisition. He claimed that the bishops were looking for the remnants of a fading power. Morales explained his comments to reporters, saying: "I want to ask the (church) hierarchies that they understand freedom of religion and beliefs in our country. It's not possible to impose their views. …[I am] worried by the behavior of some Catholic Church leaders who are acting like in times of the Inquisition."

==== Jorge Quiroga ====
In late July 2006, former Bolivian president Jorge Quiroga, who had lost the 2005 election to Morales, criticized the remarks of President Morales that compared the actions of the Roman Catholic hierarchy in Bolivia with the Inquisition. Quiroga cautioned that the use of that rhetoric must not be used since it incurs negative consequences. He declared he would champion the opposition against the government policies on religious classes, saying "Religion is an issue that should not be politicized. What we have clearly said (as the opposition) is that the teaching of religion be respected and we are going to defend it."

==== National Educational Congress walkout ====
During the July 2006 meeting of the National Educational Congress, delegates from the Bishops' Conference of Bolivia walked out, claiming the meeting "had become political and exclusive... the government is seeking to impose its new education law, which reflects an attitude that prevents dialogue about certain aspects of the future of education in Bolivia." In a late-night meeting, Education Minister Félix Patzi spoke with several bishops and pledged to uphold religious instruction in schools and respect the Church-State agreement, saying: "We recognize the contribution of the Church in the area of education, technical formation, and other areas. Religious subject matter will respect the diversity of religions and that is something we share with the Church, everyone has the right to practice the diversity of other religions, there was never any disagreement on that." Bishop Jesus Juarez of El Alto, together with Auxiliary Bishop Luis Sainz of Cochabamba, said that not only do parochial schools have a fundamental right to offer instruction according to their own confession but that in state schools parents must have the ability to determine which religious course their children attend. Bishop Sainz demanded the Morales administration "clarify and come up with a consensus about the concept of secular education so that there are no longer any doubts." At the end of its conference, the National Educational Congress led by Patzi approved a resolution saying, "Education in Bolivia is secular and pluralistic because it respects the spirituality of each culture and freedom of belief, it promotes its own values, and rejects every type of dogmatisms." They called for the "curricula [to] be adapted in accord with the diverse beliefs of the country". While Patzi had stated that the policy would only go into effect after its consideration by the Bolivian Parliament, after the Educational Congress approved the measure he declared that its conclusions "were binding and would be implemented immediately." This drew another wave of protests from Bolivian Catholics who demanded Patzi's resignation.

Archbishop Tito Solari described the Morales administration's actions at the event as operating "in a Communist fashion" and claimed that "the government [had] imposed its ideology without any room for dialogue." After the bishops' delegates left, those remaining approved the policy to expand the scope of the religious classes. Auxiliary Bishop Estanislao Dowlaszewicz of Santa Cruz characterized the results by saying, "Today some people live as if they were allergic to religion or the Church... [depicting it as] a danger for the future of the country…[they are trying to] remove not only religion from the classroom but God as well." Archbishop Edmundo Abastoflor of La Paz made comments believed to be in response to the education question. At a commemoration of Bolivian independence, in front of the attending Bolivian President Evo Morales, the archbishop declared, "It is crazy to think that God doesn't exist or that we can forget about Him. ... No matter how important we might be in this world, there is someone who is more so than us."

=== Anti-Catholic Church Responses ===
==== Announcement by Education Minister ====
In June 2006, Patzi incurred organizational opposition against the Morales government's declaration that "Catholicism would no longer be 'the official' religion taught at schools." Patzi said that he wanted to end "the religious monopoly" of the Catholic faith in schools and allow all faiths to be taught, "from oriental religions to those practiced by our native peoples." He said he would end the policy that made Catholic religious classes obligatory for students, and called the existing system "colonial". In an interview with the newspaper La Razon, Patz said, "In Bolivia the people are not only Catholic, but also of other religious faiths." He stated his fear of the issue "leading to confrontation among Bolivians".

After protests by the Catholic hierarchy, Patzi clarified that the sectarian Roman Catholic classes taught in state schools would be replaced with a "history of religions" class that would include a focus on traditional indigenous beliefs alongside Catholicism and other faiths practiced in Bolivia. The Morales government announced its policy as a call for "secular education that respects the beliefs, the spirituality of indigenous and native nations and of the Bolivian nations as the basis of individual and communitarian rights." It was announced that the proposal would come before the National Assembly for a vote on August 6, 2006.

==== Morales' reversal ====
The calls by the Catholic hierarchy to resist Morales' policy against sectarian religious classes in state schools caused a dip in his popularity. In mid-July 2006 the newspaper La Razon did a survey of 1,009 Bolivians living in the country's four major cities. The survey showed Morales with an approval rating of 68 percent, down from 75 percent in June. It also found that 83 percent of Bolivians surveyed had a favorable opinion of the Catholic Church.

On July 30, 2006, after a two-and-a-half-hour conference in Cochabamba with Terrazas, Morales ended the dispute by reversing his stance and backing away from the proposal. The Associated Press reported that in a joint statement that had discussed diversity of religion but did not provide a way to deviate from predominant Catholic curriculum that is already taught in Bolivian state schools. Both men came to the consensus that both the Morales administration and the Church would retain the religious classes while also taking into consideration the diversity of religion within the country.

==== Confederation of Inner City Education Workers of Bolivia ====
In September 2006, the Confederation of Inner City Education Workers of Bolivia in a proposal called "Rescuing the Homeland", requested a law that would eliminate all religious instruction in state schools including the 200 state-funded covenant schools which are administered by the Catholic Church. The proposal said, "Education should be secular if we want it to be scientific." In response, Church representatives cautioned that advancements made by the Catholic Church could be lost if the State were to take over the covenant schools and rallied to oppose any such proposals.

== 2019 Political Crisis ==
Bolivian Bishops previously opposed Morales's attempts to extend his presidency saying it "opens the doors to totalitarianism to the imposition of authority by force." In response, Adhemar Valda, high-ranking member of the Movement for Socialism, said that the clergymen exist "in the same vein as the US State Department."

In response to the months of violent protests resulting in the death of many protesters by security forces, Bishop Aurelio Pessoa called for a national dialogue involving all parties "to bring peace to the country and to agree on the conditions of new presidential elections and the election of new members of the Supreme Electoral Tribunal."
