= Typographic Workers Trade Union =

Typographic Workers Trade Union (in Spanish: Sindicato de Obreros Tipógrafos) was a trade union of typographers in Spain. Founded in 1897, it was the first Catholic trade union in the country.

== Sources ==
- La Organización Sindical Española, Escuela Sindical 1961. 1961: Madrid, page 27.
