= International Secretariat of Christian Trade Unions =

The International Secretariat of Christian Trade Unions was an international organisation of Christian trade unions. It was formed in Zürich August 2–5, 1908, by representatives of 8 European countries. The Secretariat was the fore-runner of the International Federation of Christian Trade Unions.
