= Unión Catolica Obrera =

Unión Catolica Obrera (Catholic Workers Union) was a Catholic trade union in Mexico, founded in 1908. The movement did however disappear at the time of the Mexican Revolution.
