= Félix Sardà y Salvany =

Spanish priest and writer (1844–1916)

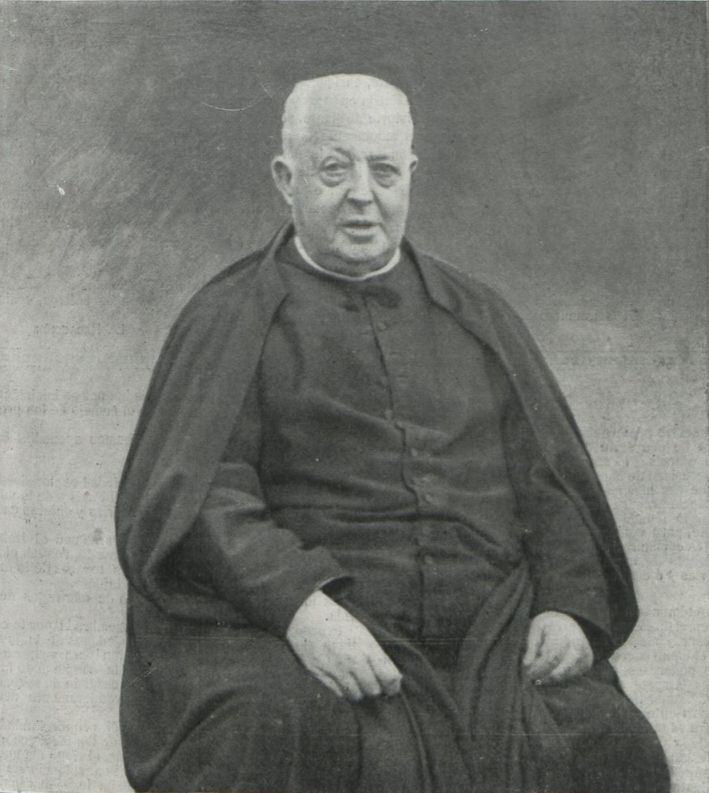
- Sardà in 1915

Personal life
- Born: 21 May 1844 Sabadell, Spain
- Died: 2 January 1916 (aged 71) Sabadell, Spain
- Notable work: Liberalism is a Sin

Religious life
- Religion: Catholic Church

Félix Sardà y Salvany (Catalan: Feliu or Fèlix Sardà i Salvany; May 21, 1844 – January 2, 1916) was a Spanish Catholic priest and writer born in Sabadell. He exercised an apostolate of charity and of the written word. Historian Roberto de Mattei reports that Sardà "was a popular priest in Spain at the end of the century and was considered exemplary for the firmness of his principles and the clarity of his apostolate."

== Revista popular ==
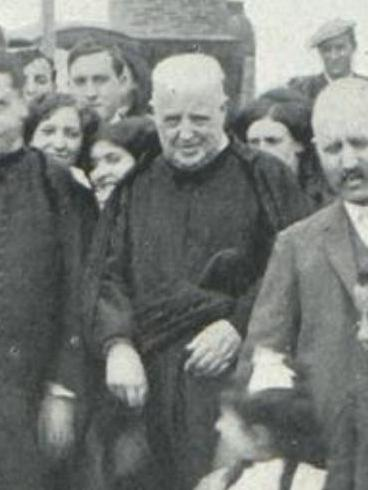
Sardà in 1911

For over forty years, he was the editor of the journal La Revista Popular, a weekly publication where all the current issues were discussed in light of the Catholic faith. From 1907 and until 1914, he published a series of twelve volumes entitled Progaganda católica: it is a vast collection of short books, pamphlets, articles and conferences. Sardà made use of his journal to publish a tirade of nine antisemitic pieces, La judiada ("the jewry"), describing Jews as "a moth gnawing at the log of Christian people" coming out openly to destroy Christianism by using a plan based on masonismo; in the view of Sardà, the understanding of masonismo should not be restricted to Freemasonry proper, but to liberalism in general.

The Spanish bibliography of reference, Encyclopedia of Orientation bibliografica, says that Don Sardà exercised an "apostolate of immense efficiency and resonance". He is also the author of a book on the Sacred Heart of Jesus, which was a great success and was reprinted until the late 1950s.

== Integrism ==
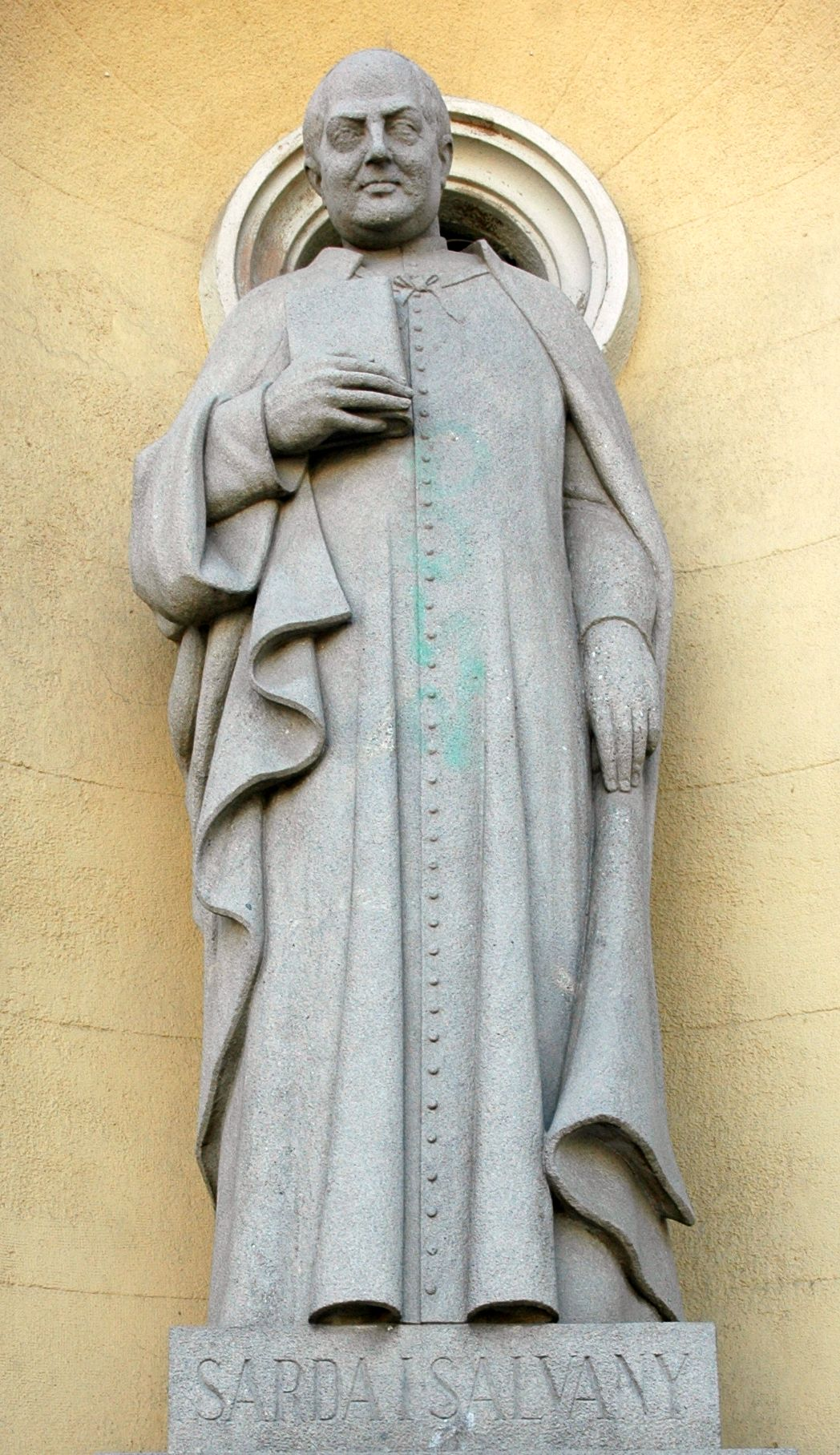
Statue of Sardà

Sardá is most famous for his works against liberalism (the ideas of personal autonomy and the separation of Church and State advocated by the Enlightenment). Sardá was among those that held liberals were not Catholic, and was called by his detractors as one of the "rigid ideologues" in this era of Spanish history. He condemned secularism and liberalism "as a sin and a poisonous sect for espousing 'the absolute sovereignty of the individual completely independent of God and of His authority; sovereignty of society absolutely independent of anything beyond itself; ...freedom of thought with no limitation whatsoever politically, morally, or religiously. ...[a condition that denied] the need for divine revelation.' ...[and resulted in a state] worse 'than being a blasphemer, thief, adulterer or murderer.'" Sardá held that liberalism was a grave sin that needed to be combated, developing the thought of Pope Pius IX he wrote "It must be said that liberalism in the idea is the absolute error, and in facts the absolute disorder. As a consequence, in both cases, it is a grave sin through its own nature ex genere suo, and extremely grave sin, a mortal sin."

=== Background ===
Sardá's writing against liberalism rose to notability after the liberal Revolution of 1868 had led to the First Spanish Republic with its promise and disappointments. This republican form of government in turn had fallen to a military coup led by Arsenio Martínez-Campos y Antón that returned the Spanish monarchy in the Bourbon Restoration of 1874.

The Catholic Church during the interregnum of 1868-1874 had many of its privileges removed along with its status as the official religion of Spain. The movement to disestablish Catholicism from a place of governmental privilege was especially intense during 1873 when the Spanish Republic embraced the concept of separation between Church and State and moved to have a secular state. With the return of the Bourbons, Catholicism was returned to its previous status of having governmental endorsement and its accompanying privileges over all other faiths and creeds. Article 11 of the Constitution of 1876 reaffirmed Catholicism as the official religion of the state, extending toleration to other creeds as long as all their speech and activities was done solely in private. (The move towards secularism would not begin again until the Second Republic in the early 1930s.)

Some of the civilian radicals who had supported the Revolution of 1868 were not just anticlerical but anti-religious which historian Noel Valis points to as "a sign of a growing alienation from the Church". Valis also points to the work of amateur sociologist Hugh James Rose, who was a Protestant chaplain to English, French and German mining companies in the Spanish mining city of Linares, Jaén. Rose collected anecdotes from the Spanish population on their views of religion which he included in the chapter "Decay of Faith in Spain" in his 1875 book Untrodden Spain. Rose concluded that "The Church of Spain... is an institution which has lost its hold on the masses, both educated and uneducated." Rose also stated that he observed in the Spanish a "sense of spiritual drift, of having come unanchored from their religious moorings." He recorded an increase of not only atheists and free thinkers but also a rise in the religiously indifferent and a decline of attendance at Catholic religious services. One literary man told Rose that he no longer believed in "the ceremonies or the rites of my Church; I pray to God at home" but that he has not publicly "renounced that credo; it is more convenient not to have an open rupture". In 1888 another observer found similar things as Rose stating that the educated classes "have lost their old belief, and have not found a new one." The Catholic Church itself had been calling for a spiritual revival in Spain since the 1700s feeling that there was a presence of "spiritual decay". While Spanish society was still religious, the question of what it meant to be Catholic in Spain, or who was a Catholic were being raised by the population and this led to a sense that the Church's authority and the foundations of its faith were being undermined.

Sardá, following the line of thought of Pius IX's 1864 encyclical Syllabus of Errors was among those who denounced secularism and blasted the liberals, maintaining that they were not Catholics. Those like Sardá who wanted a closer relationship between the Church and State were termed Integrists and held that liberalism denied "the need for divine revelation." Though vocal the Integrists remained a distinct minority within the Spanish Church. The Integrists opposed the efforts of Antonio Cánovas del Castillo despite him having been a conservative who had opposed freedom of religion and letting the lower classes have a vote or voice in government. It was Canovas attempts to find a middle way (a "conservative liberalism") that upset the Integrists. Canovas had been the principal author of the 1876 Constitution and the Integrists took particular exception to its much-debated article 11 that granted toleration to religious minorities. Other figures opposed by the Integrists also tried to find a middle-path between conservatives and liberalism these include Alejandro Pidal, Manuel Durán y Bas, Josep Coll i Vehí, and Juan Mane y Flaquer. The Integrists, motivated by a desire to prevent the introduction of temporal things into the spiritual, also found opposition within the Spanish Catholic clergy on "how to reconcile faith with historical change, with modernity."

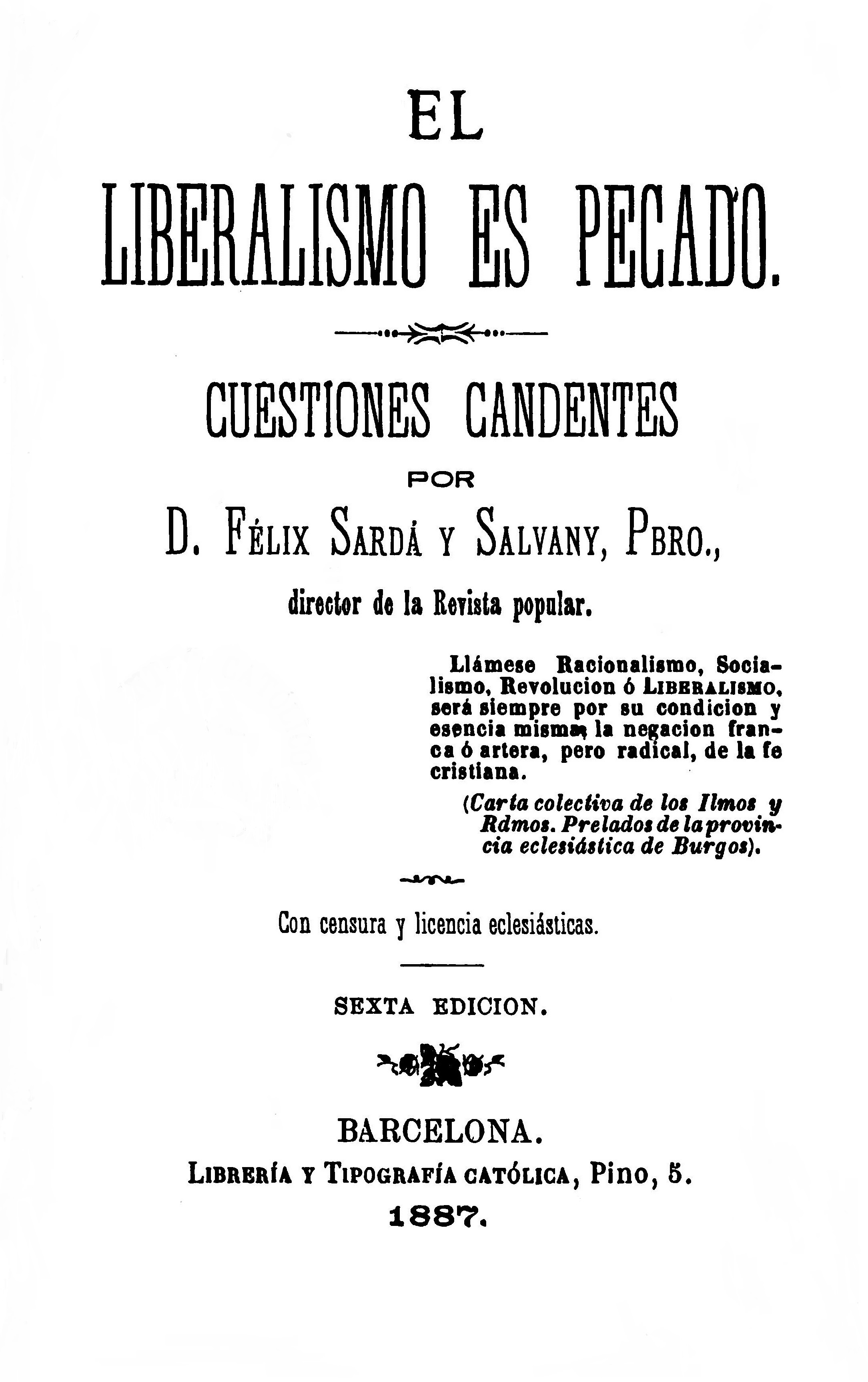
Title Page of the sixth edition of El liberalismo es pecado, 1887.

The critics of the Integrists and Sardá's journals and printed editorials questioned their use of mass-marketing techniques and the new freedom of the press and speech to spread their message (rather than relying on authority and traditional methods of communication) – this was seen as participating "in the very modernity they found so objectionable." Sardá also opted to try and combat liberalism in 1884 by calling for the founding of a Catholic political party (which again seemed to participate in the thing he was fighting against). He presented the call for a Catholic political party "as part of a national crusade, referring to Spain as 'the land of the eternal crusade.'"

=== Liberalism is a Sin ===
Sardá's most famous work was the 1884 book El liberalismo es pecado ('Liberalism is a Sin'). The book has been reprinted multiple times; by 1960 a 20th edition came out in Spain.
