= Liberalism is a Sin =

1884 book by Félix Sardà y Salvany

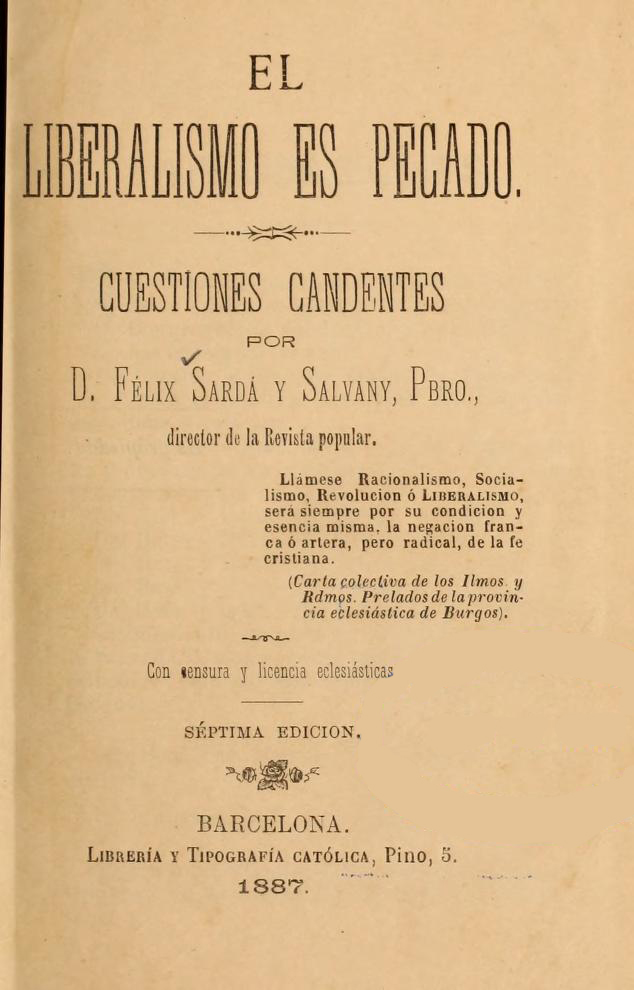
Cover of Liberalism Is a Sin

Liberalism is a Sin (Spanish: El liberalismo es pecado) is an 1884 book by the Spanish Catholic priest Félix Sardà y Salvany. It became a rallying point for conservative political movements such as Integralism and Carlism.

== Content ==
Sardà believed that liberalism is the "burning issue of our century" : it is the "radical and absolute negation of the sovereignty of God". It is all the more dangerous because it became an official legal error, introduced into the government of princes by powerful figures.

The pamphlet was written in a period that was favourable to anti-liberalism and Catholic integralism in the history of Spain: the First Spanish Republic had been overthrown in 1874 and the Bourbon dynasty had been restored to the throne. The writing had considerable success among the Carlist and Integrist movements.

Sardà drew heavily from the papal encyclicals Mirari vos of Pope Gregory XVI (1832), Quanta cura of Pope Pius IX and the attached Syllabus Errorum (1864) and other papal documents condemning liberalism.

== Reception ==
Under the direction of liberal-leaning Bishop Rev. Jacobo Catala Et Alboso, a rebuttal to Sardà's El liberalismo es pecado was written by the Catholic canon Celestino de Pazos from Vich entitled El proceso del integrismo: refutación de los errores que contiene el opúsculo del Dr. Sardá y Salvany "el liberalismo es pecado". Both works were sent to the Sacred Congregation of the Index and its secretary, Fr. Jerome Secheri OP, issued a statement on January 10, 1887, ruling for Sardà and finding errors in the rebuttal along with uncharitable insinuations about Sardà.

Historian Noel Valis points out that "During the Spanish Civil War, in a propaganda pamphlet, the Republican supporter Langdon-Davies pointed out to English Catholics that the same sentiment (liberalism is a sin) could be found in a popular catechism by Angel Maria de Arcos."

== Versions ==
A translation of Sardà's El liberalismo es pecado into English was created by Condé B. Pallen, entitled What Is Liberalism?. The translation was first published in 1899 and reprinted many times including in 1979 and 1989.
