= 1903 Spanish general election =

- 26 April 1903 (Congress); 10 May 1903 (Senate)

All 403 seats in the Congress of Deputies and 180 (of 360) seats in the Senate 202 seats needed for a majority in the Congress of Deputies
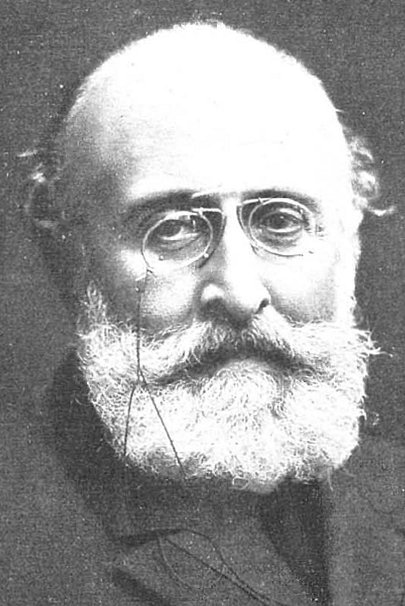

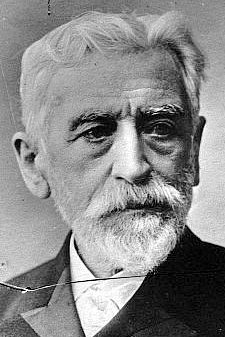

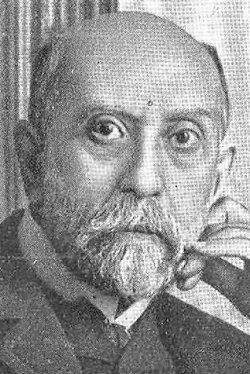

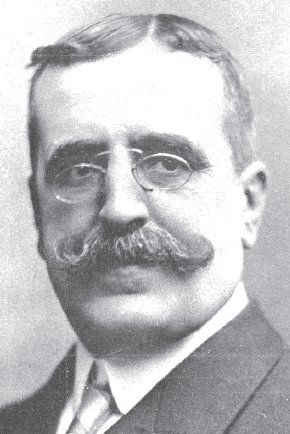

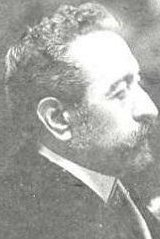
	First party	Second party	Third party
Leader	Francisco Silvela	Eugenio Montero Ríos	Nicolás Salmerón
Party	Conservative	Liberal	Republican
Leader since	1899	1902	1903
Leader's seat	Piedrahita	Senator (for life)	Barcelona
Last election	91 D · 41 S (Note: Results for PC (76 deputies and 38 senators) and G (15 deputies and 3 senators) in the 1901 election.)	252 D · 117 S (Note: Results for PL (246 deputies and 116 senators) and UN (6 deputies and 1 senator) in the 1901 election.)	15 D · 3 S (Note: Results for PRN (12 deputies and 2 senators), RI (2 deputies and 0 senators) and PRC (1 deputy and 1 senator) in the 1901 election.)
Seats won	228 D · 101 S	95 D · 50 S	28 D · 1 S
Seat change	▲137 D · ▲60 S	▼157 D · ▼67 S	▲13 D · ▼2 S
	Fourth party	Fifth party	Sixth party
Leader	José Canalejas	None (Note: Its leader, Carlos O'Donnell, had died on 9 February 1903.)	José María Vallés
Party	Democratic	Tetuanist	Federal
Leader since	1902	—	1901
Leader's seat	Alcoy	—	La Bisbal
Last election	Did not contest	10 D · 7 S	2 D · 0 S
Seats won	9 D · 4 S	6 D · 6 S	8 D · 1 S
Seat change	▲9 D · ▲4 S	▼4 D · ▼1 S	▲6 D · ▲1 S
- Election results by Congress of Deputies electoral constituency and district
Prime Minister before election
Francisco Silvela
Conservative
Prime Minister after election
Francisco Silvela
Conservative

A general election was held in Spain on 26 April 1903 (for the Congress of Deputies), and on 10 May 1903 (for the Senate), to elect the members of the 11th Cortes under the Spanish Constitution of 1876, during the Restoration period. All 403 seats in the Congress of Deputies were up for election, as well as 180 of 360 seats in the Senate.

Since the Pact of El Pardo, an informal system known as turno or turnismo was operated by the monarchy and the country's two main parties—the Conservatives and the Liberals—to determine in advance the outcome of elections by means of electoral fraud, often achieved through the territorial clientelistic networks of local bosses (the caciques), ensuring that both parties would have rotating periods in power. As a result, elections were often neither truly free nor fair, though they could be more competitive in the country's urban centres where caciquism was weaker.

Prime Minister Práxedes Mateo Sagasta's last period in power was dominated by the rise of Catalan regionalism and a string of worker strikes, as well as a number of issues—such as the religious and the educational questions—in which the government's results were mixed. A deteriorating health condition forced Sagasta's resignation on 6 December 1902, with power being handed over to Francisco Silvela and his Conservative Party; Sagasta would end up dying one month later, on 5 January. As a result, 1903 was the first election in the Restoration period not to be contested either by Sagasta or by Antonio Cánovas del Castillo, both of whom had been the regime's pillars by ensuring its duration and stability for decades. It was also the first election with Alfonso XIII as King regnant, following his coming of age and the end of his mother's regency.

== Background ==
Following the Bourbon Restoration in 1874, the Spanish Constitution of 1876 enshrined Spain as a semi-constitutional monarchy, awarding the monarch—under the royal prerogative—the right of legislative initiative together with the bicameral Cortes; the capacity to veto laws passed by the legislative body; the power to appoint government members (including the prime minister); the ability to grant or deny parliamentary dissolution, the adjournment of legislative sessions and the signature of royal decrees; as well as the title of commander-in-chief of the armed forces. The monarch would play a key role in the turno system by appointing and dismissing governments, which would then organize elections to provide themselves with a parliamentary majority. This informal system allowed the two major "dynastic" political parties at the time, the Conservatives and the Liberals—characterized as oligarchic, elite parties with loose structures dominated by internal factions, each led by powerful individuals—to alternate in power by means of electoral fraud (pucherazo). This was achieved by assigning candidates to districts before the elections were held (encasillado), then arrange their victory through the links between the Ministry of Governance and the territorial clientelistic networks of provincial governors and local bosses (the caciques), excluding minor parties from the power sharing.

The last period in power of Práxedes Mateo Sagasta (1901–1902) saw the coming of age of King Alfonso XIII in May 1902, but also the continuation of the social and regionalist conflicts that had afflicted previous governments. A general strike in Barcelona in February 1902 was violently suppressed, while the government proved unable to address the improvement of labour conditions demanded by the working classes. Sagasta's cabinet also proved unable to resolve the religious question—regarding a disproportionate growth in the establishment of religious congregations, considered contrary to law—nor to tackle Catalan regionalism through decentralizing formulas, but was able to approve a major reform of the education system underwent by the Count of Romanones, public instruction minister (comprising a new study plan in secondary education, the reestablishment of academic freedom, the attribution to the State of the payment of primary school teachers and an expansion of compulsory schooling).

Sagasta tendered his resignation as prime minister two times throughout 1902—first to Queen Regent Maria Christina in March, then to the newly-crowned King Alfonso XIII in November—but they were both rejected. However, growing criticism from the opposition, waning support within his party and a deteriorating health condition forced his final resignation on 6 December and the entrustment of power to Francisco Silvela of the Conservative Party. Sagasta would die of bronchopneumonia one month after leaving office, on 5 January 1903, at age 77.

== Overview ==
Under the 1876 Constitution, the Spanish Cortes were conceived as "co-legislative bodies", forming a nearly perfect bicameral system. Both the Congress of Deputies and the Senate exercised legislative, oversight and budgetary functions, sharing almost equal powers, except in budget laws (taxation and public credit)—whose first reading corresponded to Congress—and in impeachment processes against government ministers, where Congress handled indictment and the Senate the trial.

=== Date ===
The term of each chamber of the Cortes—the Congress and one-half of the elective part of the Senate—expired five years from the date of their previous election, unless they were dissolved earlier. The previous elections were held on 19 May 1901 for the Congress and on 2 June 1901 for the Senate, which meant that the chambers' terms would have expired on 19 May and 2 June 1906, respectively.

The monarch had the prerogative to dissolve both chambers at any given time—either jointly or separately—and call a snap election. There was no constitutional requirement for concurrent elections to the Congress and the Senate, nor for the elective part of the Senate to be renewed in its entirety except in the case that a full dissolution was agreed by the monarch. Still, there was only one case of a separate election (for the Senate in 1877) and no half-Senate elections taking place under the 1876 Constitution.

The Cortes were officially dissolved on 26 March 1903, with the corresponding decree setting election day for 26 April (Congress) and 10 May 1903 (Senate) and scheduling for both chambers to reconvene on 18 May.

=== Electoral system ===
Voting for the Congress of Deputies was based on universal manhood suffrage, comprising all Spanish national males over 25 years of age with full civil rights, provided they had two years of residence in a Spanish municipality and were not enlisted ranks in active duty. Additional restrictions excluded those deprived of political rights or barred from public office by a final sentence, criminally imprisoned or convicted, legally incapacitated, bankrupt, public debtors, and homeless.

The Congress of Deputies had one seat per 50,000 inhabitants. Of these, those corresponding to larger urban areas were elected in multi-member constituencies using partial block voting: voters in constituencies electing eight seats or more could choose up to three candidates less than the number of seats at stake; in those with between four and eight seats, up to two less; and in those with between one and four seats, up to one less. The remaining seats were elected in single-member districts by plurality voting and distributed among the provinces of Spain according to population. Additionally, universities, economic societies of Friends of the Country and officially organized chambers of commerce, industry and agriculture, had one seat per 5,000 registered voters.

As a result of the aforementioned allocation, 308 single-member districts were established, and each Congress multi-member constituency (a total of 27, electing 95 seats) was entitled the following seats:

Seats	Constituencies
8	Madrid
7	Barcelona
5	Palma, Seville
4	Cartagena
3	Alicante, Almería, Badajoz, Burgos, Cádiz, Córdoba, Granada, Huelva^{(+2)}, Jaén, Jerez de la Frontera, La Coruña, Lugo, Málaga, Murcia, Oviedo, Pamplona, Santa Cruz de Tenerife, Santander, Tarragona, Valencia, Valladolid, Zaragoza

Voting for the elective part of the Senate was based on censitary suffrage, comprising Spanish male householders of voting age, residing in a Spanish municipality, with full political and civil rights, who met either of the following:

- Being qualified electors (such as archbishops, bishops and cathedral chapter members, in the archdioceses; full academics, in the royal academies; university authorities and professors, in the universities; or provincial deputies);
- Being elected as delegates (either by members with three years of seniority (in the economic societies of Friends of the Country; or by major taxpayers for direct taxes and local authorities, in the local councils).

180 Senate seats were elected using indirect, two-round majority voting. Delegates chosen by local councils—each of which was assigned an initial minimum of one delegate, with one additional delegate for every six councillors—voted for senators together with provincial deputies. The provinces of Barcelona, Madrid and Valencia were allocated four seats each, and the rest three each, for a total of 150. The remaining 30 seats were allocated to special institutional districts (one each), including major archdioceses, royal academies, universities, and economic societies, (Note: The following were considered as the major districts in each category: Archdioceses: Burgos, Granada, Santiago de Compostela, Seville, Tarragona, Toledo, Valencia, Valladolid, and Zaragoza.; Royal academies: Spanish; History; Fine Arts of San Fernando; Exact, Physical and Natural Sciences; Moral and Political Sciences; and Medicine.; Universities: Madrid, Barcelona, Granada, Oviedo, Salamanca, Santiago, Seville, Valencia, Valladolid, and Zaragoza.; Economic societies of Friends of the Country: Madrid, Barcelona, León, Seville, and Valencia.) each elected by their own qualified electors or delegates. Another 180 seats consisted of senators in their own right (such as the monarch's offspring and the heir apparent once coming of age (16), grandees of Spain with an income of Pts 60,000, certain general officers—captain generals and admirals—the Patriarch of the Indies and archbishops, and the heads of higher courts and state institutions (Note: These comprised the Council of State, the Supreme Court, the Court of Auditors and the Supreme Council of War and Navy.) after two years of service), as well as senators for life directly appointed by the monarch.

The law provided for by-elections to fill vacant seats during the legislative term. At least two vacancies were required to trigger a by-election in Congress multi-member constituencies.

== Candidates ==
=== Nomination rules ===
For the Congress, secular Spanish males of voting age, with full civil rights, could run for election. Causes of ineligibility applied to those excluded from voting or meeting any of the incompatibility rules for deputies, as well as to:

- Public contractors, within their relevant territories;
- Holders of a number of territorial posts (such as government-appointed positions, not including government ministers and Central Administration employees; local and provincial employees; and provincial deputation members), within their areas of jurisdiction, during their term of office and up to one year afterwards.

For the Senate, eligibility was limited to Spanish males over 35 years of age not under criminal prosecution, disfranchisement nor asset seizure, and who either qualified as senators in their own right or belonged (or had belonged) to certain categories:

- Provided an income of Pts 7,500: the presidents of the Senate and the Congress; deputies serving in three different congresses or eight terms; government ministers; bishops; grandees of Spain not eligible as senators in their own right; and various senior officials after two years of service (such as certain general officers—lieutenant generals and vice admirals—and members of higher courts and state institutions); heads of diplomatic missions abroad (ambassadors after two years, and plenipotentiaries after four); heads and full academics in the royal academies; chief engineers; and full professors with four years of service;
- Provided an income of Pts 20,000 or being taxpayers with a minimum quota of Pts 4,000 in direct taxes (paid two years in advance): Spanish nobility; and former deputies, provincial deputies or mayors in provincial capitals or towns over 20,000;
- Having served as senators before the promulgation of the 1876 Constitution.

Other ineligibility provisions for the Senate also applied to a number of territorial officials within their areas of jurisdiction, during their term of office and up to three months afterwards; public contractors; tax collectors; and public debtors.

Incompatibility rules barred representing multiple constituencies simultaneously, as well as combining:

- The role of senator with other legislative roles (deputy, senator and local councillor, except those in Madrid; and provincial deputies within their respective provinces); or with any public post not explicitly permitted under Senate eligibility requirements;
- The role of deputy with any other civil, military or judicial post, with exceptions—and as many as 40 deputies allowed to simultaneously benefit from these—including a number of specific posts based in Madrid, such as any of the aforementioned ones (provided a public salary of Pts 12,500); senior court officials; university authorities and professors; chief engineers; and general officers.

== Results ==
=== Congress of Deputies ===
← Summary of the 26 April 1903 Congress of Deputies election results →
Parties and alliances	Popular vote		Seats
Parties and alliances	Votes	%	Seats
Conservative Party (PC)			228
Liberal Party (PL)			95
Republican Union (UR)			28
Democratic Party (PD)			9
Federal Republican Party (PRF)			8
Liberal Reformist Party (PLR)			7
Traditionalist Communion (Carlist) (CT)			7
Tetuanist Conservatives (T)			6
Regionalist League (LR)			4
Integrist Party (PI)			3
Independents (INDEP)			8
Total			403
Votes cast / turnout			
Abstentions			
Registered voters			

Seats
PC	56.58%
PL	23.57%
UR	6.95%
PD	2.23%
PRF	1.99%
CT	1.74%
PLR	1.74%
T	1.49%
LR	0.99%
PI	0.74%
INDEP	1.99%

=== Senate ===
← Summary of the 10 May 1903 Senate of Spain election results →
Parties and alliances	Seats
Conservative Party (PC)	101
Liberal Party (PL)	50
Tetuanist Conservatives (T)	6
Democratic Party (PD)	4
Regionalist League (LR)	2
Republican Union (UR)	1
Traditionalist Communion (Carlist) (CT)	1
Federal Republicans Party (PRF)	1
Liberal Reformist Party (PLR)	1
Independents (INDEP)	4
Archbishops (ARCH)	9
Total elective seats	180

Seats
PC	56.11%
PL	27.78%
T	3.33%
PD	2.22%
LR	1.11%
UR	0.56%
PRF	0.56%
CT	0.56%
PLR	0.56%
INDEP	2.22%
ARCH	5.00%

=== Maps ===
Election results by constituency (Congress).

=== Distribution by group ===
Summary of political group distribution in the 11th Restoration Cortes (1903–1905)
Group	Parties and alliances	C	S	Total
PC	Conservative Party (PC)	227	99	329
PC	Basque Dynastics (Urquijist) (DV)	1	2	329
PL	Liberal Party (PL)	93	49	145
PL	Liberal Coalition (CL)	2	1	145
UR	Republican Union (UR)	28	1	29
PD	Democratic Party (PD)	9	4	13
T	Tetuanist Conservatives (T)	6	6	12
PRF	Federal Republican Party (PRF)	8	1	9
CT	Traditionalist Communion (Carlist) (CT)	7	1	8
PLR	Liberal Reformist Party (PLR)	7	1	8
LR	Regionalist League (LR)	4	2	6
PI	Integrist Party (PI)	3	0	3
INDEP	Independents (INDEP)	6	4	12
INDEP	Independent Catholics (CAT)	2	0	12
ARCH	Archbishops (ARCH)	0	9	9
Total		403	180	583

== Bibliography ==
Legislation

- Ley mandando que los distritos para las elecciones de Diputados a Cortes sean los que se expresan en la división adjunta (PDF) (Law). Madrid Gazette (in Spanish). 1 January 1871.
- Constitución de la Monarquía Española (PDF) (Constitution). Madrid Gazette (in Spanish). 30 June 1876.
- Ley electoral de Senadores (PDF) (Law). Madrid Gazette (in Spanish). 8 February 1877.
- Ley electoral de los Diputados a Cortes (PDF) (Law). Madrid Gazette (in Spanish). 28 December 1878.
- Ley enumerando los empleos con los cuales es compatible el cargo de Diputado a Cortes (PDF) (Law). Madrid Gazette (in Spanish). 7 March 1880.
- Ley dividiendo la provincia de Guipúzcoa en distritos para la elección de Diputados a Cortes (PDF) (Law). Madrid Gazette (in Spanish). 23 June 1885.
- Ley dividiendo el distrito electoral de Tarrasa en dos, que se denominarán de Tarrasa y de Sabadell (PDF) (Law). Madrid Gazette (in Spanish). 18 January 1887.
- Ley reformando el art. 4º. de la ley de Incompatibilidades (PDF) (Law). Madrid Gazette (in Spanish). 31 July 1887.
- Ley fijando la división de la provincia de Álava en distritos electorales para Diputados a Cortes (PDF) (Law). Madrid Gazette (in Spanish). 10 July 1888.
- Ley electoral para Diputados a Cortes (PDF) (Law). Madrid Gazette (in Spanish). 26 June 1890.
- Ley disponiendo que las primeras y sucesivas elecciones que se verifiquen en la provincia de Zamora se dividirá en siete distritos en la forma que se expresa (PDF) (Law). Madrid Gazette (in Spanish). 18 June 1895.
- Leyes aprobando la división electoral de las provincias de León y Vizcaya (PDF) (Law). Madrid Gazette (in Spanish). 2 August 1895.
- Leyes aprobando la división electoral en las provincias de Sevilla y de Barcelona (PDF) (Law). Madrid Gazette (in Spanish). 5 July 1898.
- Real decreto disponiendo el número de Senadores que han de elegir las provincias que se citan (PDF) (Royal Decree). Madrid Gazette (in Spanish). 16 March 1899.
- Ley mandando que en lo sucesivo sean cuatro los Diputados a Cortes que elegirá la circunscripción electoral de Cartagena (PDF) (Law). Madrid Gazette (in Spanish). 7 August 1899.
- Ley estableciendo una circunscripción para elegir tres Diputados a Cortes, que la constituirán los cuatro partidos judiciales de Ayamonte, Hueva, Moguer y la Palma, con todas las poblaciones que de ellos forman parte (PDF) (Law). Madrid Gazette (in Spanish). 24 March 1902.
- Real decreto declarando disueltos al Congreso de los Diputados y parte electiva del Senado, y disponiendo que las Cortes se reúnan en Madrid el 18 de Mayo próximo (PDF) (Royal Decree). Madrid Gazette (in Spanish). 26 March 1903.

Other

- Fernández Almagro, Melchor (1943). "Las Cortes del siglo XIX y la práctica electoral" (PDF). Revista de Estudios Políticos (in Spanish) (9–10). Madrid: Centre for Political and Constitutional Studies: 383–419. ISSN 0048-7694.
- Calero, Antonio María (1987). "La prerrogativa regia en la Restauración: teoría y práctica (1875-1902)" (PDF). Revista de Estudios Políticos (in Spanish) (55). Madrid: Centre for Political and Constitutional Studies: 273–315. ISSN 0048-7694.
- Ortega Álvarez, Luis; Santaolaya Machetti, Pablo (1996). "Evolución histórica del sistema electoral español". Revista de las Cortes Generales (in Spanish). 37. Cortes Generales: 65–107. doi:10.33426/rcg/1996/37/784. ISSN 0213-0130.
- Martorell Linares, Miguel Ángel (1997). "La crisis parlamentaria de 1913-1917. La quiebra del sistema de relaciones parlamentarias de la Restauración" (PDF). Revista de Estudios Políticos (in Spanish) (96). Madrid: Centre for Political and Constitutional Studies: 137–161. ISSN 0048-7694.
- Martínez Ruiz, Enrique; Maqueda Abreu, Consuelo; De Diego, Emilio (1999). Atlas histórico de España. El Reinado de Alfonso XIII (1902-1931) (in Spanish). Vol. 2. Bilbao: Ediciones KAL. pp. 121–132. ISBN 9788470903502.
- Armengol i Segú, Josep; Varela Ortega, José (2001). El poder de la influencia: geografía del caciquismo en España (1875-1923) (in Spanish). Madrid: Marcial Pons. pp. 655–776. ISBN 9788425911521.
- García Muñoz, Montserrat (2002). "La documentación electoral y el fichero histórico de diputados". Revista General de Información y Documentación (in Spanish). 12 (1): 93–137. ISSN 1132-1873.
- Carreras de Odriozola, Albert; Tafunell Sambola, Xavier (2005) [1989]. Estadísticas históricas de España, siglos XIX-XX (PDF) (in Spanish). Vol. 1 (II ed.). Bilbao: Fundación BBVA. pp. 1072–1097. ISBN 84-96515-00-1. Archived from the original (PDF) on 24 September 2015.
- De Miguel Salanova, Santiago (2016). "La Unión Republicana en el corazón de la Monarquía. El triunfo electoral de 1903". Historia Contemporánea (in Spanish). 53. Madrid: University of the Basque Country: 553–591. doi:10.1387/hc.16732. hdl:10810/38306. ISSN 1130-2402.
- Martínez Relanzón, Alejandro (2017). "Political Modernization in Spain Between 1876 and 1923". Annales Universitatis Mariae Curie-Skłodowska, Sectio K. 24 (1). Madrid: Maria Curie-Skłodowska University: 145–154. doi:10.17951/k.2017.24.1.145. S2CID 159328027.
