= 1905 Spanish general election =

- 10 September 1905 (Congress); 24 September 1905 (Senate)

All 404 seats in the Congress of Deputies and 180 (of 360) seats in the Senate 203 seats needed for a majority in the Congress of Deputies
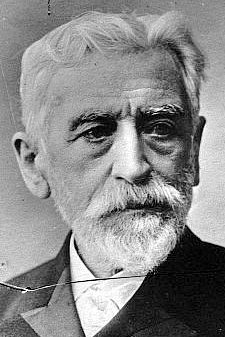

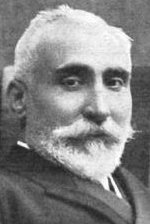

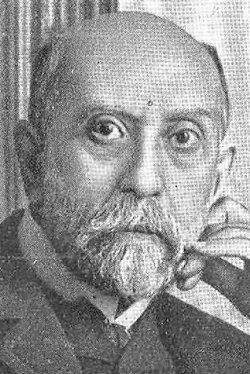

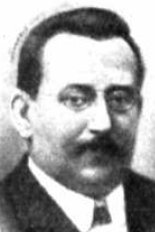

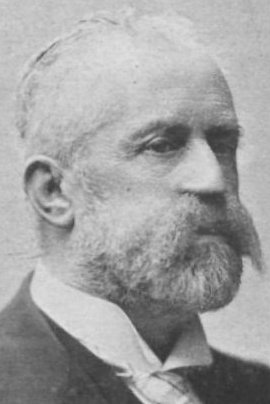
	First party	Second party	Third party
Leader	Eugenio Montero Ríos	Antonio Maura	Nicolás Salmerón
Party	Liberal–Democratic	Conservative	Republican
Leader since	1905	11 November 1903	1903
Leader's seat	Senator (for life)	Palma	Barcelona
Last election	104 D · 54 S (Note: Results for PL (95 deputies and 50 senators) and PD (9 deputies and 4 senators) in the 1903 election.)	234 D · 107 S (Note: Results for PC (228 deputies and 101 senators) and T (6 deputies and 6 senators) in the 1903 election.)	28 D · 1 S
Seats won	226 D · 108 S	105 D · 48 S	25 D · 1 S
Seat change	▲122 D · ▲54 S	▼129 D · ▼59 S	▼3 D · 0 S
	Fourth party	Fifth party	Sixth party
Leader	None (Note: Its leader, Raimundo Fernández-Villaverde, had died on 15 July 1905.)	Enric Prat de la Riba	Francisco Romero Robledo
Party	Villaverdist	Regionalist	Liberal Reformist
Leader since	—	1902	1898
Leader's seat	—	Did not run	Antequera
Last election	Did not contest	4 D · 2 S	7 D · 1 S
Seats won	16 D · 4 S	7 D · 2 S	7 D · 1 S
Seat change	▲16 D · ▲4 S	▲3 D · 0 S	0 D · 0 S
Prime Minister before election
Eugenio Montero Ríos
Liberal
Prime Minister after election
Eugenio Montero Ríos
Liberal

A general election was held in Spain on 10 September 1905 (for the Congress of Deputies), and on 24 September 1905 (for the Senate), to elect the members of the 12th Cortes under the Spanish Constitution of 1876, during the Restoration period. All 404 seats in the Congress of Deputies were up for election, as well as 180 of 360 seats in the Senate.

The informal turno system had allowed the country's two main parties—the Conservatives and the Liberals—to alternate in power by determining in advance the outcome of elections through electoral fraud, often facilitated by the territorial clientelistic networks of local bosses (the caciques). The absence of politically authoritative figureheads since the deaths of Cánovas and Sagasta, together with the national trauma from the Spanish–American War, weakened the internal unity of both parties and allowed faction leaders and local caciques to strengthen their positions as power brokers. Sagasta's death plunged the Liberal Party into turmoil, with an inconclusive leadership contest between Eugenio Montero Ríos and Segismundo Moret seeing the former temporarily splitting (together with supporters of José Canalejas and José López Domínguez) into the Liberal Democratic Party.

Francisco Silvela's second tenure as prime minister of Spain was short-lived, as he resigned in July 1903 over disagreements between the Crown and Antonio Maura over the latter's management of election preparations as Governance minister—which had led to a strong performance by anti-monarchist forces in urban districts in the 1903 election—and amid a growing rivalry with Finance minister Raimundo Fernández-Villaverde, a defender of orthodox economics who opposed Maura's deficit spending. A five-month long cabinet under Villaverde fell after most of the Conservatives coalesced around Maura as new party leader, but a government attempt by the latter collapsed in December 1904, following King Alfonso XIII's interference in the appointment of a new Chief of the Central Staff of the Army. The inability of any other Conservative leader to command the party's majority in parliament thwarted two government attempts by Marcelo Azcárraga and Villaverde (who had split into his own political faction), leading to a new Liberal "turn" under Montero Ríos.

== Background ==
Following the Bourbon Restoration in 1874, the Spanish Constitution of 1876 enshrined Spain as a semi-constitutional monarchy, awarding the monarch—under the royal prerogative—the right of legislative initiative together with the bicameral Cortes; the capacity to veto laws passed by the legislative body; the power to appoint government members (including the prime minister); the ability to grant or deny parliamentary dissolution, the adjournment of legislative sessions and the signature of royal decrees; as well as the title of commander-in-chief of the armed forces. The monarch would play a key role in the turno system by appointing and dismissing governments, which would then organize elections to provide themselves with a parliamentary majority. This informal system allowed the two major "dynastic" political parties at the time, the Conservatives and the Liberals—characterized as oligarchic, elite parties with loose structures dominated by internal factions, each led by powerful individuals—to alternate in power by means of electoral fraud (pucherazo). This was achieved by assigning candidates to districts before the elections were held (encasillado), then arrange their victory through the links between the Ministry of Governance and the territorial clientelistic networks of provincial governors and local bosses (the caciques), excluding minor parties from the power sharing.

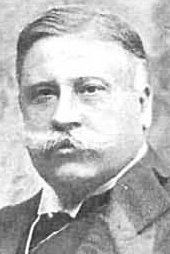
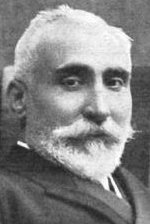
The feud between Raimundo Fernández-Villaverde (left) and Antonio Maura (right) over economic policy and the Conservative leadership would dominate the 1903–1905 period.

The Restoration system had entered a phase of decline following the national trauma from the Spanish–American War (the "1898 disaster") and the absence of politically authoritative figureheads since the deaths of Antonio Cánovas del Castillo (1897) and Práxedes Mateo Sagasta (1903), weakening the internal unity of both dynastic parties and strengthening the position of faction leaders and local caciques as power brokers. Concurrently, the anti-monarchist opposition became increasingly competitive in urban and some rural districts, partly due to the introduction of universal suffrage since 1890, partly due to the progressive weakening of the pro-government electoral apparatus.

Francisco Silvela's return to power in December 1902 had seen the incorporation of the remaining Gamacists under Antonio Maura—a strong adherent to Silvela's regenerationist view of a revolution from power"—into the Conservative fold, with Maura himself being appointed as new governance minister. The rivalry within Silvela's cabinet between Maura (whose position was more flexible in favour of corporatism and social reforms, even through deficit spending) and Raimundo Fernández-Villaverde (proponent of a rigid orthodox economic policy based on fiscal discipline and the gold standard) led to the latter's resignation as finance minister in March 1903.

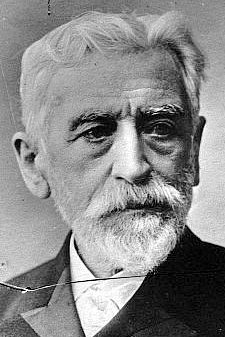
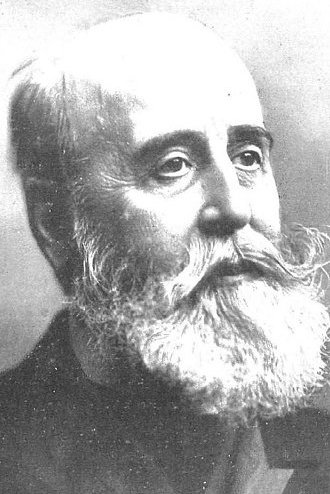
A push by Segismundo Moret (right) for the Liberal leadership led to a party schism with Eugenio Montero Ríos (left).

Villaverde and Maura's financial clashes over a cabinet-sponsored Navy Law, coupled with disagreements between the Crown and Maura over election preparation procedures—as a result of the strong performance of anti-monarchist candidates in the cities of Madrid, Barcelona and Valencia in the 1903 general election—led to Silvela's resignation on 20 July 1903, with young King Alfonso XIII appointing Villaverde as new prime minister. This situation would last for only five months, as most of the Conservatives coalesced around Maura (singled out by Silvela as his successor) after a vigorous parliamentary speech in defense of Conservative ideals on 11 November, prompting the downfall of Villaverde's government when it proved unable to get its 1904 budget bill through parliament in December.

A new government under Antonio Maura saw attempts to implement a regenerationist agenda, but his policy of increasing public spending caused a rift with the Villaverdists within the Conservative Party. During this period, the government had to deal with the "Nozaleda affair": its attempt to propose Bernardino Nozaleda—former archbishop of Manila, questioned for his role during the loss of the Philippines—as archbishop of Valencia, earning Maura criticism from the opposition. Maura resigned on 16 December 1904, following the King's refusal to sign the appointment of General Francisco Loño to the newly created post of Chief of the Central Staff of the Army—with Alfonso XIII preferring General Camilo García de Polavieja instead—sparking a political crisis as no other Conservative leader could command the party's parliamentary support: an interim cabinet by Marcelo Azcárraga fell within one month over disagreements on the date of re-opening of the Cortes, and a second government under Villaverde was left in a clear minority, surviving only for as long as the parliament remained closed. Once the Cortes were re-opened, the government suffered a string of parliamentary defeats until it was brought down in a vote of confidence on 20 June 1905. Both Silvela and Villaverde would die within a few weeks of each other in 1905, leaving Maura as the sole undisputed leader of the Conservative Party.

Sagasta's death had left the Liberal Party in need of a new leader and political direction. In a parliamentary assembly held on 15 November 1903, Eugenio Montero Ríos narrowly outvoted Segismundo Moret among party legislators (210 to 194), but fell short of the two-thirds majority required for election. The party split into two factions, with Montero Ríos being joined by José López Domínguez and José Canalejas—who had left both the Liberal government and party the previous year over his disagreement with Moret and Sagasta's deal with the Holy See on the issue of religious orders—into the new Liberal Democratic Party. In June 1905, amid the crisis of the Conservative government (seeing five cabinets succeeding each other within two years), Montero Ríos and Moret agreed on a united front to pose a viable political alternative, which bore fruit upon the former's appointment as prime minister on 23 June.

== Overview ==
Under the 1876 Constitution, the Spanish Cortes were conceived as "co-legislative bodies", forming a nearly perfect bicameral system. Both the Congress of Deputies and the Senate exercised legislative, oversight and budgetary functions, sharing almost equal powers, except in budget laws (taxation and public credit)—whose first reading corresponded to Congress—and in impeachment processes against government ministers, where Congress handled indictment and the Senate the trial.

=== Date ===
The term of each chamber of the Cortes—the Congress and one-half of the elective part of the Senate—expired five years from the date of their previous election, unless they were dissolved earlier. The previous elections were held on 26 April 1903 for the Congress and on 10 May 1903 for the Senate, which meant that the chambers' terms would have expired on 26 April and 10 May 1908, respectively.

The monarch had the prerogative to dissolve both chambers at any given time—either jointly or separately—and call a snap election. There was no constitutional requirement for concurrent elections to the Congress and the Senate, nor for the elective part of the Senate to be renewed in its entirety except in the case that a full dissolution was agreed by the monarch. Still, there was only one case of a separate election (for the Senate in 1877) and no half-Senate elections taking place under the 1876 Constitution.

The Cortes were officially dissolved on 17 August 1905, with the corresponding decree setting election day for 10 September (Congress) and 24 September 1905 (Senate) and scheduling for both chambers to reconvene on 11 October.

=== Electoral system ===
Voting for the Congress of Deputies was based on universal manhood suffrage, comprising all Spanish national males over 25 years of age with full civil rights, provided they had two years of residence in a Spanish municipality and were not enlisted ranks in active duty. Additional restrictions excluded those deprived of political rights or barred from public office by a final sentence, criminally imprisoned or convicted, legally incapacitated, bankrupt, public debtors, and homeless.

The Congress of Deputies had one seat per 50,000 inhabitants. Of these, those corresponding to larger urban areas were elected in multi-member constituencies using partial block voting: voters in constituencies electing eight seats or more could choose up to three candidates less than the number of seats at stake; in those with between four and eight seats, up to two less; and in those with between one and four seats, up to one less. The remaining seats were elected in single-member districts by plurality voting and distributed among the provinces of Spain according to population. Additionally, universities, economic societies of Friends of the Country and officially organized chambers of commerce, industry and agriculture, had one seat per 5,000 registered voters.

As a result of the aforementioned allocation, 306 single-member districts were established, and each Congress multi-member constituency (a total of 28, electing 98 seats) was entitled the following seats:

Seats	Constituencies
8	Madrid
7	Barcelona
5	Palma, Seville
4	Cartagena
3	Alicante, Almería, Badajoz, Burgos, Cádiz, Córdoba, Granada, Huelva, Jaén, Jerez de la Frontera, La Coruña, Las Palmas^{(+2)}, Lugo, Málaga, Murcia, Oviedo, Pamplona, Santa Cruz de Tenerife, Santander, Tarragona, Valencia, Valladolid, Zaragoza

Voting for the elective part of the Senate was based on censitary suffrage, comprising Spanish male householders of voting age, residing in a Spanish municipality, with full political and civil rights, who met either of the following:

- Being qualified electors (such as archbishops, bishops and cathedral chapter members, in the archdioceses; full academics, in the royal academies; university authorities and professors, in the universities; or provincial deputies);
- Being elected as delegates (either by members with three years of seniority (in the economic societies of Friends of the Country; or by major taxpayers for direct taxes and local authorities, in the local councils).

180 Senate seats were elected using indirect, two-round majority voting. Delegates chosen by local councils—each of which was assigned an initial minimum of one delegate, with one additional delegate for every six councillors—voted for senators together with provincial deputies. The provinces of Barcelona, Madrid and Valencia were allocated four seats each, and the rest three each, for a total of 150. The remaining 30 seats were allocated to special institutional districts (one each), including major archdioceses, royal academies, universities, and economic societies, (Note: The following were considered as the major districts in each category: Archdioceses: Burgos, Granada, Santiago de Compostela, Seville, Tarragona, Toledo, Valencia, Valladolid, and Zaragoza.; Royal academies: Spanish; History; Fine Arts of San Fernando; Exact, Physical and Natural Sciences; Moral and Political Sciences; and Medicine.; Universities: Madrid, Barcelona, Granada, Oviedo, Salamanca, Santiago, Seville, Valencia, Valladolid, and Zaragoza.; Economic societies of Friends of the Country: Madrid, Barcelona, León, Seville, and Valencia.) each elected by their own qualified electors or delegates. Another 180 seats consisted of senators in their own right (such as the monarch's offspring and the heir apparent once coming of age (16), grandees of Spain with an income of Pts 60,000, certain general officers—captain generals and admirals—the Patriarch of the Indies and archbishops, and the heads of higher courts and state institutions (Note: These comprised the Council of State, the Supreme Court, the Court of Auditors and the Supreme Council of War and Navy.) after two years of service), as well as senators for life directly appointed by the monarch.

The law provided for by-elections to fill vacant seats during the legislative term. At least two vacancies were required to trigger a by-election in Congress multi-member constituencies.

== Candidates ==
=== Nomination rules ===
For the Congress, secular Spanish males of voting age, with full civil rights, could run for election. Causes of ineligibility applied to those excluded from voting or meeting any of the incompatibility rules for deputies, as well as to:

- Public contractors, within their relevant territories;
- Holders of a number of territorial posts (such as government-appointed positions, not including government ministers and Central Administration employees; local and provincial employees; and provincial deputation members), within their areas of jurisdiction, during their term of office and up to one year afterwards.

For the Senate, eligibility was limited to Spanish males over 35 years of age not under criminal prosecution, disfranchisement nor asset seizure, and who either qualified as senators in their own right or belonged (or had belonged) to certain categories:

- Provided an income of Pts 7,500: the presidents of the Senate and the Congress; deputies serving in three different congresses or eight terms; government ministers; bishops; grandees of Spain not eligible as senators in their own right; and various senior officials after two years of service (such as certain general officers—lieutenant generals and vice admirals—and members of higher courts and state institutions); heads of diplomatic missions abroad (ambassadors after two years, and plenipotentiaries after four); heads and full academics in the royal academies; chief engineers; and full professors with four years of service;
- Provided an income of Pts 20,000 or being taxpayers with a minimum quota of Pts 4,000 in direct taxes (paid two years in advance): Spanish nobility; and former deputies, provincial deputies or mayors in provincial capitals or towns over 20,000;
- Having served as senators before the promulgation of the 1876 Constitution.

Other ineligibility provisions for the Senate also applied to a number of territorial officials within their areas of jurisdiction, during their term of office and up to three months afterwards; public contractors; tax collectors; and public debtors.

Incompatibility rules barred representing multiple constituencies simultaneously, as well as combining:

- The role of senator with other legislative roles (deputy, senator and local councillor, except those in Madrid; and provincial deputies within their respective provinces); or with any public post not explicitly permitted under Senate eligibility requirements;
- The role of deputy with any other civil, military or judicial post, with exceptions—and as many as 40 deputies allowed to simultaneously benefit from these—including a number of specific posts based in Madrid, such as any of the aforementioned ones (provided a public salary of Pts 12,500); senior court officials; university authorities and professors; chief engineers; and general officers.

== Results ==
=== Congress of Deputies ===
← Summary of the 10 September 1905 Congress of Deputies election results →
Parties and alliances	Popular vote		Seats
Parties and alliances	Votes	%	Seats
Liberal Party–Liberal Democratic Party (PL–PLD)			226
Conservative Party (PC)			105
Republican Union (UR)			25
Villaverdist Conservatives (V)			16
Liberal Reformist Party (PLR)			7
Regionalist League (LR)			7
Federal Republican Party (PRF)			5
Traditionalist Communion (Carlist) (CT)			4
Integrist Party (PI)			3
Independents (INDEP)			6
Total			404
Votes cast / turnout			
Abstentions			
Registered voters			

Seats
PL–PLD	55.94%
PC	25.99%
UR	6.19%
V	3.96%
PLR	1.73%
LR	1.73%
PRF	1.24%
CT	0.99%
PI	0.74%
INDEP	1.49%

=== Senate ===
← Summary of the 24 September 1905 Senate of Spain election results →
Parties and alliances	Seats
Liberal Party–Liberal Democratic Party (PL–PLD)	109
Conservative Party (PC)	47
Villaverdist Conservatives (V)	4
Traditionalist Communion (Carlist) (CT)	2
Regionalist League (LR)	2
Republican Union (UR)	1
Liberal Reformist Party (PLR)	1
Federal Republican Party (PRF)	1
Independents (INDEP)	4
Archbishops (ARCH)	9
Total elective seats	180

Seats
PL–PLD	60.00%
PC	26.67%
V	2.22%
CT	1.11%
LR	1.11%
UR	0.56%
PLR	0.56%
PRF	0.56%
INDEP	2.22%
ARCH	5.00%

=== Distribution by group ===
Summary of political group distribution in the 12th Restoration Cortes (1905–1907)
Group	Parties and alliances	C	S	Total
PL–PLD	Liberal Party–Liberal Democratic Party (PL–PLD)	225	107	334
PL–PLD	Basque Dynastics (Urquijist) (DV)	1	1	334
PC	Conservative Party (PC)	105	48	153
UR	Republican Union (UR)	25	1	26
V	Villaverdist Conservatives (V)	16	4	20
LR	Regionalist League (LR)	7	2	9
PLR	Liberal Reformist Party (PLR)	7	1	8
PRF	Federal Republican Party (PRF)	5	1	6
CT	Traditionalist Communion (Carlist) (CT)	4	2	6
PI	Integrist Party (PI)	3	0	3
INDEP	Independents (INDEP)	5	4	10
INDEP	Independent Catholics (CAT)	1	0	10
ARCH	Archbishops (ARCH)	0	9	9
Total		404	180	584

== See also ==
- Encasillado

== Bibliography ==
Legislation

- Ley mandando que los distritos para las elecciones de Diputados a Cortes sean los que se expresan en la división adjunta (PDF) (Law). Madrid Gazette (in Spanish). 1 January 1871.
- Constitución de la Monarquía Española (PDF) (Constitution). Madrid Gazette (in Spanish). 30 June 1876.
- Ley electoral de Senadores (PDF) (Law). Madrid Gazette (in Spanish). 8 February 1877.
- Ley electoral de los Diputados a Cortes (PDF) (Law). Madrid Gazette (in Spanish). 28 December 1878.
- Ley enumerando los empleos con los cuales es compatible el cargo de Diputado a Cortes (PDF) (Law). Madrid Gazette (in Spanish). 7 March 1880.
- Ley dividiendo la provincia de Guipúzcoa en distritos para la elección de Diputados a Cortes (PDF) (Law). Madrid Gazette (in Spanish). 23 June 1885.
- Ley dividiendo el distrito electoral de Tarrasa en dos, que se denominarán de Tarrasa y de Sabadell (PDF) (Law). Madrid Gazette (in Spanish). 18 January 1887.
- Ley reformando el art. 4º. de la ley de Incompatibilidades (PDF) (Law). Madrid Gazette (in Spanish). 31 July 1887.
- Ley fijando la división de la provincia de Álava en distritos electorales para Diputados a Cortes (PDF) (Law). Madrid Gazette (in Spanish). 10 July 1888.
- Ley electoral para Diputados a Cortes (PDF) (Law). Madrid Gazette (in Spanish). 26 June 1890.
- Ley disponiendo que las primeras y sucesivas elecciones que se verifiquen en la provincia de Zamora se dividirá en siete distritos en la forma que se expresa (PDF) (Law). Madrid Gazette (in Spanish). 18 June 1895.
- Leyes aprobando la división electoral de las provincias de León y Vizcaya (PDF) (Law). Madrid Gazette (in Spanish). 2 August 1895.
- Leyes aprobando la división electoral en las provincias de Sevilla y de Barcelona (PDF) (Law). Madrid Gazette (in Spanish). 5 July 1898.
- Real decreto disponiendo el número de Senadores que han de elegir las provincias que se citan (PDF) (Royal Decree). Madrid Gazette (in Spanish). 16 March 1899.
- Ley mandando que en lo sucesivo sean cuatro los Diputados a Cortes que elegirá la circunscripción electoral de Cartagena (PDF) (Law). Madrid Gazette (in Spanish). 7 August 1899.
- Ley estableciendo una circunscripción para elegir tres Diputados a Cortes, que la constituirán los cuatro partidos judiciales de Ayamonte, Hueva, Moguer y la Palma, con todas las poblaciones que de ellos forman parte (PDF) (Law). Madrid Gazette (in Spanish). 24 March 1902.
- Ley sancionada por S. M. formando un solo distrito electoral para Diputados a Cortes con los de Las Palmas y Guía (PDF) (Law). Madrid Gazette (in Spanish). 5 April 1904.
- Real decreto declarando disuelto el Congreso de los Diputados y la parte electiva del Senado, y disponiendo que las Cortes se reúnan en Madrid el día 11 de Octubre próximo (PDF) (Royal Decree). Madrid Gazette (in Spanish). 17 August 1905.

Other

- Soldevilla, Fernando (1903). El Año Político 1902 (in Spanish). Madrid: National Library of Spain.
- Soldevilla, Fernando (1904). El Año Político 1903 (in Spanish). Madrid: National Library of Spain.
- Soldevilla, Fernando (1905). El Año Político 1904 (in Spanish). Madrid: National Library of Spain.
- Soldevilla, Fernando (1906). El Año Político 1905 (in Spanish). Madrid: National Library of Spain.
- Fernández Almagro, Melchor (1943). "Las Cortes del siglo XIX y la práctica electoral" (PDF). Revista de Estudios Políticos (in Spanish) (9–10). Madrid: Centre for Political and Constitutional Studies: 383–419. ISSN 0048-7694.
- Calero, Antonio María (1987). "La prerrogativa regia en la Restauración: teoría y práctica (1875-1902)" (PDF). Revista de Estudios Políticos (in Spanish) (55). Madrid: Centre for Political and Constitutional Studies: 273–315. ISSN 0048-7694.
- Ortega Álvarez, Luis; Santaolaya Machetti, Pablo (1996). "Evolución histórica del sistema electoral español". Revista de las Cortes Generales (in Spanish). 37. Cortes Generales: 65–107. doi:10.33426/rcg/1996/37/784. ISSN 0213-0130.
- Martorell Linares, Miguel Ángel (1997). "La crisis parlamentaria de 1913-1917. La quiebra del sistema de relaciones parlamentarias de la Restauración" (PDF). Revista de Estudios Políticos (in Spanish) (96). Madrid: Centre for Political and Constitutional Studies: 137–161. ISSN 0048-7694.
- Martínez Ruiz, Enrique; Maqueda Abreu, Consuelo; De Diego, Emilio (1999). Atlas histórico de España. El Reinado de Alfonso XIII (1902-1931) (in Spanish). Vol. 2. Bilbao: Ediciones KAL. pp. 121–132. ISBN 9788470903502.
- Armengol i Segú, Josep; Varela Ortega, José (2001). El poder de la influencia: geografía del caciquismo en España (1875-1923) (in Spanish). Madrid: Marcial Pons. pp. 655–776. ISBN 9788425911521.
- Comín Comín, Francisco (2002). "Raimundo Fernández Villaverde: un ministro de Hacienda ejemplar" (PDF). Anales de la Real Academia de Ciencias Morales y Políticas (in Spanish). 1. Royal Academy of Moral and Political Sciences: 637–675. ISSN 0210-4121.
- García Muñoz, Montserrat (2002). "La documentación electoral y el fichero histórico de diputados". Revista General de Información y Documentación (in Spanish). 12 (1): 93–137. ISSN 1132-1873.
- Carreras de Odriozola, Albert; Tafunell Sambola, Xavier (2005) [1989]. Estadísticas históricas de España, siglos XIX-XX (PDF) (in Spanish). Vol. 1 (II ed.). Bilbao: Fundación BBVA. pp. 1072–1097. ISBN 84-96515-00-1. Archived from the original (PDF) on 24 September 2015.
- Martínez Relanzón, Alejandro (2017). "Political Modernization in Spain Between 1876 and 1923". Annales Universitatis Mariae Curie-Skłodowska, Sectio K. 24 (1). Madrid: Maria Curie-Skłodowska University: 145–154. doi:10.17951/k.2017.24.1.145. S2CID 159328027.
- Serrano Lahoz, Manuel (2020). Los partidos republicanos durante la Restauración (1874-1931) (PDF) (BA thesis) (in Spanish). University of Zaragoza.
- Royal Academy of History (2022). "Historia Hispánica". Historia Hispánica (in Spanish).
