= 1898 Spanish general election =

- 27 March 1898 (Congress); 10 April 1898 (Senate) (Note: The Senate election in the province of Canaries was postponed to 12 April 1898.)

All 447 seats in the Congress of Deputies and 180 (of 360) seats in the Senate 224 seats needed for a majority in the Congress of Deputies
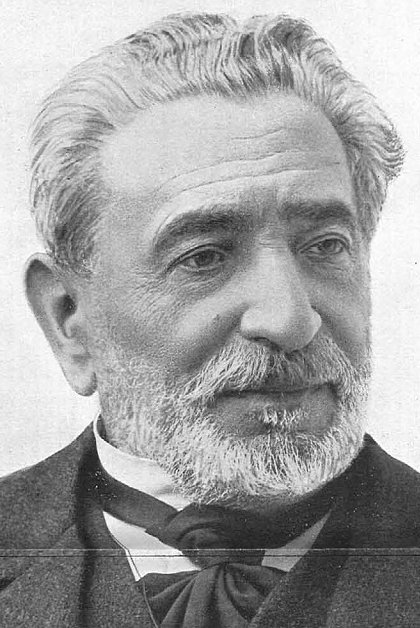

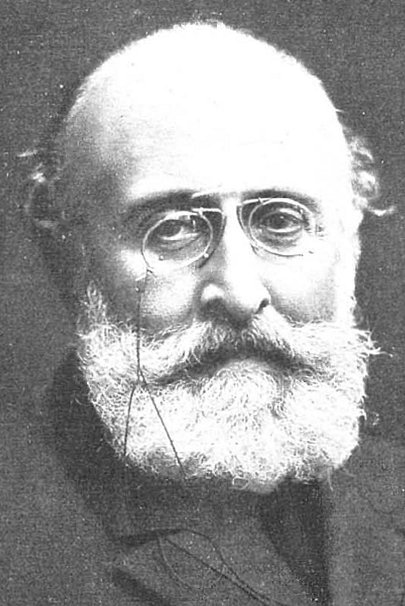

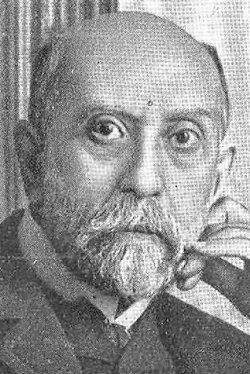

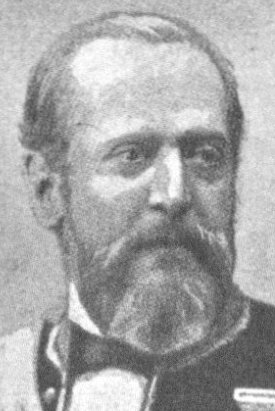

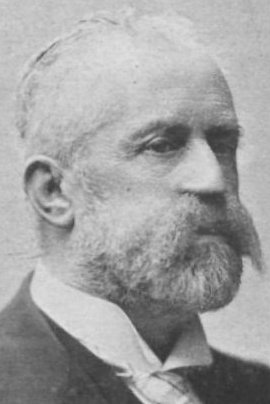

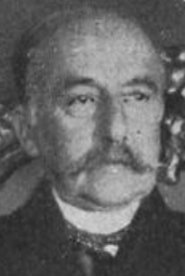
| | First party | Second party | Third party |
|---|---|---|---|
| Leader | Práxedes Mateo Sagasta | Francisco Silvela | Nicolás Salmerón |
| Party | Liberal | Conservative (Silvelist) | Republican |
| Leader since | 1880 | 1892 | 1898 |
| Leader's seat | Logroño | Piedrahíta | Gracia |
| Last election | 111 D · 43 S | 12 D · 2 S | 4 D · 3 S |
| Seats won | 324 D · 121 S | 79 D · 36 S | 15 D · 1 S |
| Seat change | ▲213 D · ▲78 S | ▲65 D · ▲34 S | ▲11 D · ▼2 S |
| | Fourth party | Fifth party | Sixth party |
| Leader | Carlos O'Donnell | Francisco Romero Robledo | Enrique de Aguilera y Gamboa |
| Party | Tetuanist | Liberal Reformist | Carlist |
| Leader since | 1898 | 1898 | 1891 |
| Leader's seat | Senator (for life) | Antequera | — |
| Last election | 307 D · 117 S (Note: Results for PLC in the 1896 election.) | Did not contest | 10 D · 2 S |
| Seats won | 7 D · 7 S | 6 D · 1 S | 6 D · 0 S |
| Seat change | ▼300 D · ▼110 S | ▲6 D · ▲1 S | ▼4 D · ▼2 S |
- Election results by constituency (Congress)
Prime Minister before election
Práxedes Mateo Sagasta
Liberal
Prime Minister after election
Práxedes Mateo Sagasta
Liberal

A general election was held in Spain on 27 March 1898 (for the Congress of Deputies), and on 10 April 1898 (for the Senate), to elect the members of the 8th Cortes under the Spanish Constitution of 1876, during the Restoration period. All 445 seats in the Congress of Deputies—plus two special districts—were up for election, as well as 180 of 360 seats in the Senate.

Since the Pact of El Pardo, an informal system known as turno or turnismo was operated by the monarchy of Spain and the country's two main parties—the Conservatives and the Liberals—to determine in advance the outcome of elections by means of electoral fraud, often achieved through the territorial clientelistic networks of local bosses (the caciques), ensuring that both parties would have rotating periods in power. As a result, elections were often neither truly free nor fair, though they could be more competitive in the country's urban centres where caciquism was weaker.

The election was called amid a period of political instability, following the assassination in August 1897 of Prime Minister Antonio Cánovas del Castillo by Italian anarchist Michele Angiolillo, and the brief premiership of Marcelo Azcárraga. Respecting the turno system, Queen Regent Maria Christina appointed a new government under Liberal leader Práxedes Mateo Sagasta on 4 October 1897, tasking them with the formation of a new majority. In the wake of Cánovas's death, the Conservative Party was left in disarray, split between Francisco Silvela's Conservative Union, a faction led by Carlos O'Donnell, Duke of Tetuán, and Francisco Romero Robledo's re-established Liberal Reformist Party. The result of the election was a Liberal majority in both chambers.

This would be the last Spanish general election to be held in Cuba and Puerto Rico, as the Spanish–American War, which would start only a few weeks after the election, would lead to the loss of all Spanish colonies in the Caribbean and the Pacific.

== Background ==
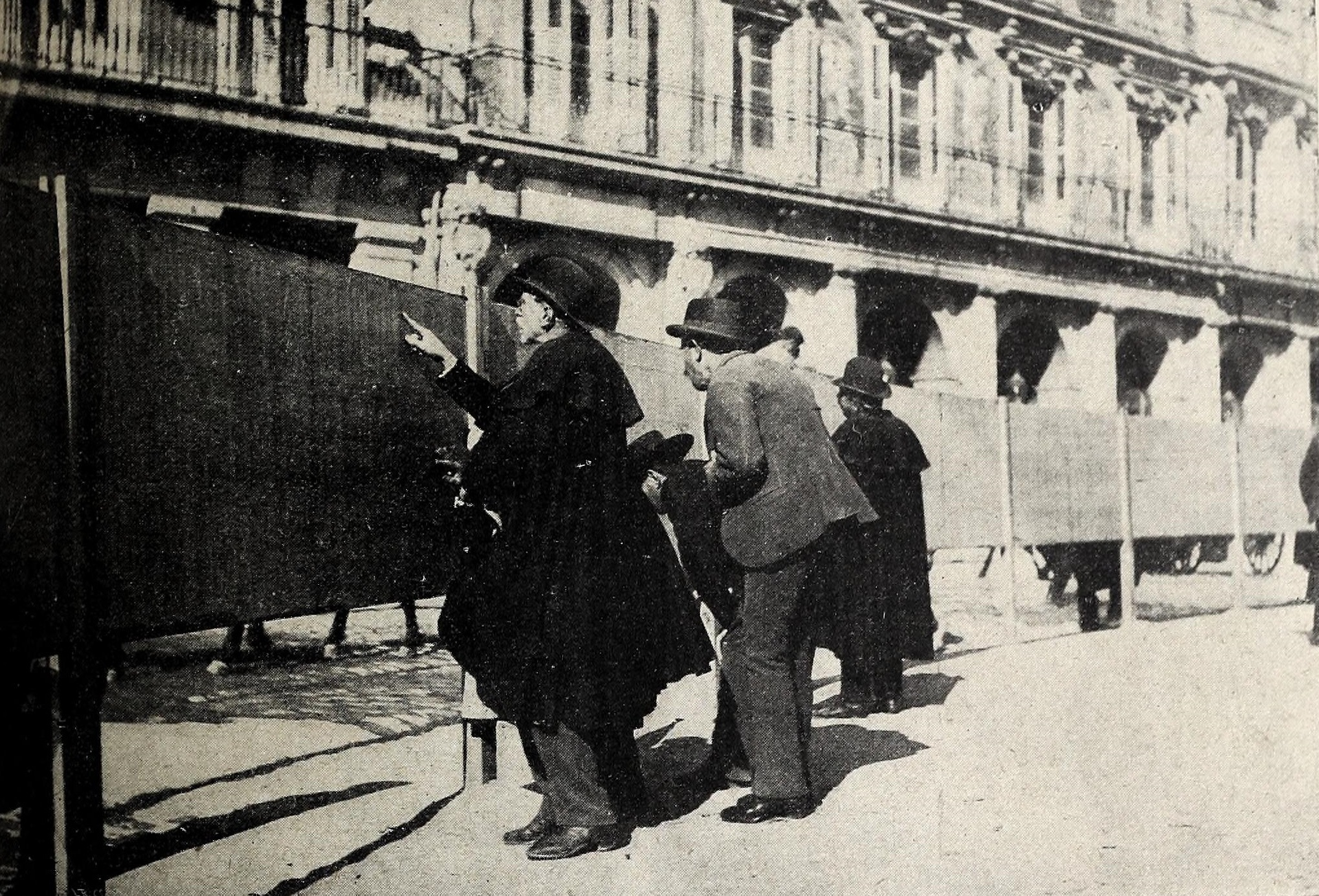
Public exhibition of the electoral rolls at the Plaza Mayor in Madrid

Following the Bourbon Restoration in 1874, the Spanish Constitution of 1876 enshrined Spain as a semi-constitutional monarchy, awarding the monarch—under the royal prerogative—the right of legislative initiative together with the bicameral Cortes; the capacity to veto laws passed by the legislative body; the power to appoint government members (including the prime minister); the ability to grant or deny parliamentary dissolution, the adjournment of legislative sessions and the signature of royal decrees; as well as the title of commander-in-chief of the armed forces. The monarch would play a key role in the turno system by appointing and dismissing governments, which would then organize elections to provide themselves with a parliamentary majority. This informal system allowed the two major "dynastic" political parties at the time, the Conservatives and the Liberals—characterized as oligarchic, elite parties with loose structures dominated by internal factions, each led by powerful individuals—to alternate in power by means of electoral fraud (pucherazo). This was achieved by assigning candidates to districts before the elections were held (encasillado), then arrange their victory through the links between the Ministry of Governance and the territorial clientelistic networks of provincial governors and local bosses (the caciques), excluding minor parties from the power sharing.

The last government of Antonio Cánovas del Castillo (1895–1897) had seen an increase in anarchist activity, with the Barcelona Corpus Christi procession bombing on 7 June 1896 and its consequences dominating the political landscape. Those suspect and arrested for the bombing were tried in the military Montjuïc Castle (the Montjuïc trials), amid accusations of forced confessions through torture. A new anti-terrorist law was approved that year and applied retroactively against the acquitted prisoners, who were deported out of the country. Cánovas's role in the trials and the political repression following the bombings would ultimately lead to his assassination on 8 August 1897 by anarchist Michele Angiolillo. This period also saw the breakout of the Philippine Revolution in August 1896.

Following Cánovas's death, Marcelo Azcárraga took the role of prime minister in the interim until power was handed by Queen Regent Maria Christina to Práxedes Mateo Sagasta and his Liberal Party in October that year. This episode threw the Conservative Party into disarray: most party members acknowledged Francisco Silvela as new leader and joined his Conservative Union; others—considering themselves as the true heirs of Cánovas's ideas—joined the Duke of Tetuán's faction; finally, Francisco Romero Robledo re-established his Liberal Reformist Party and broke away in opposition to Silvela's leadership.

== Overview ==
Under the 1876 Constitution, the Spanish Cortes were conceived as "co-legislative bodies", forming a nearly perfect bicameral system. Both the Congress of Deputies and the Senate exercised legislative, oversight and budgetary functions, sharing almost equal powers, except in budget laws (taxation and public credit)—whose first reading corresponded to Congress—and in impeachment processes against government ministers, where Congress handled indictment and the Senate the trial.

=== Date ===
The term of each chamber of the Cortes—the Congress and one-half of the elective part of the Senate—expired five years from the date of their previous election, unless they were dissolved earlier. The previous elections were held on 12 April 1896 for the Congress and on 26 April 1896 for the Senate, which meant that the chambers' terms would have expired on 12 and 26 April 1901, respectively.

The monarch had the prerogative to dissolve both chambers at any given time—either jointly or separately—and call a snap election. There was no constitutional requirement for concurrent elections to the Congress and the Senate, nor for the elective part of the Senate to be renewed in its entirety except in the case that a full dissolution was agreed by the monarch. Still, there was only one case of a separate election (for the Senate in 1877) and no half-Senate elections taking place under the 1876 Constitution.

The Cortes were officially dissolved on 26 February 1898, with the corresponding decree setting election day for 27 March (Congress) and 10 April 1898 (Senate) and scheduling for both chambers to reconvene on 25 April.

=== Electoral system ===
Voting for the Congress of Deputies was based on universal manhood suffrage, comprising all Spanish national males over 25 years of age with full civil rights, provided they had two years of residence in a Spanish municipality and were not enlisted ranks in active duty. Amendments in 1897 extended universal manhood suffrage to the Spanish West Indies (Cuba and Puerto Rico). Additional restrictions excluded those deprived of political rights or barred from public office by a final sentence, criminally imprisoned or convicted, legally incapacitated, bankrupt, public debtors, and homeless.

The Congress of Deputies had one seat per 50,000 inhabitants. Of these, those corresponding to larger urban areas were elected in multi-member constituencies using partial block voting: voters in constituencies electing eight seats or more could choose up to three candidates less than the number of seats at stake; in those with between four and eight seats, up to two less; and in those with between one and four seats, up to one less. The remaining seats were elected in single-member districts by plurality voting and distributed among the provinces of Spain according to population. Additionally, universities, economic societies of Friends of the Country and officially organized chambers of commerce, industry and agriculture, had one seat per 5,000 registered voters. Cuba and Puerto Rico were allocated 30 and 16 seats, respectively.

As a result of the aforementioned allocation, 331 single-member districts (including two special districts) were established, and each Congress multi-member constituency (a total of 34, electing 116 seats) was entitled the following seats:

| Seats | Constituencies |
|---|---|
| 8 | Madrid |
| 6 | Havana |
| 5 | Barcelona, Palma |
| 4 | Santa Clara, Seville |
| 3 | Alicante, Almería, Badajoz, Burgos, Cádiz, Cartagena, Córdoba, Granada, Jaén, Jerez de la Frontera, La Coruña, Lugo, Málaga, Matanzas, Mayagüez, Murcia, Oviedo, Pamplona, Pinar del Río, Ponce, San Juan Bautista, Santa Cruz de Tenerife, Santander, Santiago de Cuba, Tarragona, Valencia, Valladolid, Zaragoza |

Voting for the elective part of the Senate was based on censitary suffrage, comprising Spanish male householders of voting age, residing in a Spanish municipality, with full political and civil rights, who met either of the following:

- Being qualified electors (such as archbishops, bishops and cathedral chapter members, in the archdioceses; full academics, in the royal academies; university authorities and professors, in the universities; or provincial deputies);
- Being elected as delegates (either by members with three years of seniority (in the economic societies of Friends of the Country; or by major taxpayers for direct taxes and local authorities, in the local councils).

180 Senate seats were elected using indirect, two-round majority voting. Delegates chosen by local councils—each of which was assigned an initial minimum of one delegate, with one additional delegate for every six councillors—voted for senators together with provincial deputies. The provinces of Álava, Albacete, Ávila, Biscay, Cuenca, Guadalajara, Guipúzcoa, Huelva, Logroño, Matanzas, Palencia, Pinar del Río, Puerto Príncipe, Santa Clara, Santander, Santiago de Cuba, Segovia, Soria, Teruel, Valladolid and Zamora were allocated two seats each, and the rest three each, for a total of 147. The remaining 33 seats were allocated to special institutional districts (one each), including major archdioceses, royal academies, universities, and economic societies, (Note: The following were considered as the major districts in each category: Archdioceses: Burgos, Granada, Santiago de Compostela, Santiago de Cuba, Seville, Tarragona, Toledo, Valencia, Valladolid, and Zaragoza.; Royal academies: Spanish; History; Fine Arts of San Fernando; Exact, Physical and Natural Sciences; Moral and Political Sciences; and Medicine.; Universities: Madrid, Barcelona, Granada, Havana, Oviedo, Salamanca, Santiago, Seville, Valencia, Valladolid, and Zaragoza.; Economic societies of Friends of the Country: Madrid, Barcelona, Havana–Puerto Rico, León, Seville, and Valencia.) each elected by their own qualified electors or delegates. Another 180 seats consisted of senators in their own right (such as the monarch's offspring and the heir apparent once coming of age (16), grandees of Spain with an income of Pts 60,000, certain general officers—captain generals and admirals—the Patriarch of the Indies and archbishops, and the heads of higher courts and state institutions (Note: These comprised the Council of State, the Supreme Court, the Court of Auditors and the Supreme Council of War and Navy.) after two years of service), as well as senators for life directly appointed by the monarch.

The law provided for by-elections to fill vacant seats during the legislative term. At least two vacancies were required to trigger a by-election in Congress multi-member constituencies.

== Candidates ==
=== Nomination rules ===
For the Congress, secular Spanish males of voting age, with full civil rights, could run for election. Causes of ineligibility applied to those excluded from voting or meeting any of the incompatibility rules for deputies, as well as to:

- Public contractors, within their relevant territories;
- Holders of a number of territorial posts (such as government-appointed positions, not including government ministers and Central Administration employees; local and provincial employees; and provincial deputation members), within their areas of jurisdiction, during their term of office and up to one year afterwards.

For the Senate, eligibility was limited to Spanish males over 35 years of age not under criminal prosecution, disfranchisement nor asset seizure, and who either qualified as senators in their own right or belonged (or had belonged) to certain categories:

- Provided an income of Pts 7,500: the presidents of the Senate and the Congress; deputies serving in three different congresses or eight terms; government ministers; bishops; grandees of Spain not eligible as senators in their own right; and various senior officials after two years of service (such as certain general officers—lieutenant generals and vice admirals—and members of higher courts and state institutions); heads of diplomatic missions abroad (ambassadors after two years, and plenipotentiaries after four); heads and full academics in the royal academies; chief engineers; and full professors with four years of service;
- Provided an income of Pts 20,000 or being taxpayers with a minimum quota of Pts 4,000 in direct taxes (paid two years in advance): Spanish nobility; and former deputies, provincial deputies or mayors in provincial capitals or towns over 20,000;
- Having served as senators before the promulgation of the 1876 Constitution.

Other ineligibility provisions for the Senate also applied to a number of territorial officials within their areas of jurisdiction, during their term of office and up to three months afterwards; public contractors; tax collectors; and public debtors.

Incompatibility rules barred representing multiple constituencies simultaneously, as well as combining:

- The role of senator with other legislative roles (deputy, senator and local councillor, except those in Madrid; and provincial deputies within their respective provinces); or with any public post not explicitly permitted under Senate eligibility requirements;
- The role of deputy with any other civil, military or judicial post, with exceptions—and as many as 40 deputies allowed to simultaneously benefit from these—including a number of specific posts based in Madrid, such as any of the aforementioned ones (provided a public salary of Pts 12,500); senior court officials; university authorities and professors; chief engineers; and general officers.

== Results ==
=== Congress of Deputies ===
← Summary of the 27 March 1898 Congress of Deputies election results →
| Parties and alliances | Popular vote | | Seats |
| Parties and alliances | Votes | % | Seats |
|---|---|---|---|
| Liberal Party (PL) | | | 324 |
| Conservative Union (UC) | | | 79 |
| Republican Fusion (FR) | | | 15 |
| Tetuanist Conservatives (T) | | | 7 |
| Liberal Reformist Party (PLR) | | | 6 |
| Traditionalist Communion (Carlist) (CT) | | | 6 |
| Independents (INDEP) | | | 10 |
| Total | | | 447 |
| Votes cast / turnout | | | |
| Abstentions | | | |
| Registered voters | | | |

Seats
| PL | 72.48% |
| UC | 17.67% |
| FR | 3.36% |
| T | 1.57% |
| PLR | 1.34% |
| CT | 1.34% |
| INDEP | 2.24% |

=== Senate ===
← Summary of the 10 April 1898 Senate of Spain election results →
| Parties and alliances | Seats |
|---|---|
| Liberal Party (PL) | 121 |
| Conservative Union (UC) | 36 |
| Tetuanist Conservatives (T) | 7 |
| Republican Fusion (FR) | 1 |
| Liberal Reformist Party (PLR) | 1 |
| Integrist Party (PI) | 1 |
| Independents (INDEP) | 3 |
| Archbishops (ARCH) | 10 |
| Total elective seats | 180 |

Seats
| PL | 67.22% |
| UC | 20.00% |
| T | 3.89% |
| FR | 0.56% |
| PLR | 0.56% |
| PI | 0.56% |
| INDEP | 1.67% |
| ARCH | 5.56% |

=== Maps ===
Election results by constituency (Congress).

=== Distribution by group ===
Summary of political group distribution in the 8th Restoration Cortes (1898–1899)
| Group | Parties and alliances | C | S | Total |
|---|---|---|---|---|
| PL | Liberal Party (PL) | 285 | 108 | 445 |
| PL | Autonomist Liberal Party (PLA) | 21 | 5 | 445 |
| PL | Unconditional Spanish Party (PIE) | 10 | 1 | 445 |
| PL | Puerto Rican Autonomist Party (PAP) | 6 | 1 | 445 |
| PL | Constitutional Union of Cuba (UCC) | 1 | 5 | 445 |
| PL | Basque Dynastics (Urquijist) (DV) | 1 | 1 | 445 |
| UC | Conservative Union (UC) | 74 | 33 | 115 |
| UC | Constitutional Union of Cuba (UCC) | 5 | 2 | 115 |
| UC | Unconditional Spanish Party (PIE) | 0 | 1 | 115 |
| FR | National Republican Party (PRN) | 9 | 1 | 16 |
| FR | Independent Possibilists (P.IND) | 3 | 0 | 16 |
| FR | Centralist Republican Party (PRC) | 2 | 0 | 16 |
| FR | Blasquist Republicans (RB) | 1 | 0 | 16 |
| T | Liberal Conservative Party (PLC) | 7 | 7 | 14 |
| PLR | Liberal Reformist Party (PLR) | 6 | 1 | 7 |
| CT | Traditionalist Communion (Carlist) (CT) | 6 | 0 | 6 |
| PI | Integrist Party (PI) | 0 | 1 | 1 |
| INDEP | Independents (INDEP) | 9 | 2 | 13 |
| INDEP | Independent Catholics (CAT) | 1 | 0 | 13 |
| INDEP | Basque Dynastics (Urquijist) (DV) | 0 | 1 | 13 |
| ARCH | Archbishops (ARCH) | 0 | 10 | 10 |
| Total | | 447 | 180 | 627 |

== See also ==
- 1898 Puerto Rican general election

== Bibliography ==
Legislation

- Ley mandando que los distritos para las elecciones de Diputados a Cortes sean los que se expresan en la división adjunta (PDF) (Law). Madrid Gazette (in Spanish). 1 January 1871.
- Constitución de la Monarquía Española (PDF) (Constitution). Madrid Gazette (in Spanish). 30 June 1876.
- Ley electoral de Senadores (PDF) (Law). Madrid Gazette (in Spanish). 8 February 1877.
- Ley electoral de los Diputados a Cortes (PDF) (Law). Madrid Gazette (in Spanish). 28 December 1878.
- Ley dictando reglas para la elección de Senadores en las islas de Cuba y Puerto Rico (PDF) (Law). Madrid Gazette (in Spanish). 9 January 1879.
- Ley enumerando los empleos con los cuales es compatible el cargo de Diputado a Cortes (PDF) (Law). Madrid Gazette (in Spanish). 7 March 1880.
- Real decreto determinando el número de Senadores que habrán de elegirse en cada una de las provincias con motivo de las próximas elecciones (PDF) (Royal Decree). Madrid Gazette (in Spanish). 30 June 1881.
- Ley dividiendo la provincia de Guipúzcoa en distritos para la elección de Diputados a Cortes (PDF) (Law). Madrid Gazette (in Spanish). 23 June 1885.
- Ley dividiendo el distrito electoral de Tarrasa en dos, que se denominarán de Tarrasa y de Sabadell (PDF) (Law). Madrid Gazette (in Spanish). 18 January 1887.
- Ley reformando el art. 4º. de la ley de Incompatibilidades (PDF) (Law). Madrid Gazette (in Spanish). 31 July 1887.
- Ley fijando la división de la provincia de Álava en distritos electorales para Diputados a Cortes (PDF) (Law). Madrid Gazette (in Spanish). 10 July 1888.
- Ley electoral para Diputados a Cortes (PDF) (Law). Madrid Gazette (in Spanish). 26 June 1890.
- Real decreto disponiendo que mientras no se publique nueva ley Electoral rija en la isla de Cuba la división en circunscripciones y distritos para la elección de Diputados a Cortes aprobada en el Congreso en la forma que se expresa (PDF) (Royal Decree). Madrid Gazette (in Spanish). 18 December 1890.
- Real decreto declarando subsistente la división territorial para elecciones de Diputados a Cortes en las islas de Cuba y Puerto Rico, establecida por Real decreto de 18 de Diciembre de 1890 (PDF) (Royal Decree). Madrid Gazette (in Spanish). 27 December 1892.
- Ley disponiendo que las primeras y sucesivas elecciones que se verifiquen en la provincia de Zamora se dividirá en siete distritos en la forma que se expresa (PDF) (Law). Madrid Gazette (in Spanish). 18 June 1895.
- Leyes aprobando la división electoral de las provincias de León y Vizcaya (PDF) (Law). Madrid Gazette (in Spanish). 2 August 1895.
- Ley Electoral de 26 de Junio de 1890. Adaptación para las Islas de Cuba y Puerto Rico (PDF) (Law). Madrid Gazette (in Spanish). 25 November 1897.
- Real decreto declarando disueltos el Congreso de los Diputados y la parte electiva del Senado, y disponiendo que las Cortes se reúnan en Madrid el 25 de Abril próximo (PDF) (Royal Decree). Madrid Gazette (in Spanish). 26 February 1898.
- Real decreto disponiendo que las elecciones de Senadores en Canarias se verifiquen el 12 de Abril próximo (PDF) (Royal Decree). Madrid Gazette (in Spanish). 15 March 1898.

Other

- Fernández Almagro, Melchor (1943). "Las Cortes del siglo XIX y la práctica electoral" (PDF). Revista de Estudios Políticos (in Spanish) (9–10). Madrid: Centre for Political and Constitutional Studies: 383–419. ISSN 0048-7694.
- Maestre Rosa, Julio (1973). "Francisco Silvela y su liberalismo regeneracionista" (PDF). Revista de Estudios Políticos (in Spanish) (187). Madrid: Centre for Political and Constitutional Studies: 191–226. ISSN 0048-7694.
- López Domínguez, José María (1976). Elecciones y partidos políticos de Puerto Rico: 1809-1898 (PDF) (Thesis) (in Spanish). Vol. 1. Puerto Rico: Complutense University of Madrid.
- Calero, Antonio María (1987). "La prerrogativa regia en la Restauración: teoría y práctica (1875-1902)" (PDF). Revista de Estudios Políticos (in Spanish) (55). Madrid: Centre for Political and Constitutional Studies: 273–315. ISSN 0048-7694.
- Ortega Álvarez, Luis; Santaolaya Machetti, Pablo (1996). "Evolución histórica del sistema electoral español". Revista de las Cortes Generales (in Spanish). 37. Cortes Generales: 65–107. doi:10.33426/rcg/1996/37/784. ISSN 0213-0130.
- Martorell Linares, Miguel Ángel (1997). "La crisis parlamentaria de 1913-1917. La quiebra del sistema de relaciones parlamentarias de la Restauración" (PDF). Revista de Estudios Políticos (in Spanish) (96). Madrid: Centre for Political and Constitutional Studies: 137–161. ISSN 0048-7694.
- Martínez Ruiz, Enrique; Maqueda Abreu, Consuelo; De Diego, Emilio (1999). Atlas histórico de España. La Regencia de María Cristina (1885-1902) (in Spanish). Vol. 2. Bilbao: Ediciones KAL. pp. 109–120. ISBN 9788470903502.
- Roldán de Montaud, Inés (1999). "Política y elecciones en Cuba durante la restauración" (PDF). Revista de Estudios Políticos (in Spanish) (104): 245–287.
- Armengol i Segú, Josep; Varela Ortega, José (2001). El poder de la influencia: geografía del caciquismo en España (1875-1923) (in Spanish). Madrid: Marcial Pons. pp. 655–776. ISBN 9788425911521.
- Avilés Farré, Juan; Elizalde Pérez-Grueso, María Dolores; Sueiro Seoane, Susana (2002). Historia política de España, 1875-1939 (in Spanish). Vol. 1. Madrid: Ediciones Istmo. ISBN 9788470903205.
- García Muñoz, Montserrat (2002). "La documentación electoral y el fichero histórico de diputados". Revista General de Información y Documentación (in Spanish). 12 (1): 93–137. ISSN 1132-1873.
- Carreras de Odriozola, Albert; Tafunell Sambola, Xavier (2005) [1989]. Estadísticas históricas de España, siglos XIX-XX (PDF) (in Spanish). Vol. 1 (II ed.). Bilbao: Fundación BBVA. pp. 1072–1097. ISBN 84-96515-00-1. Archived from the original (PDF) on 24 September 2015.
- Avilés Farré, Juan; Herrerín López, Ángel (2008). El nacimiento del terrorismo en Occidente: Anarquía, nihilismo y violencia revolucionaria (in Spanish). Madrid: Siglo XXI de España Editores. ISBN 9788432315091.
- Martínez Relanzón, Alejandro (2017). "Political Modernization in Spain Between 1876 and 1923". Annales Universitatis Mariae Curie-Skłodowska, Sectio K. 24 (1). Madrid: Maria Curie-Skłodowska University: 145–154. doi:10.17951/k.2017.24.1.145. S2CID 159328027.
