= 1899 Spanish general election =

- 16 April 1899 (Congress); 30 April 1899 (Senate)

All 402 seats in the Congress of Deputies and 180 (of 360) seats in the Senate 202 seats needed for a majority in the Congress of Deputies
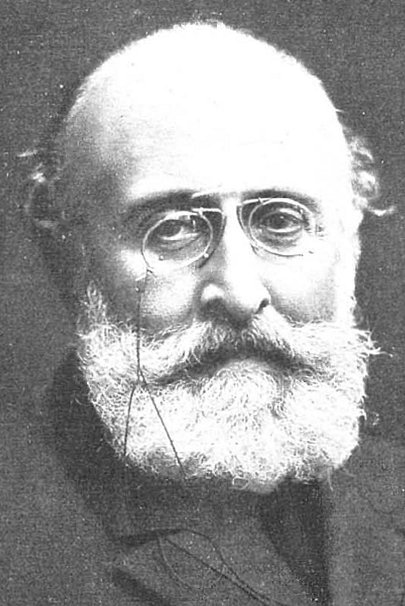

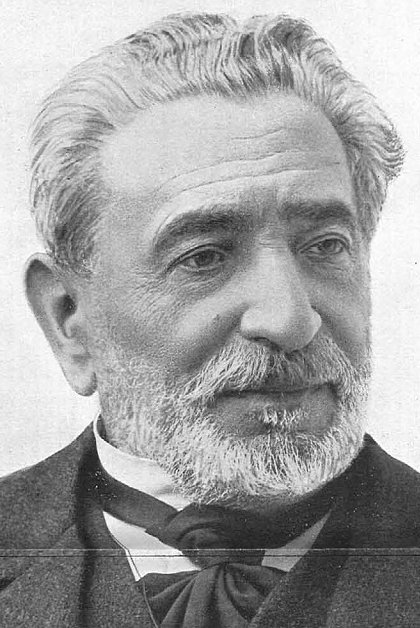

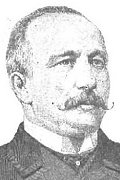

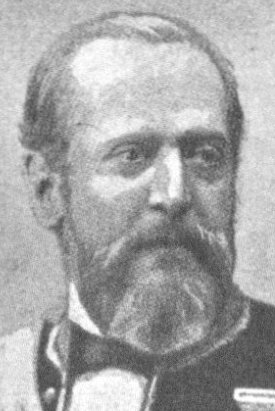

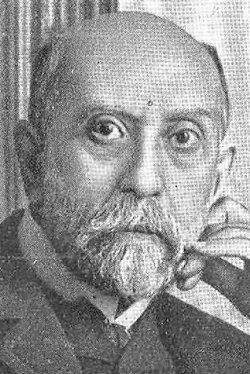

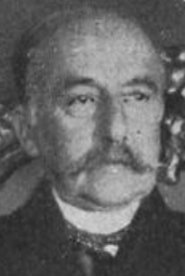
	First party	Second party	Third party
Leader	Francisco Silvela	Práxedes Mateo Sagasta	Germán Gamazo
Party	Conservative (Silvelist)	Liberal	Gamacist
Leader since	1892	1880	1899
Leader's seat	Piedrahita	Logroño	Medina del Campo
Last election	79 D · 36 S	324 D · 121 S	Did not contest
Seats won	240 D · 103 S	92 D · 47 S	32 D · 7 S
Seat change	▲161 D · ▲67 S	▼232 D · ▼74 S	▲32 D · ▲7 S
	Fourth party	Fifth party	Sixth party
Leader	Carlos O'Donnell	Nicolás Salmerón	Enrique de Aguilera y Gamboa
Party	Tetuanist	Republican	Carlist
Leader since	1898	1898	1891
Leader's seat	Senator (for life)	Barcelona (lost)	—
Last election	7 D · 4 S	11 D · 2 S	6 D · 1 S (Note: Results for CT (6 deputies and 0 senators) and PI (0 deputies and 1 senator) in the 1898 election.)
Seats won	11 D · 7 S	11 D · 1 S	3 D · 4 S
Seat change	▲4 D · ▲3 S	0 D · ▼1 S	▼3 D · ▲3 S
- Election results by constituency (Congress)
Prime Minister before election
Francisco Silvela
Conservative
Prime Minister after election
Francisco Silvela
Conservative

A general election was held in Spain on 16 April 1899 (for the Congress of Deputies), and on 30 April 1899 (for the Senate), to elect the members of the 9th Cortes under the Spanish Constitution of 1876, during the Restoration period. All 401 seats in the Congress of Deputies—plus one special district—were up for election, as well as 180 of 360 seats in the Senate.

Since the Pact of El Pardo, an informal system known as turno or turnismo was operated by the monarchy and the country's two main parties—the Conservatives and the Liberals—to determine in advance the outcome of elections by means of electoral fraud, often achieved through the territorial clientelistic networks of local bosses (the caciques), ensuring that both parties would have rotating periods in power. As a result, elections were often neither truly free nor fair, though they could be more competitive in the country's urban centres where caciquism was weaker.

It was the first election to be held after the Spanish–American War, which had seen the loss of the Spanish colonies in the Caribbean and Pacific with the Treaty of Paris signed on 10 December 1898. Together with Spain's defeat in the war, internal rivalries within the Liberal Party led to a major split—led by Germán Gamazo and his "gamacist" faction—and the downfall of Práxedes Mateo Sagasta's government, with Francisco Silvela being appointed as new prime minister in March 1899.

In the ensuing general election, Silvela's Conservative party secured an overall majority in both chambers.

== Background ==
Following the Bourbon Restoration in 1874, the Spanish Constitution of 1876 enshrined Spain as a semi-constitutional monarchy, awarding the monarch—under the royal prerogative—the right of legislative initiative together with the bicameral Cortes; the capacity to veto laws passed by the legislative body; the power to appoint government members (including the prime minister); the ability to grant or deny parliamentary dissolution, the adjournment of legislative sessions and the signature of royal decrees; as well as the title of commander-in-chief of the armed forces. The monarch would play a key role in the turno system by appointing and dismissing governments, which would then organize elections to provide themselves with a parliamentary majority. This informal system allowed the two major "dynastic" political parties at the time, the Conservatives and the Liberals—characterized as oligarchic, elite parties with loose structures dominated by internal factions, each led by powerful individuals—to alternate in power by means of electoral fraud (pucherazo). This was achieved by assigning candidates to districts before the elections were held (encasillado), then arrange their victory through the links between the Ministry of Governance and the territorial clientelistic networks of provincial governors and local bosses (the caciques), excluding minor parties from the power sharing.

Upon assuming office in October 1897, Prime Minister Práxedes Mateo Sagasta recalled Valeriano Weyler as governor of Cuba and appointed pro-autonomy Segismundo Moret as minister of Overseas, in an attempt to tackle the deteriorating situation in the Cuban War of Independence, with two autonomy charters—for Cuba and Puerto Rico—being approved shortly afterwards. The involvement of the United States, particularly following the sinking of the USS Maine and the breakout of the Spanish–American War in April 1898, led to a 10-week campaign in which the Sagasta government sued for peace after the loss of two Spanish naval squadrons in the battles of Santiago de Cuba and Manila Bay. The war resulted in Spain losing its American and Asia-Pacific colonies of Cuba, Puerto Rico, Philippines and Guam under the terms of the 1898 Treaty of Paris, with the remaining Spanish possessions in the Pacific being sold to the German Empire.

Sagasta resigned in March 1899 over his government's perceived responsibility in these losses, with Queen Regent Maria Christina handing power to Francisco Silvela. Germán Gamazo, several times-minister under Liberal cabinets, had split from the party in October 1898 following the Ribot scandal—a controversy involving Cádiz governor and Gamazo's ally Pascual Ribot—which he attributed to an internal conspiration within the Liberal Party to get rid of him as Development minister.

== Overview ==
Under the 1876 Constitution, the Spanish Cortes were conceived as "co-legislative bodies", forming a nearly perfect bicameral system. Both the Congress of Deputies and the Senate exercised legislative, oversight and budgetary functions, sharing almost equal powers, except in budget laws (taxation and public credit)—whose first reading corresponded to Congress—and in impeachment processes against government ministers, where Congress handled indictment and the Senate the trial.

=== Date ===
The term of each chamber of the Cortes—the Congress and one-half of the elective part of the Senate—expired five years from the date of their previous election, unless they were dissolved earlier. The previous elections were held on 27 March 1898 for the Congress and on 10 April 1898 for the Senate, which meant that the chambers' terms would have expired on 27 March and 10 April 1903, respectively.

The monarch had the prerogative to dissolve both chambers at any given time—either jointly or separately—and call a snap election. There was no constitutional requirement for concurrent elections to the Congress and the Senate, nor for the elective part of the Senate to be renewed in its entirety except in the case that a full dissolution was agreed by the monarch. Still, there was only one case of a separate election (for the Senate in 1877) and no half-Senate elections taking place under the 1876 Constitution.

The Cortes were officially dissolved on 16 March 1899, with the corresponding decree setting election day for 16 April (Congress) and 30 April 1899 (Senate) and scheduling for both chambers to reconvene on 2 June.

=== Electoral system ===
Voting for the Congress of Deputies was based on universal manhood suffrage, comprising all Spanish national males over 25 years of age with full civil rights, provided they had two years of residence in a Spanish municipality and were not enlisted ranks in active duty. Additional restrictions excluded those deprived of political rights or barred from public office by a final sentence, criminally imprisoned or convicted, legally incapacitated, bankrupt, public debtors, and homeless.

The Congress of Deputies had one seat per 50,000 inhabitants. Of these, those corresponding to larger urban areas were elected in multi-member constituencies using partial block voting: voters in constituencies electing eight seats or more could choose up to three candidates less than the number of seats at stake; in those with between four and eight seats, up to two less; and in those with between one and four seats, up to one less. The remaining seats were elected in single-member districts by plurality voting and distributed among the provinces of Spain according to population. Additionally, universities, economic societies of Friends of the Country and officially organized chambers of commerce, industry and agriculture, had one seat per 5,000 registered voters. The 46 seats allocated to the Spanish West Indies (Cuba and Puerto Rico) were not redistributed following their 1898 loss in the Spanish–American War.

As a result of the aforementioned allocation, 311 single-member districts (including one special district) were established, and each Congress multi-member constituency (a total of 26, electing 91 seats) was entitled the following seats:

Seats	Constituencies
8	Madrid
7	Barcelona^{(+2)}
5	Palma, Seville^{(+1)}
3	Alicante, Almería, Badajoz, Burgos, Cádiz, Cartagena, Córdoba, Granada, Jaén, Jerez de la Frontera, La Coruña, Lugo, Málaga, Murcia, Oviedo, Pamplona, Santa Cruz de Tenerife, Santander, Tarragona, Valencia, Valladolid, Zaragoza

Voting for the elective part of the Senate was based on censitary suffrage, comprising Spanish male householders of voting age, residing in a Spanish municipality, with full political and civil rights, who met either of the following:

- Being qualified electors (such as archbishops, bishops and cathedral chapter members, in the archdioceses; full academics, in the royal academies; university authorities and professors, in the universities; or provincial deputies);
- Being elected as delegates (either by members with three years of seniority (in the economic societies of Friends of the Country; or by major taxpayers for direct taxes and local authorities, in the local councils).

180 Senate seats were elected using indirect, two-round majority voting. Delegates chosen by local councils—each of which was assigned an initial minimum of one delegate, with one additional delegate for every six councillors—voted for senators together with provincial deputies. After a redistribution of the 19 seats allocated to the former Spanish West Indies, the provinces of Barcelona, Madrid and Valencia were allocated four seats each, and the rest three each, for a total of 150. The remaining 30 seats were allocated to special institutional districts (one each), including major archdioceses, royal academies, universities, and economic societies, (Note: The following were considered as the major districts in each category: Archdioceses: Burgos, Granada, Santiago de Compostela, Seville, Tarragona, Toledo, Valencia, Valladolid, and Zaragoza.; Royal academies: Spanish; History; Fine Arts of San Fernando; Exact, Physical and Natural Sciences; Moral and Political Sciences; and Medicine.; Universities: Madrid, Barcelona, Granada, Oviedo, Salamanca, Santiago, Seville, Valencia, Valladolid, and Zaragoza.; Economic societies of Friends of the Country: Madrid, Barcelona, León, Seville, and Valencia.) each elected by their own qualified electors or delegates. Another 180 seats consisted of senators in their own right (such as the monarch's offspring and the heir apparent once coming of age (16), grandees of Spain with an income of Pts 60,000, certain general officers—captain generals and admirals—the Patriarch of the Indies and archbishops, and the heads of higher courts and state institutions (Note: These comprised the Council of State, the Supreme Court, the Court of Auditors and the Supreme Council of War and Navy.) after two years of service), as well as senators for life directly appointed by the monarch.

The law provided for by-elections to fill vacant seats during the legislative term. At least two vacancies were required to trigger a by-election in Congress multi-member constituencies.

== Candidates ==
=== Nomination rules ===
For the Congress, secular Spanish males of voting age, with full civil rights, could run for election. Causes of ineligibility applied to those excluded from voting or meeting any of the incompatibility rules for deputies, as well as to:

- Public contractors, within their relevant territories;
- Holders of a number of territorial posts (such as government-appointed positions, not including government ministers and Central Administration employees; local and provincial employees; and provincial deputation members), within their areas of jurisdiction, during their term of office and up to one year afterwards.

For the Senate, eligibility was limited to Spanish males over 35 years of age not under criminal prosecution, disfranchisement nor asset seizure, and who either qualified as senators in their own right or belonged (or had belonged) to certain categories:

- Provided an income of Pts 7,500: the presidents of the Senate and the Congress; deputies serving in three different congresses or eight terms; government ministers; bishops; grandees of Spain not eligible as senators in their own right; and various senior officials after two years of service (such as certain general officers—lieutenant generals and vice admirals—and members of higher courts and state institutions); heads of diplomatic missions abroad (ambassadors after two years, and plenipotentiaries after four); heads and full academics in the royal academies; chief engineers; and full professors with four years of service;
- Provided an income of Pts 20,000 or being taxpayers with a minimum quota of Pts 4,000 in direct taxes (paid two years in advance): Spanish nobility; and former deputies, provincial deputies or mayors in provincial capitals or towns over 20,000;
- Having served as senators before the promulgation of the 1876 Constitution.

Other ineligibility provisions for the Senate also applied to a number of territorial officials within their areas of jurisdiction, during their term of office and up to three months afterwards; public contractors; tax collectors; and public debtors.

Incompatibility rules barred representing multiple constituencies simultaneously, as well as combining:

- The role of senator with other legislative roles (deputy, senator and local councillor, except those in Madrid; and provincial deputies within their respective provinces); or with any public post not explicitly permitted under Senate eligibility requirements;
- The role of deputy with any other civil, military or judicial post, with exceptions—and as many as 40 deputies allowed to simultaneously benefit from these—including a number of specific posts based in Madrid, such as any of the aforementioned ones (provided a public salary of Pts 12,500); senior court officials; university authorities and professors; chief engineers; and general officers.

== Results ==
=== Congress of Deputies ===
← Summary of the 16 April 1899 Congress of Deputies election results →
Parties and alliances	Popular vote		Seats
Parties and alliances	Votes	%	Seats
Conservative Union–Liberal Conservative Party (UC–PLC)			240
Liberal Party (PL)			92
Gamacist Liberals (G)			32
Republican Fusion (FR)			11
Tetuanist Conservatives (T)			11
Liberal Reformist Party (PLR)			3
Carlist Coalition (CC)			3
Federal Republican Party (PRF)			2
Blasquist Republicans (RB)			1
Independents (INDEP)			7
Total			402
Votes cast / turnout			
Abstentions			
Registered voters			

Seats
UC–PLC	59.70%
PL	22.89%
G	7.96%
FR	2.74%
T	2.74%
CC	0.75%
PLR	0.75%
PRF	0.50%
RB	0.25%
INDEP	1.74%

=== Senate ===
← Summary of the 30 April 1899 Senate of Spain election results →
Parties and alliances	Seats
Conservative Union–Liberal Conservative Party (UC–PLC)	103
Liberal Party (PL)	47
Gamacist Liberals (G)	7
Tetuanist Conservatives (T)	7
Carlist Coalition (CC)	4
Republican Fusion (FR)	1
Liberal Reformist Party (PLR)	1
Independents (INDEP)	1
Archbishops (ARCH)	9
Total elective seats	180

Seats
UC–PLC	57.22%
PL	26.11%
G	3.89%
T	3.89%
CC	2.22%
FR	0.56%
PLR	0.56%
INDEP	0.56%
ARCH	5.00%

=== Maps ===
Election results by constituency (Congress).

=== Distribution by group ===
Summary of political group distribution in the 9th Restoration Cortes (1899–1901)
Group	Parties and alliances	C	S	Total
UC–PLC	Conservative Union–Liberal Conservative Party (UC–PLC)	238	100	343
UC–PLC	Basque Dynastics (Urquijist) (DV)	1	3	343
UC–PLC	Independents (INDEP)	1	0	343
PL	Liberal Party (PL)	92	47	139
G	Gamacist Liberals (G)	32	7	39
T	Tetuanist Conservatives (T)	11	7	18
FR	National Republican Party (PRN)	10	1	12
FR	Centralist Republican Party (PRC)	1	0	12
CC	Traditionalist Communion (Carlist) (CT)	3	3	7
CC	Integrist Party (PI)	0	1	7
PLR	Liberal Reformist Party (PLR)	3	1	4
PRF	Federal Republican Party (PRF)	2	0	2
RB	Blasquist Republicans (RB)	1	0	1
INDEP	Independents (INDEP)	4	1	8
INDEP	Independent Catholics (CAT)	2	0	8
INDEP	Independent Possibilists (P.IND)	1	0	8
ARCH	Archbishops (ARCH)	0	9	9
Total		402	180	582

== Bibliography ==
Legislation

- Ley mandando que los distritos para las elecciones de Diputados a Cortes sean los que se expresan en la división adjunta (PDF) (Law). Madrid Gazette (in Spanish). 1 January 1871.
- Constitución de la Monarquía Española (PDF) (Constitution). Madrid Gazette (in Spanish). 30 June 1876.
- Ley electoral de Senadores (PDF) (Law). Madrid Gazette (in Spanish). 8 February 1877.
- Ley electoral de los Diputados a Cortes (PDF) (Law). Madrid Gazette (in Spanish). 28 December 1878.
- Ley enumerando los empleos con los cuales es compatible el cargo de Diputado a Cortes (PDF) (Law). Madrid Gazette (in Spanish). 7 March 1880.
- Ley dividiendo la provincia de Guipúzcoa en distritos para la elección de Diputados a Cortes (PDF) (Law). Madrid Gazette (in Spanish). 23 June 1885.
- Ley dividiendo el distrito electoral de Tarrasa en dos, que se denominarán de Tarrasa y de Sabadell (PDF) (Law). Madrid Gazette (in Spanish). 18 January 1887.
- Ley reformando el art. 4º. de la ley de Incompatibilidades (PDF) (Law). Madrid Gazette (in Spanish). 31 July 1887.
- Ley fijando la división de la provincia de Álava en distritos electorales para Diputados a Cortes (PDF) (Law). Madrid Gazette (in Spanish). 10 July 1888.
- Ley electoral para Diputados a Cortes (PDF) (Law). Madrid Gazette (in Spanish). 26 June 1890.
- Ley disponiendo que las primeras y sucesivas elecciones que se verifiquen en la provincia de Zamora se dividirá en siete distritos en la forma que se expresa (PDF) (Law). Madrid Gazette (in Spanish). 18 June 1895.
- Leyes aprobando la división electoral de las provincias de León y Vizcaya (PDF) (Law). Madrid Gazette (in Spanish). 2 August 1895.
- Leyes aprobando la división electoral en las provincias de Sevilla y de Barcelona (PDF) (Law). Madrid Gazette (in Spanish). 5 July 1898.
- Real decreto declarando disueltos el Congreso de los Diputados y la parte electiva del Senado, y convocando á nuevas elecciones en las fechas que se expresan (PDF) (Royal Decree). Madrid Gazette (in Spanish). 16 March 1899.
- Real decreto disponiendo el número de Senadores que han de elegir las provincias que se citan (PDF) (Royal Decree). Madrid Gazette (in Spanish). 16 March 1899.

Other

- Fernández Almagro, Melchor (1943). "Las Cortes del siglo XIX y la práctica electoral" (PDF). Revista de Estudios Políticos (in Spanish) (9–10). Madrid: Centre for Political and Constitutional Studies: 383–419. ISSN 0048-7694.
- Calero, Antonio María (1987). "La prerrogativa regia en la Restauración: teoría y práctica (1875-1902)" (PDF). Revista de Estudios Políticos (in Spanish) (55). Madrid: Centre for Political and Constitutional Studies: 273–315. ISSN 0048-7694.
- Hidalgo Marín, Inés Sofía (1995). University of Valladolid (ed.). "La familia Gamazo: elite castellana en la restauración (1874-1923)". Investigaciones históricas: Época moderna y contemporánea (in Spanish) (15): 107–118. ISSN 0210-9425.
- Ortega Álvarez, Luis; Santaolaya Machetti, Pablo (1996). "Evolución histórica del sistema electoral español". Revista de las Cortes Generales (in Spanish). 37. Cortes Generales: 65–107. doi:10.33426/rcg/1996/37/784. ISSN 0213-0130.
- Martorell Linares, Miguel Ángel (1997). "La crisis parlamentaria de 1913-1917. La quiebra del sistema de relaciones parlamentarias de la Restauración" (PDF). Revista de Estudios Políticos (in Spanish) (96). Madrid: Centre for Political and Constitutional Studies: 137–161. ISSN 0048-7694.
- Martínez Ruiz, Enrique; Maqueda Abreu, Consuelo; De Diego, Emilio (1999). Atlas histórico de España. La Regencia de María Cristina (1885-1902) (in Spanish). Vol. 2. Bilbao: Ediciones KAL. pp. 109–120. ISBN 9788470903502.
- Armengol i Segú, Josep; Varela Ortega, José (2001). El poder de la influencia: geografía del caciquismo en España (1875-1923) (in Spanish). Madrid: Marcial Pons. pp. 655–776. ISBN 9788425911521.
- García Muñoz, Montserrat (2002). "La documentación electoral y el fichero histórico de diputados". Revista General de Información y Documentación (in Spanish). 12 (1): 93–137. ISSN 1132-1873.
- Carreras de Odriozola, Albert; Tafunell Sambola, Xavier (2005) [1989]. Estadísticas históricas de España, siglos XIX-XX (PDF) (in Spanish). Vol. 1 (II ed.). Bilbao: Fundación BBVA. pp. 1072–1097. ISBN 84-96515-00-1. Archived from the original (PDF) on 24 September 2015.
- Martínez Relanzón, Alejandro (2017). "Political Modernization in Spain Between 1876 and 1923". Annales Universitatis Mariae Curie-Skłodowska, Sectio K. 24 (1). Madrid: Maria Curie-Skłodowska University: 145–154. doi:10.17951/k.2017.24.1.145. S2CID 159328027.
- AEBOE (2023). State Agency for the Official State Gazette (ed.). "El desastre de 1898 visto por las figuras políticas de la Restauración: 125 años de la guerra de Cuba (1898-2023)". Official State Gazette (in Spanish). Madrid. ISBN 9788434029002.
