= Liberal Reformist Party =

Liberal Reformist Party may refer to:

- Liberal Reformist Party (Belgium) (Parti Réformateur Libéral), defunct party in Belgium 1971–2002
- Liberal Reformist Party (Dominican Republic) (Partido Reformista Liberal), political party in the Dominican Republic
- Liberal Reformist Party (Puerto Rico) (Partido Liberal Reformista), defunct party in Puerto Rico 1870s
- Liberal Reformist Party (Romania) (Partidul Liberal Reformator), defunct party in Romania 2014–2015
- Liberal Reformist Party (Spain) (Partido Liberal Reformista), defunct party in Spain 1886–1906
- Romanian Popular Party, formerly known as Liberal Reformist Party (Partidul Liberal Reformator), political party in Moldova
