= Traditionalist Communion =

Spanish political movement, 1869–1937

Traditionalist Communion Comunión Tradicionalista
- Leaders: Manuel Fal Conde
- Founded: 1869
- Dissolved: 1937
- Merged into: FET y de las JONS
- Paramilitary wing: Requetés
- Ideology: Carlism; Anti-liberalism; Integrism; Traditionalism; Federalism; Monarchism; Reactionism; Foralism
- Political position: Right-wing
- Religion: Catholicism

Party flag

The Traditionalist Communion (Spanish: Comunión Tradicionalista, CT; Basque: Elkarte Tradizionalista, Catalan: Comunió Tradicionalista) was one of the names adopted by the Carlist movement as a political force since 1869.

== History ==
In October 1931, Carlist claimant to the Spanish throne Duke Jaime died. He was succeeded by the 82-year-old claimant Alfonso Carlos de Borbón, reuniting under him the Integrists led by Olazábal and the "Mellists". They represented a region-based Spanish nationalism with an entrenched identification of Spain and Catholicism. The ensuing radicalized Carlist scene overshadowed the "Jaimists" with a Basque inclination. The Basque(-Navarrese) Statute failed to take off over disagreements on the centrality of Catholicism in 1932, with the new Carlist party Comunión Tradicionalista opting for an open confrontation with the Republic. The Republic established a secular approach of the regime, a division of Church and state, as well as freedom of religion, as France did in 1905, an approach traditionalists fundamentally opposed.

The Comunión Tradicionalista (1932) showed an ultra-Catholic, anti-secular position, and plotted for a military takeover, while adopting far-right apocalyptic views and talking of a final clash with an alliance of alleged anti-Christian forces.

The October 1934 Revolution cost the life of the Carlist deputy Marcelino Oreja Elósegui, with Manuel Fal Condé taking over from young Carlists clustering around the AET (Jaime del Burgo and Mario Ozcoidi) in their pursuit to overthrow the Republic. The Carlists started to prepare for an armed definite clash with the Republic and its different leftist groups. From the initial defensive Decurias of Navarre (deployed in party seats and churches), the Requeté grew into a well-trained and strongest offensive paramilitary group in Spain when Manuel Fal Condé took the reins. It numbered 30,000 red berets (8,000 in Navarre and 22,000 in Andalusia).

When the Spanish Civil War broke out in 1936 following the election of a coalition of socialist, communist, and anarchist parties, the Traditionalist Communion sided with the Spanish Nationalists, despite ideological differences with the Falangists, out of shared Catholicism and repression under the Republic. Seeking to unify all Nationalist Forces, General Francisco Franco announced that all political parties, other than FET y de las JONS, were dissolved, and the Traditionalist Communion ceased to exist.

== Ideology ==
Carlism is a reactionary, monarchist, and extremely Catholic ideology. It developed after King Ferdinand VII changed the succession laws by the Pragmatic Sanction of 1830, meaning Don Carlos would no longer become the next king. Its main tenets are "God, Country, and King", and it spawned many other political parties, the most notable of which was the Carlist Party of Euskal Herria, which was formed as an underground party during the fascist government and went on to run in the elections following the democratization of Spain.

== Legacy ==
Carlism remained a scattered movement until the end of the dictatorship. While a fraction of the movement actively supported the Francoist regime, most of Carlists were forced to go underground.

The Traditionalist Communion was reorganised during the 1950s and 1960s in a situation of illegality and prohibition imposed in Francoist Spain to university and workers' organisations of non-integrated Carlism (Group of Traditionalist Students, AET at the university; Traditionalist Worker’s Movement, MOT) into the only Francoist party, with the support of prince Carlos Hugo, Duke of Parma.

In 1970, the Carlist Party was officially established by a Congress of the Carlist People in Arbonne, in which it adopted a program for the ideological change of Carlism towards self-management socialism and the conversion of the Carlist movement into a federal and democratic party of the masses on a class basis which aspired to a pact between the dynasty and the people to a socialist monarchy.

The socialistic turn of both Duke Carlos Hugo and his son Prince Carlos, Duke of Parma was rejected by the more right-wing factions of Carlism, under the leadership of Prince Sixtus Henry of Bourbon-Parma, who re-established the Traditionalist Communion in 1975. In 1986, the Communion, alongside two other right-wing Carlist parties, established the Traditionalist Carlist Communion, a political party which promotes the traditional version of Carlism, based upon integrism, foralism and reactionism.

== Electoral Results ==
Election	Seats	+/-	Pretender	Chief
1869	23 / 381	New	Carlos María de Borbón y Austria-Este	Ramón Cabrera
1871	51 / 424	▲28	Carlos María de Borbón y Austria-Este	Francisco Javier Fernández de Henestrosa y Santisteban
April 1872	38 / 424	▼13	Carlos María de Borbón y Austria-Este	Cándido Nocedal
August 1872	Abstained	—	Carlos María de Borbón y Austria-Este	Cándido Nocedal
1873	Abstained	—	Carlos María de Borbón y Austria-Este	Cándido Nocedal
1876	Abstained	—	Carlos María de Borbón y Austria-Este	Cándido Nocedal
1879	Abstained	—	Carlos María de Borbón y Austria-Este	Cándido Nocedal
1881	Abstained	—	Carlos María de Borbón y Austria-Este	Cándido Nocedal
1884	Abstained	—	Carlos María de Borbón y Austria-Este	Cándido Nocedal
1886	Abstained	—	Carlos María de Borbón y Austria-Este	Carlos María de Borbón y Austria-Este
1891	4 / 446	▼34	Carlos María de Borbón y Austria-Este	Enrique de Aguilera y Gamboa
1893	8 / 447	▲4	Carlos María de Borbón y Austria-Este	Enrique de Aguilera y Gamboa
1896	10 / 447	▲2	Carlos María de Borbón y Austria-Este	Enrique de Aguilera y Gamboa
1898	6 / 447	▼4	Carlos María de Borbón y Austria-Este	Enrique de Aguilera y Gamboa
1899	Abstained	—	Carlos María de Borbón y Austria-Este	Enrique de Aguilera y Gamboa
1901	6 / 402	No change	Carlos María de Borbón y Austria-Este	Matías Barrio y Mier
1903	7 / 403	▲1	Carlos María de Borbón y Austria-Este	Matías Barrio y Mier
1905	4 / 404	▼3	Jaime Pío de Borbón y Borbón-Parma	Matías Barrio y Mier
1907	8 / 404	▲4	Jaime Pío de Borbón y Borbón-Parma	Matías Barrio y Mier
1910	10 / 404	▲2	Jaime Pío de Borbón y Borbón-Parma	Bartolomé Feliu
1914	6 / 408	▼4	Jaime Pío de Borbón y Borbón-Parma	Bartolomé Feliu
1916	9 / 409	▲3	Jaime Pío de Borbón y Borbón-Parma	Enrique de Aguilera y Gamboa
1918	9 / 409	No change	Jaime Pío de Borbón y Borbón-Parma	Enrique de Aguilera y Gamboa
1919	8 / 409	▼1	Jaime Pío de Borbón y Borbón-Parma	Pascual Comín y Moya
1920	6 / 409	▼2	Jaime Pío de Borbón y Borbón-Parma	Luis Hernando de Larramendi
1923	Abstained	—	Jaime Pío de Borbón y Borbón-Parma	José Selva y Mergelina
1931	4 / 470	▼2	Jaime Pío de Borbón y Borbón-Parma	José Selva y Mergelina
1933	20 / 473	▲16	Alfonso Carlos de Borbón y Austria-Este	Tomás Domínguez Arévalo
1936	9 / 473	▼11	Alfonso Carlos de Borbón y Austria-Este	Manuel Fal Conde
