= 1898 Puerto Rican general election =

1898 Puerto Rico elections
- March 27, 1898

General elections were held in the Spanish territory of Puerto Rico on March 27, 1898, alongside the Spanish general elections. The elections were the first and only under Spanish rule, as the outbreak of the Spanish–American War less than a month later led to Spain losing the territory to the United States.

The elections were held after the island was granted an Autonomy Charter by the Spanish government on November 25, 1897, which allowed Puerto Rico to elect members to the Cortes Generales and established a bicameral legislature for the island, with a fully-elected House of Representatives and a Council of Administration whose members were a mix of elected delegates and appointees made by the Governor. The elections were held under universal male suffrage with a voting age of 25.

Four parties contested the elections; the Liberal Fusionist Party led by Luis Muñoz Rivera, the Orthodox Autonomist Party, the Unconditional Party and the Opportunistic Autonomous Group. The result was a victory for the Liberal Fusionist Party, which won a majority of seats in the new legislature. Voter turnout was 71%.

== Results ==
=== House of Representatives ===
Party	Votes	%	Seats
Liberal Fusionist Party	82,627	81.47	25
Orthodox Autonomist Party	15,068	14.86	5
Unconditional Party	2,144	2.11	1
Opportunistic Autonomous Group	1,585	1.56	1
Total	101,424	100.00	32
Source: Mavalet

=== Council of Administration ===
Party	Seats
Liberal Fusionist Party	5
Orthodox Autonomist Party	2
Unconditional Party	1
Total	8
Source: Mavalet

=== Cortes Generales ===
Party	Seats
Liberal Fusionist Party	10
Orthodox Autonomist Party	6
Total	16
Source: Mavalet

== Aftermath ==
The newly elected legislature met for the first time on July 17. However, on July 25 the United States invaded the territory as a part of the Spanish–American War. Following the American victory and the Treaty of Paris signed on December 10, Spain relinquished control of Puerto Rico, Guam and the Philippines to the United States.
