= Conservative Union (Spain) =

Conservative Union Unión Conservadora
- Leader: Francisco Silvela
- Founded: 1892
- Dissolved: 1899
- Split from: Liberal Conservative Party
- Merged into: Liberal Conservative Party
- Ideology: Liberal conservatism Monarchism
- Political position: Centre-right

The Conservative Union (Spanish: Unión Conservadora), until 1897 known as the Silvelist Party or the Silvelists (Spanish: silvelistas), was a Spanish political party created by Francisco Silvela. Originally a faction within the Conservative Party, it established itself as a full party in October 1897.

Following his appointment as prime minister in 1899, Silvela became the undisputed leader of the Conservative Party.

== Electoral performance ==
=== Restoration Cortes ===
Election	Popular vote			Seats	Leader	Outcome
Election	Votes	%	#	Seats	Leader	Outcome
1893			#4	17 / 401	Francisco Silvela	PL majority
1896			#3	12 / 401	Francisco Silvela	PLC majority
1898			#2	82 / 401	Francisco Silvela	PL majority
1899			#1	228 / 402	Francisco Silvela	UC–PLC majority

== Bibliography ==
- Maestre Rosa, Julio (1973). "Francisco Silvela y su liberalismo regeneracionista". Revista de Estudios Políticos (in Spanish) (187): 191–226. ISSN 0048-7694.
