= National Union (Spain, 1900) =

National Union Unión Nacional
- Founded: January 1900
- Dissolved: 1902
- Ideology: Regenerationism

The National Union (Spanish: Unión Nacional, UN) was a regenerationist Spanish political party launched in January 1900. One of its main members was Joaquín Costa. It had little electoral success and disbanded by 1902.
