= Tetuanists =

Tetuanists Tetuanistas
- Leader: Carlos O'Donnell
- Founded: 1898
- Dissolved: 1903
- Split from: Conservative Party
- Ideology: Conservatism; Monarchism
- Political position: Right-wing

The Tetuanists (Spanish: Tetuanistas), also known as the Tetuanist Conservatives (Spanish: Conservadores Tetuanistas, T), were a political faction within the Liberal Conservative Party (PLC), led by Carlos O'Donnell, 2nd Duke of Tetuan. After Antonio Cánovas del Castillo's assassination in 1897, O'Donnell initially took over the PLC. However, most Conservative MPs joined the ascendant Conservative Union of Francisco Silvela. O'Donnell eventually split from the PLC, allowing Silvela to take over the party as the official Conservative leader.

The faction disbanded after O'Donnell's death in February 1903.
