= Urquijists =

Urquijists Urquijistas
- Founded: 1880
- Dissolved: 1923
- Ideology: Monarchism
- Political position: Centre

The Urquijists (Spanish: Urquijistas) were a monarchist political group in the province of Álava during the Spanish Restoration period.
