= Elite party =

Type of political party

An elite party is a political party consisting of members of the societal elite, particularly members of parliament, who agree to co-operate politically in the spirit of principles and goals.

Elite parties form as groupings of elite members particularly in situations where an individual politician's political standing can be secured without the support of large populations. An elite party can form internally in the parliament and its political power is derived from that of its individual members. Elite parties have practically no extra-parliamentary structure and are generally more flexible than mass parties. The central role of independent, powerful individuals implies that their structure is often loose and that their policy may be internally disputed due to disagreements between individual members.

== See also ==
- Capitalist state
- Elite
- Elite theory
- Particracy
- Party of power
- Plutocracy
