= List of universities in Spain =

This is a list of universities in Spain, which are accredited by Spanish institutions to award academic degrees. The table shows both public (50) and private (46) universities that are registered in the Register of Universities, Centers and Qualifications (Registro de Universidades, Centros y Títulos (RUCT), in Spanish), established by means of Spanish Royal Decree 1509/2008 of 12 September 2008.

Arms/Logo	University	Established	Seat of rectorate	Autonomous community	Type
-	Al-Andalusía Islamic University of Spain	2018	Seville	Andalusia	Islamic
	University of Alcalá	1977	Alcalá de Henares	Madrid	Public
-	Alfonso X University	1993	Villanueva de la Cañada	Madrid	Private
-	University of Alicante	1979	San Vicente del Raspeig	Valencian Community	Public
-	University of Almería	1993	Almería	Andalusia	Public
	International University of Andalusia	1994	Seville	Andalusia	Public
-	Catholic University of Ávila	1996	Ávila	Castile and León	Catholic
-	Atlantic-Mediterranean Technological University	2023	Málaga	Andalusia	Private
	European University of the Atlantic	2013	Santander	Cantabria	Private
-	University of the Middle Atlantic	2015	Las Palmas de Gran Canaria	Canary Islands	Private
	University of the Balearic Islands	1978	Palma	Balearic Islands	Public
	Autonomous University of Barcelona	1968	Cerdanyola del Vallès	Catalonia	Public
	International University of Catalonia	1997	Barcelona	Catalonia	Catholic
	University of Barcelona	1450	Barcelona	Catalonia	Public
	University of the Basque Country	1980	Leioa	Basque Country	Public
-	University of Burgos	1994	Burgos	Castile and León	Public
	University of Cádiz	1979	Cádiz	Andalusia	Public
	Camilo José Cela University	1998	Villanueva de la Cañada	Madrid	Private
	European University of Canarias	2010	La Orotava	Canary Islands	Private
	University of Cantabria	1972	Santander	Cantabria	Public
-	Polytechnic University of Cartagena	1998	Cartagena	Region of Murcia	Public
	Polytechnic University of Catalonia	1971	Barcelona	Catalonia	Public
	University of Castilla–La Mancha	1985	Ciudad Real	Castilla–La Mancha	Public
	Abat Oliba CEU University	2003	Barcelona	Catalonia	Catholic
	Universidad CEU Cardenal Herrera	1999	Moncada	Valencian Community	Catholic
	CEU San Pablo University	1993	Madrid	Madrid	Catholic
	Carlos III University of Madrid	1989	Getafe	Madrid	Public
	Comillas Pontifical University	1890	Madrid	Madrid	Catholic
	University of Córdoba	1972	Córdoba	Andalusia	Public
	University of A Coruña	1989	A Coruña	Galicia	Public
-	University of the Conservation (in Catalan)	1991	Barcelona	Catalonia	Public
	CUNEF University	2019	Madrid	Madrid	Private
-	University of Deusto	1886	Bilbao	Basque Country	Catholic
-	University of Design, Innovation, and Technology (in Spanish)	2022	Madrid	Madrid	Private
	National University of Distance Education	1972	Madrid	Andalusia, Aragon, Asturias, Balearic Islands, Basque Country, Canary Islands, Cantabria, Castilla–La Mancha, Castile and León, Catalonia, Madrid, Ceuta, Extremadura, Galicia, Melilla, Navarre, Region of Murcia, La Rioja, Valencian Community	Public
	Miguel Hernández University of Elche	1996	Elche	Valencian Community	Public
-	ESIC University	2019	Madrid	Madrid	Private
	European University	1973	Barcelona	Catalonia	Private
	University of Extremadura	1973	Badajoz	Extremadura	Public
-	Fernando III University	2023	Seville	Andalusia	Catholic
-	Fernando Pessoa Canarias University	2014	Santa María de Guía	Canary Islands	Private
	Francisco de Vitoria University	1993	Pozuelo de Alarcón	Madrid	Catholic
-	European University Gasteiz	2021	Vitoria-Gasteiz	Basque Country	Private
	University of Girona	1446	Girona	Catalonia	Public
	University of Granada	1531	Granada	Andalusia	Public
	University of Huelva	1993	Huelva	Andalusia	Public
	IE University	2008	Segovia	Castile and León	Private
-	Intercontinental University of Business	2021	Santiago de Compostela	Galicia	Private
	University Isabel I	2011	Burgos	Castile and León	Private
	University of Jaén	1993	Jaén	Andalusia	Public
-	Jaume I University	1991	Castellón de la Plana	Valencian Community	Public
	King Juan Carlos University	1996	Móstoles	Madrid	Public
	University of La Laguna	1927	San Cristóbal de La Laguna	Canary Islands	Public
	University of León	1979	León	Castile and León	Public
	University of Lleida	1297/1991	Lleida	Catalonia	Public
-	Loyola University Andalusia	2011	Seville	Andalusia	Catholic
	Autonomous University of Madrid	1968	Madrid	Madrid	Public
	Complutense University of Madrid	1499	Madrid	Madrid	Public
	Universidad a Distancia de Madrid	2006	Collado Villalba	Madrid	Private
	European University of Madrid	1995	Villaviciosa de Odón	Madrid	Private
	Technical University of Madrid	1971	Madrid	Madrid	Public
	University of Málaga	1972	Málaga	Andalusia	Public
	University of Murcia	1914	Murcia	Region of Murcia	Public
-	Menéndez Pelayo International University	1932	Madrid	Madrid	Public
-	Miguel de Cervantes European University	2002	Valladolid	Castile and León	Private
	Mondragon University	1997	Arrasate/Mondragón	Basque Country	Private
	University of Navarre	1952	Pamplona	Navarre	Catholic
	Public University of Navarre	1987	Pamplona	Navarre	Public
	Nebrija University	1995	Hoyo de Manzanares	Madrid	Private
	Open University of Catalonia	1990	Barcelona	Catalonia	Private
	University of Oviedo	1608	Oviedo	Asturias	Public
	Pablo de Olavide University	1997	Seville	Andalusia	Public
	University of Las Palmas de Gran Canaria	1989	Las Palmas de Gran Canaria	Canary Islands	Public
	Pompeu Fabra University	1990	Barcelona	Catalonia	Public
-	Les Roches Marbella International School of Hotel Management	1995	Marbella	Andalusia	Private
-	Schellhammer Business School	2009	Estepona	Andalusia	Private
	Harbour.Space University	2015	Barcelona	Catalonia	Private
-	Ramon Llull University	1990	Barcelona	Catalonia	Catholic
-	University of La Rioja	1992	Logroño	La Rioja	Public
	International University of La Rioja	2008	Logroño	La Rioja	Private
-	Rovira i Virgili University	1991	Tarragona	Catalonia	Public
	University of Salamanca	1218	Salamanca	Castile and León	Public
-	Pontifical University of Salamanca	1940	Salamanca	Castile and León	Catholic
	San Antonio Catholic University of Murcia	1996	Murcia	Region of Murcia	Catholic
-	San Damaso Ecclesiastical University	2011	Madrid	Madrid	Catholic
-	San Jorge University (in Spanish)	2005	Villanueva de Gállego	Aragon	Catholic
-	Valencia Catholic University Saint Vincent Martyr	2003	Valencia	Valencian Community	Catholic
	University of Santiago de Compostela	1495	Santiago de Compostela	Galicia	Public
	University of Seville	1505	Seville	Andalusia	Public
	University of Valencia	1499	Valencia	Valencian Community	Public
	Valencian International University	2008	Castellón de la Plana	Valencian Community	Private
-	Polytechnic University of Valencia	1968	Valencia	Valencian Community	Public
	University of Valladolid	1241	Valladolid	Castile and León	Public
	University of Vic	1997	Vic	Catalonia	Private
	University of Vigo	1990	Vigo	Galicia	Public
	Villanueva University	2019	Madrid	Madrid	Catholic
	University of Zaragoza	1542	Zaragoza	Aragon	Public

== See also ==
- Higher education in Spain
- List of colleges and universities by country
- List of colleges and universities
