= Liberal Reformist Party (Spain) =

Liberal Reformist Party Partido Liberal Reformista
- Leader: Francisco Romero Robledo
- Founded: 1886 (first); 1898 (second)
- Dissolved: 1891 (first); 17 March 1906 (second)
- Split from: Conservative Party
- Merged into: Conservative Party
- Ideology: Liberal conservatism Monarchism

The Liberal Reformist Party (Spanish: Partido Liberal Reformista, PLR), also referred to as the Romerists (Spanish: Romeristas), was a Spanish political party launched by Francisco Romero Robledo in 1886 from elements of the Conservative Party over his disagreement with Antonio Cánovas del Castillo to hand over power to the Liberal Party, following the Pact of El Pardo. It rejoined the Conservatives following Romero's appointment as Overseas minister in Canova's government in 1891.

Romero reconstituted the party in 1898, lasting until his death on 3 March 1906. The members of his party would end up joining the Conservative Party of Antonio Maura.

== Bibliography ==
- Soldevilla, Fernando (1906). El Año Político 1905 (in Spanish). Madrid: National Library of Spain.
- Soldevilla, Fernando (1907). El Año Político 1906 (in Spanish). Madrid: National Library of Spain.
- Dardé Morales, Carlos (1986). "Las elecciones de diputados de 1886" (PDF). Anales de la Universidad de Alicante. Historia Contemporánea (in Spanish) (5): 223–259. doi:10.14198/AnContemp.1986.5.10. ISSN 0212-5080.
- Avilés Farré, Juan; Elizalde Pérez-Grueso, María Dolores; Sueiro Seoane, Susana (2002). Historia política de España, 1875-1939 (in Spanish). Vol. 1. Tres Cantos: Ediciones Istmo. ISBN 84-7090-320-9.
