= 1891 Spanish general election =

- 1 February 1891 (Congress); 15 February 1891 (Senate)

All 446 seats in the Congress of Deputies and 180 (of 360) seats in the Senate 224 seats needed for a majority in the Congress of Deputies
- Registered: 4,800,000
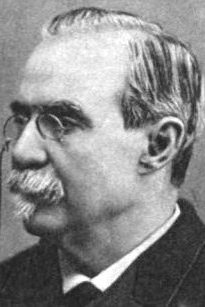

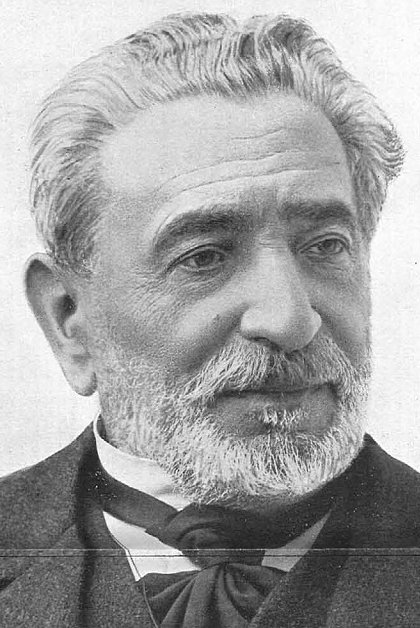

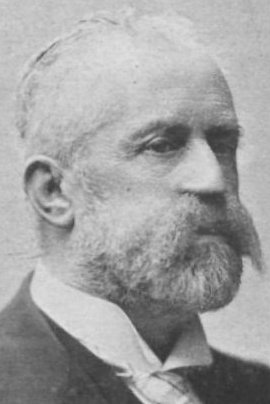

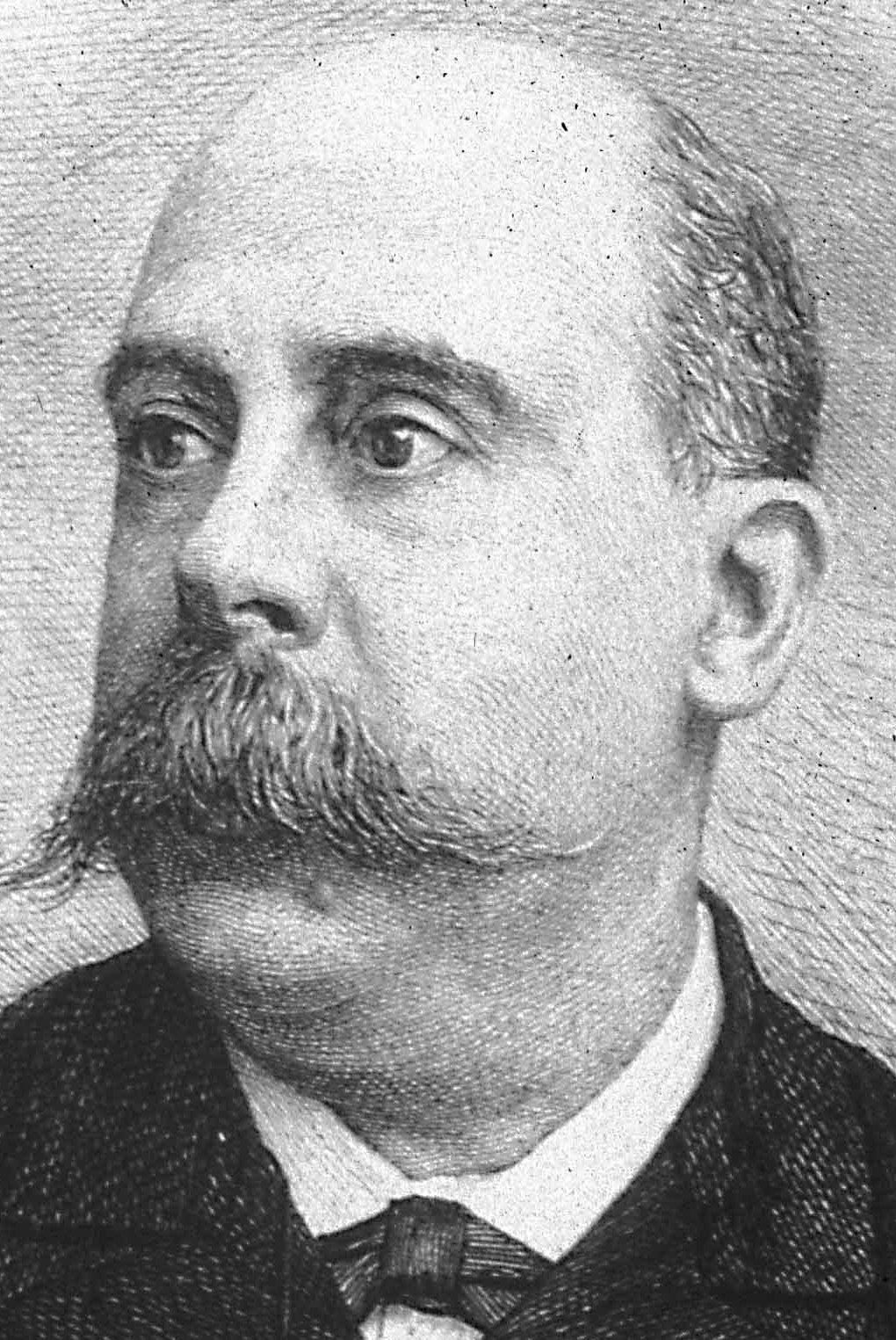

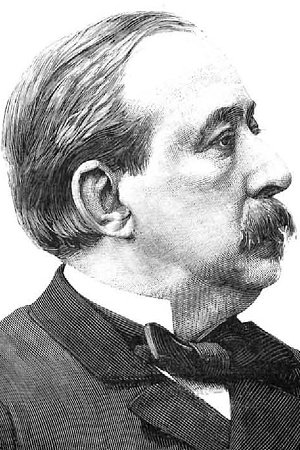

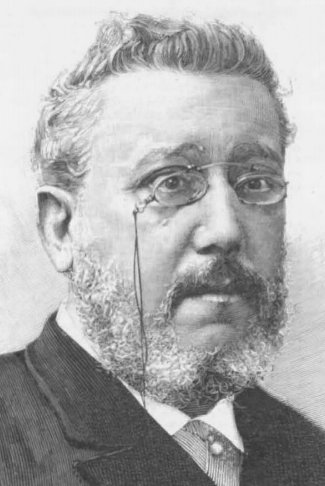
	First party	Second party	Third party
Leader	Antonio Cánovas del Castillo	Práxedes Mateo Sagasta	Francisco Romero Robledo
Party	Conservative	Liberal	Liberal Reformist
Leader since	1874	1880	1886
Leader's seat	Cieza	Logroño	Antequera
Last election	70 D · 33 S	321 D · 125 S (Note: Results for PL (309 deputies and 123 senators) and ID (12 deputies and 2 senators) in the 1886 election.)	11 D · 4 S
Seats won	284 D · 114 S	100 D · 40 S	17 D · 8 S
Seat change	▲214 D · ▲81 S	▼221 D · ▼85 S	▲6 D · ▲4 S
	Fourth party	Fifth party	Sixth party
Leader	Emilio Castelar	Manuel Ruiz Zorrilla	Cristino Martos
Party	Republican	Progressive	Martist
Leader since	1879	1880	1890
Leader's seat	Huesca	Barcelona	Orgaz
Last election	15 D · 6 S (Note: Results for PDP (11 deputies and 4 senators), PLRP (3 deputies and 1 senator), PRF (1 deputy and 0 senators) and PLA (0 deputies and 1 senator) in the 1886 election.)	10 D · 1 S	Did not contest
Seats won	15 D · 1 S	12 D · 0 S	8 D · 1 S
Seat change	0 D · ▼5 S	▲2 D · ▼1 S	▲8 D · ▲1 S
Prime Minister before election
Antonio Cánovas del Castillo
Conservative
Prime Minister after election
Antonio Cánovas del Castillo
Conservative

A general election was held in Spain on 1 February 1891 (for the Congress of Deputies), and on 15 February 1891 (for the Senate), to elect the members of the 5th Cortes under the Spanish Constitution of 1876, during the Restoration period. All 442 seats in the Congress of Deputies—plus four special districts—were up for election, as well as 180 of 360 seats in the Senate. Following a 1890 reform of the electoral law that saw a change from the previous censitary suffrage to a universal manhood suffrage, the electorate was extended to about 27.3% of the country's population.

Since the Pact of El Pardo, an informal system known as turno or turnismo was operated by the monarchy and the country's two main parties—the Conservatives and the Liberals—to determine in advance the outcome of elections by means of electoral fraud, often achieved through the territorial clientelistic networks of local bosses (the caciques), ensuring that both parties would have rotating periods in power. As a result, elections were often neither truly free nor fair, though they could be more competitive in the country's urban centres where caciquism was weaker.

The election saw a large parliamentary majority for the Conservative Party after Antonio Cánovas del Castillo's return to power in July 1890, following the end of the Liberal "turn" of government between 1885 and 1890.

== Background ==
Following the Bourbon Restoration in 1874, the Spanish Constitution of 1876 enshrined Spain as a semi-constitutional monarchy, awarding the monarch—under the royal prerogative—the right of legislative initiative together with the bicameral Cortes; the capacity to veto laws passed by the legislative body; the power to appoint government members (including the prime minister); the ability to grant or deny parliamentary dissolution, the adjournment of legislative sessions and the signature of royal decrees; as well as the title of commander-in-chief of the armed forces. The monarch would play a key role in the turno system by appointing and dismissing governments, which would then organize elections to provide themselves with a parliamentary majority. This informal system allowed the two major "dynastic" political parties at the time, the Conservatives and the Liberals—characterized as oligarchic, elite parties with loose structures dominated by internal factions, each led by powerful individuals—to alternate in power by means of electoral fraud (pucherazo). This was achieved by assigning candidates to districts before the elections were held (encasillado), then arrange their victory through the links between the Ministry of Governance and the territorial clientelistic networks of provincial governors and local bosses (the caciques), excluding minor parties from the power sharing.

The 1885–1890 Liberal government of Práxedes Mateo Sagasta (later to be known as the "Long Government" or "Long Parliament", in reference to it being the only one during the Restoration period to last its full five year-term) had seen the introduction of many liberalizing reforms: the 1886 abolition of patronage removed the last vestiges of slavery in Cuba; the 1887 Associations Law allowed the establishment of trade unions such as the General Union of Workers (UGT), as well as the celebration of associative congresses and meetings; the 1888 Jury Law favoured freedom of press by ending prior censorship and taking the jurisdiction over crimes such as slander and defamation away from the military; and the 1889 Civil Code which, coupled with the Administrative Procedure Law and the 1888 Administrative Litigation Law (also dubbed in Spanish as Ley Santamaría de Paredes), codified and structured the existing civil and administrative laws. Finally, the approval of a new electoral law in 1890 reinstated universal manhood suffrage in Spain, definitely repealing censitary suffrage for all forthcoming elections and extending the political franchise from about 5% of the population to nearly 25%. Other changes included a simplification of the electoral process as well as the removal of the system allowing deputies to be elected through cumulative voting.

Sagasta was dismissed by Queen Regent Maria Christina—nearly at the end of his five year-mandate—in the context of the "hunch crisis" (Spanish: crisis de la corazonada), referred to as such based on a comment from General Arsenio Martínez Campos claiming to have the "hunch" that the Liberals' days in power were numbered, amid rumours of the opposition threatening to unveil a scandal that could hurt Sagasta's reputation or that of his family. Under the provisions of the Pact of El Pardo, this paved the way for the next "turn" of government under the Conservatives of Antonio Cánovas del Castillo, who assumed office in July 1890 and started preparations for the general election that was to provide the new government with a parliamentary majority.

== Overview ==
Under the 1876 Constitution, the Spanish Cortes were conceived as "co-legislative bodies", forming a nearly perfect bicameral system. Both the Congress of Deputies and the Senate exercised legislative, oversight and budgetary functions, sharing almost equal powers, except in budget laws (taxation and public credit)—whose first reading corresponded to Congress—and in impeachment processes against government ministers, where Congress handled indictment and the Senate the trial.

=== Date ===
The term of each chamber of the Cortes—the Congress and one-half of the elective part of the Senate—expired five years from the date of their previous election, unless they were dissolved earlier. The previous elections were held on 4 April 1886 for the Congress and on 25 April 1886 for the Senate, which meant that the chambers' terms would have expired on 4 and 25 April 1891, respectively.

The monarch had the prerogative to dissolve both chambers at any given time—either jointly or separately—and call a snap election. There was no constitutional requirement for concurrent elections to the Congress and the Senate, nor for the elective part of the Senate to be renewed in its entirety except in the case that a full dissolution was agreed by the monarch. Still, there was only one case of a separate election (for the Senate in 1877) and no half-Senate elections taking place under the 1876 Constitution.

The Cortes were officially dissolved on 29 December 1890, with the corresponding decree setting election day for 1 February (Congress) and 15 February 1891 (Senate) and scheduling for both chambers to reconvene on 2 March.

=== Electoral system ===
Voting for the Congress of Deputies was based on universal manhood suffrage—introduced by the electoral law of 1890—comprising all Spanish national males over 25 years of age with full civil rights, provided they had two years of residence in a Spanish municipality and were not enlisted ranks in active duty. In the Spanish West Indies (Cuba and Puerto Rico), voting was based on censitary suffrage, comprising Spanish males of voting age who met either of the following:

- Being taxpayers with a minimum quota of Pts 125 ($25) in property taxes (paid one year in advance) or in corporate taxes (paid two years in advance);
- Holding specific positions (such as full academics in the royal academies, cathedral chapter members and parish priests, active public employees with a salary of Pts 2,000, retired public employees, general officers, awarded painters or sculptors, senior court officials and certified teachers);
- Meeting the two-year residence requirement while proving a professional qualification.

Former Cuban slaves were barred from voting until three years after becoming freedmen. Additional restrictions excluded those deprived of political rights or barred from public office by a final sentence, criminally imprisoned or convicted, legally incapacitated, bankrupt, public debtors, and homeless.

The Congress of Deputies had one seat per 50,000 inhabitants. Of these, those corresponding to larger urban areas were elected in multi-member constituencies using partial block voting: voters in constituencies electing eight seats or more could choose up to three candidates less than the number of seats at stake; in those with between four and eight seats, up to two less; and in those with between one and four seats, up to one less. The remaining seats were elected in single-member districts by plurality voting and distributed among the provinces of Spain according to population. The 1890 electoral law abolished cumulative voting and introduced special districts, granting universities, economic societies of Friends of the Country and officially organized chambers of commerce, industry and agriculture, one seat per 5,000 registered voters. Cuba and Puerto Rico were allocated 30 and 15 seats, respectively.

As a result of the aforementioned allocation, 339 single-member districts (including four special districts) were established, and each Congress multi-member constituency (a total of 31, electing 107 seats) was entitled the following seats:

Seats	Constituencies
8	Madrid
6	Havana^{(−2)}
5	Barcelona, Palma
4	Santa Clara^{(−1)}, Seville
3	Alicante, Almería, Badajoz, Burgos, Cádiz, Cartagena, Córdoba, Granada, Jaén, Jerez de la Frontera, La Coruña, Lugo, Málaga, Matanzas, Murcia, Oviedo, Pamplona, Pinar del Río, Santa Cruz de Tenerife, Santander, Santiago de Cuba^{(−1)}, Tarragona, Valencia, Valladolid, Zaragoza

Voting for the elective part of the Senate was also based on censitary suffrage, comprising Spanish male householders of voting age, residing in a Spanish municipality, with full political and civil rights, who met either of the following:

- Being qualified electors (such as archbishops, bishops and cathedral chapter members, in the archdioceses; full academics, in the royal academies; university authorities and professors, in the universities; or provincial deputies);
- Being elected as delegates (either by members with three years of seniority (in the economic societies of Friends of the Country; or by major taxpayers for direct taxes and local authorities, in the local councils).

180 Senate seats were elected using indirect, two-round majority voting. Delegates chosen by local councils—each of which was assigned an initial minimum of one delegate, with one additional delegate for every six councillors—voted for senators together with provincial deputies. The provinces of Álava, Albacete, Ávila, Biscay, Cuenca, Guadalajara, Guipúzcoa, Huelva, Logroño, Matanzas, Palencia, Pinar del Río, Puerto Príncipe, Santa Clara, Santander, Santiago de Cuba, Segovia, Soria, Teruel, Valladolid and Zamora were allocated two seats each, and the rest three each, for a total of 147. The remaining 33 seats were allocated to special institutional districts (one each), including major archdioceses, royal academies, universities, and economic societies, (Note: The following were considered as the major districts in each category: Archdioceses: Burgos, Granada, Santiago de Compostela, Santiago de Cuba, Seville, Tarragona, Toledo, Valencia, Valladolid, and Zaragoza.; Royal academies: Spanish; History; Fine Arts of San Fernando; Exact, Physical and Natural Sciences; Moral and Political Sciences; and Medicine.; Universities: Madrid, Barcelona, Granada, Havana, Oviedo, Salamanca, Santiago, Seville, Valencia, Valladolid, and Zaragoza.; Economic societies of Friends of the Country: Madrid, Barcelona, Havana–Puerto Rico, León, Seville, and Valencia.) each elected by their own qualified electors or delegates. Another 180 seats consisted of senators in their own right (such as the monarch's offspring and the heir apparent once coming of age (16), grandees of Spain with an income of Pts 60,000, certain general officers—captain generals and admirals—the Patriarch of the Indies and archbishops, and the heads of higher courts and state institutions (Note: These comprised the Council of State, the Supreme Court, the Court of Auditors and the Supreme Council of War and Navy.) after two years of service), as well as senators for life directly appointed by the monarch.

The law provided for by-elections to fill vacant seats during the legislative term. At least two vacancies were required to trigger a by-election in Congress multi-member constituencies.

== Candidates ==
=== Nomination rules ===
For the Congress, secular Spanish males of voting age, with full civil rights, could run for election. Causes of ineligibility applied to those excluded from voting or meeting any of the incompatibility rules for deputies, and to former slaves in Cuba until ten years after becoming freedmen, as well as to:

- Public contractors, within their relevant territories;
- Holders of a number of territorial posts (such as government-appointed positions, not including government ministers and Central Administration employees; local and provincial employees; and provincial deputation members), within their areas of jurisdiction, during their term of office and up to one year afterwards.

For the Senate, eligibility was limited to Spanish males over 35 years of age not under criminal prosecution, disfranchisement nor asset seizure, and who either qualified as senators in their own right or belonged (or had belonged) to certain categories:

- Provided an income of Pts 7,500: the presidents of the Senate and the Congress; deputies serving in three different congresses or eight terms; government ministers; bishops; grandees of Spain not eligible as senators in their own right; and various senior officials after two years of service (such as certain general officers—lieutenant generals and vice admirals—and members of higher courts and state institutions); heads of diplomatic missions abroad (ambassadors after two years, and plenipotentiaries after four); heads and full academics in the royal academies; chief engineers; and full professors with four years of service;
- Provided an income of Pts 20,000 or being taxpayers with a minimum quota of Pts 4,000 in direct taxes (paid two years in advance): Spanish nobility; and former deputies, provincial deputies or mayors in provincial capitals or towns over 20,000;
- Having served as senators before the promulgation of the 1876 Constitution.

Other ineligibility provisions for the Senate also applied to a number of territorial officials within their areas of jurisdiction, during their term of office and up to three months afterwards; public contractors; tax collectors; and public debtors.

Incompatibility rules barred representing multiple constituencies simultaneously, as well as combining:

- The role of senator with other legislative roles (deputy, senator and local councillor, except those in Madrid; and provincial deputies within their respective provinces); or with any public post not explicitly permitted under Senate eligibility requirements;
- The role of deputy with any other civil, military or judicial post, with exceptions—and as many as 40 deputies allowed to simultaneously benefit from these—including a number of specific posts based in Madrid, such as any of the aforementioned ones (provided a public salary of Pts 12,500); senior court officials; university authorities and professors; chief engineers; and general officers.

== Results ==
=== Congress of Deputies ===
← Summary of the 1 February 1891 Congress of Deputies election results →
Parties and alliances	Popular vote		Seats
Parties and alliances	Votes	%	Seats
Liberal Conservative Party (PLC)			284
Liberal Party (PL)			100
Liberal Reformist Party (PLR)			17
Republican Coalition (CR)			15
Progressive Republican Party (PRP)			12
Martists (M)			8
Traditionalist Communion (Carlist) (CT)			4
Integrist Party (PI)			2
Independents (INDEP)			4
Total			446
Votes cast / turnout			
Abstentions			
Registered voters	4,800,000		

Seats
PLC	63.68%
PL	22.42%
PLR	3.81%
CR	3.36%
PRP	2.69%
M	1.79%
CT	0.90%
PI	0.45%
INDEP	0.90%

=== Senate ===
← Summary of the 15 February 1891 Senate of Spain election results →
Parties and alliances	Seats
Liberal Conservative Party (PLC)	114
Liberal Party (PL)	40
Liberal Reformist Party (PLR)	8
Republican Coalition (CR)	1
Martists (M)	1
Traditionalist Communion (Carlist) (CT)	1
Integrist Party (PI)	1
Independents (INDEP)	4
Archbishops (ARCH)	10
Total elective seats	180

Seats
PLC	63.33%
PL	22.22%
PLR	4.44%
CR	0.56%
M	0.56%
CT	0.56%
PI	0.56%
INDEP	2.22%
ARCH	5.56%

=== Distribution by group ===
Summary of political group distribution in the 5th Restoration Cortes (1891–1893)
Group	Parties and alliances	C	S	Total
PLC	Liberal Conservative Party (PLC)	259	105	398
PLC	Constitutional Union of Cuba (UCC)	13	6	398
PLC	Unconditional Spanish Party (PIE)	9	2	398
PLC	Independents (INDEP)	2	0	398
PLC	Basque Dynastics (Urquijist) (DV)	1	1	398
PL	Liberal Party (PL)	86	32	140
PL	Constitutional Union of Cuba (UCC)	10	7	140
PL	Unconditional Spanish Party (PIE)	4	1	140
PLR	Liberal Reformist Party (PLR)	14	8	25
PLR	Constitutional Union of Cuba (UCC)	3	0	25
CR	Possibilist Democratic Party (PDP)	6	1	16
CR	Federal Republican Party (PRF)	5	0	16
CR	Centralist Republican Party (PRC)	2	0	16
CR	Puerto Rican Autonomist Party (PAP)	2	0	16
PRP	Progressive Republican Party (PRP)	12	0	12
M	Martists (M)	8	1	9
CT	Traditionalist Communion (Carlist) (CT)	4	1	5
PI	Integrist Party (PI)	2	1	3
INDEP	Independents (INDEP)	4	3	8
INDEP	Basque Dynastics (Urquijist) (DV)	0	1	8
ARCH	Archbishops (ARCH)	0	10	10
Total		446	180	626

== Bibliography ==
Legislation

- Ley mandando que los distritos para las elecciones de Diputados a Cortes sean los que se expresan en la división adjunta (PDF) (Law). Madrid Gazette (in Spanish). 1 January 1871.
- Decreto mandando se verifiquen en Puerto Rico las elecciones ordinarias de Senadores y Diputados a Cortes (PDF) (Decree). Madrid Gazette (in Spanish). 1 April 1871.
- Constitución de la Monarquía Española (PDF) (Constitution). Madrid Gazette (in Spanish). 30 June 1876.
- Ley electoral de Senadores (PDF) (Law). Madrid Gazette (in Spanish). 8 February 1877.
- Ley electoral de los Diputados a Cortes (PDF) (Law). Madrid Gazette (in Spanish). 28 December 1878.
- Ley dictando reglas para la elección de Senadores en las islas de Cuba y Puerto Rico (PDF) (Law). Madrid Gazette (in Spanish). 9 January 1879.
- Ley enumerando los empleos con los cuales es compatible el cargo de Diputado a Cortes (PDF) (Law). Madrid Gazette (in Spanish). 7 March 1880.
- Real decreto determinando el número de Senadores que habrán de elegirse en cada una de las provincias con motivo de las próximas elecciones (PDF) (Royal Decree). Madrid Gazette (in Spanish). 30 June 1881.
- Ley fijando la división de la provincia de Vizcaya en distritos para la elección de Diputados a Cortes y la de aquellos en secciones (PDF) (Law). Madrid Gazette (in Spanish). 21 March 1883.
- Ley dividiendo la provincia de Guipúzcoa en distritos para la elección de Diputados a Cortes (PDF) (Law). Madrid Gazette (in Spanish). 23 June 1885.
- Ley dividiendo el distrito electoral de Tarrasa en dos, que se denominarán de Tarrasa y de Sabadell (PDF) (Law). Madrid Gazette (in Spanish). 18 January 1887.
- Ley reformando el art. 4º. de la ley de Incompatibilidades parlamentarias de 7 de Marzo de 1880 (PDF) (Law). Madrid Gazette (in Spanish). 31 July 1887.
- Ley fijando la división de la provincia de Álava en distritos electorales para Diputados a Cortes (PDF) (Law). Madrid Gazette (in Spanish). 10 July 1888.
- Ley electoral para Diputados a Cortes (PDF) (Law). Madrid Gazette (in Spanish). 26 June 1890.
- Real decreto disponiendo que mientras no se publique nueva ley Electoral rija en la isla de Cuba la división en circunscripciones y distritos para la elección de Diputados a Cortes aprobada en el Congreso en la forma que se expresa (PDF) (Royal Decree). Madrid Gazette (in Spanish). 18 December 1890.
- Real decreto declarando disuelto el Consejo de los Diputados y la parte electiva del Senado, mandando reunir las Cortes el día 2 de Marzo próximo, y señalando los días en que habrán de verificarse las elecciones de Diputados y Senadores (PDF) (Royal Decree). Madrid Gazette (in Spanish). 29 December 1890.

Other

- Fernández Almagro, Melchor (1943). "Las Cortes del siglo XIX y la práctica electoral" (PDF). Revista de Estudios Políticos (in Spanish) (9–10). Madrid: Centre for Political and Constitutional Studies: 383–419. ISSN 0048-7694.
- López Domínguez, José María (1976). Elecciones y partidos políticos de Puerto Rico: 1809-1898 (PDF) (Thesis) (in Spanish). Vol. 1. Puerto Rico: Complutense University of Madrid.
- Calero, Antonio María (1987). "La prerrogativa regia en la Restauración: teoría y práctica (1875-1902)" (PDF). Revista de Estudios Políticos (in Spanish) (55). Madrid: Centre for Political and Constitutional Studies: 273–315. ISSN 0048-7694.
- Ortega Álvarez, Luis; Santaolaya Machetti, Pablo (1996). "Evolución histórica del sistema electoral español". Revista de las Cortes Generales (in Spanish). 37. Cortes Generales: 65–107. doi:10.33426/rcg/1996/37/784. ISSN 0213-0130.
- Martorell Linares, Miguel Ángel (1997). "La crisis parlamentaria de 1913-1917. La quiebra del sistema de relaciones parlamentarias de la Restauración" (PDF). Revista de Estudios Políticos (in Spanish) (96). Madrid: Centre for Political and Constitutional Studies: 137–161. ISSN 0048-7694.
- Martínez Ruiz, Enrique; Maqueda Abreu, Consuelo; De Diego, Emilio (1999). Atlas histórico de España. La Regencia de María Cristina (1885-1902) (in Spanish). Vol. 2. Bilbao: Ediciones KAL. pp. 109–120. ISBN 9788470903502.
- Roldán de Montaud, Inés (1999). "Política y elecciones en Cuba durante la restauración" (PDF). Revista de Estudios Políticos (in Spanish) (104): 245–287.
- Caballero Domínguez, Margarita (1999). "El derecho de representación: sufragio y leyes electorales" (PDF). Ayer (in Spanish) (34): 41–63.
- Armengol i Segú, Josep; Varela Ortega, José (2001). El poder de la influencia: geografía del caciquismo en España (1875-1923) (in Spanish). Madrid: Marcial Pons. pp. 655–776. ISBN 9788425911521.
- García Muñoz, Montserrat (2002). "La documentación electoral y el fichero histórico de diputados". Revista General de Información y Documentación (in Spanish). 12 (1): 93–137. ISSN 1132-1873.
- Carreras de Odriozola, Albert; Tafunell Sambola, Xavier (2005) [1989]. Estadísticas históricas de España, siglos XIX-XX (PDF) (in Spanish). Vol. 1 (II ed.). Bilbao: Fundación BBVA. pp. 1072–1097. ISBN 84-96515-00-1. Archived from the original (PDF) on 24 September 2015.
- Sampedro Escolar, José Luis (2013). "Sagasta: Nobleza y liberalismo". Berceo. Revista Riojana de Ciencias Sociales y Humanidades (in Spanish) (164). Logroño: 131–177. ISSN 0210-8550.
- Martínez Relanzón, Alejandro (2017). "Political Modernization in Spain Between 1876 and 1923". Annales Universitatis Mariae Curie-Skłodowska, Sectio K. 24 (1). Madrid: Maria Curie-Skłodowska University: 145–154. doi:10.17951/k.2017.24.1.145. S2CID 159328027.
