= 1886 Spanish general election =

- 4 April 1886 (Congress); 25 April 1886 (Senate)

All 434 (Note: Including one seat by cumulative voting.) seats in the Congress of Deputies and 180 (of 360) seats in the Senate 218 seats needed for a majority in the Congress of Deputies
- Registered: 807,175
- Turnout: 475,712 (58.9%)
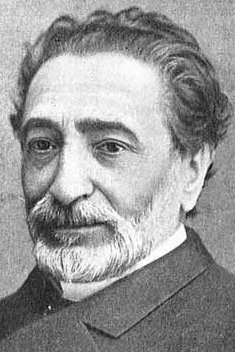

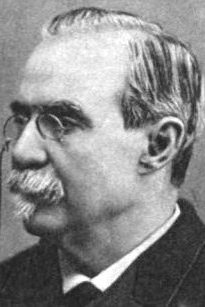

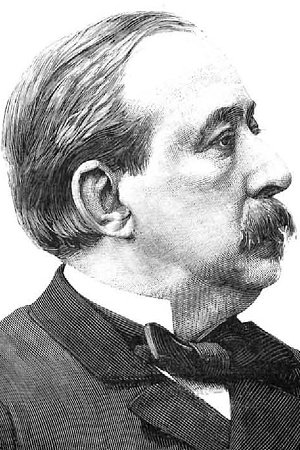

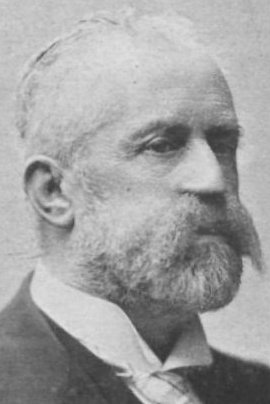

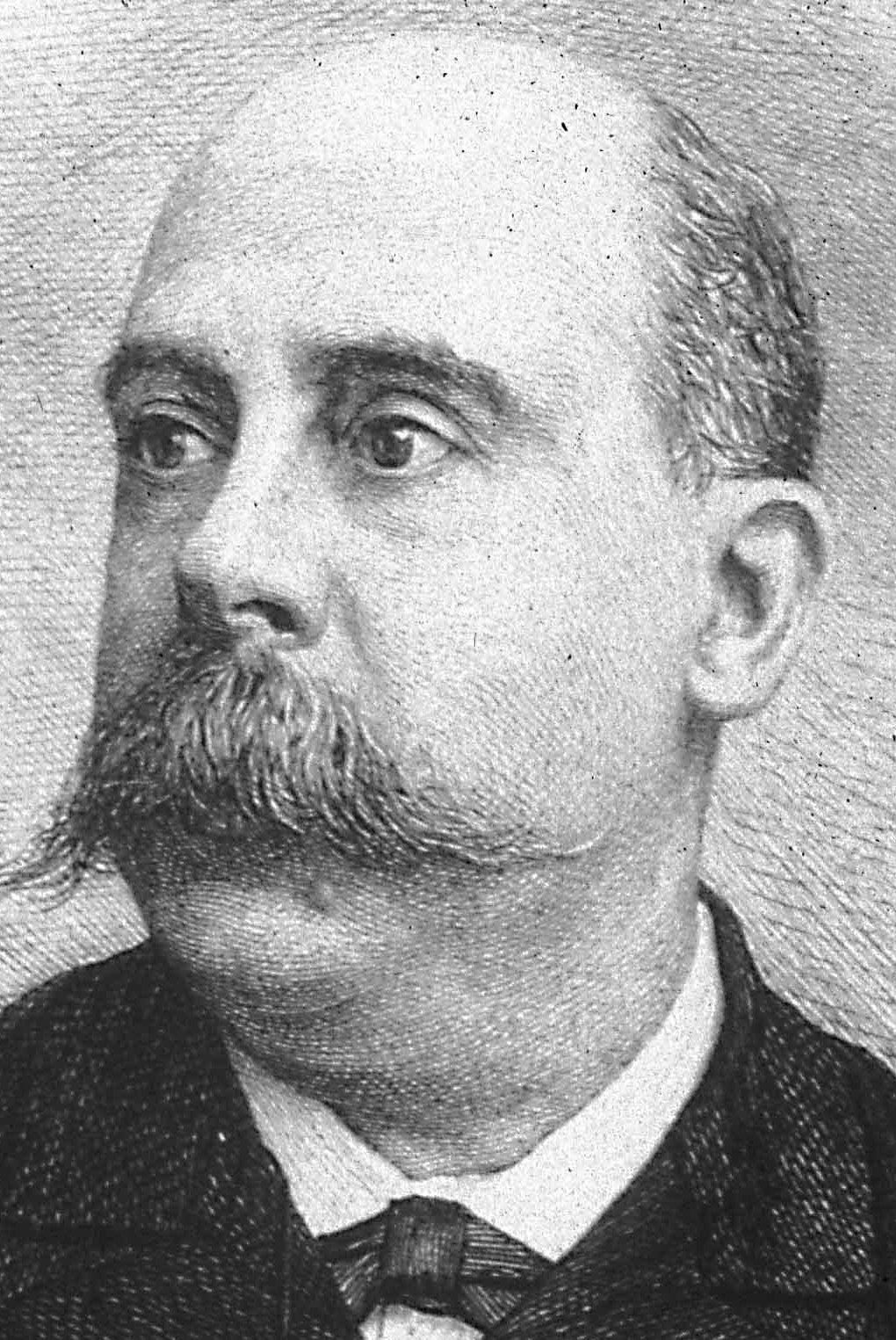

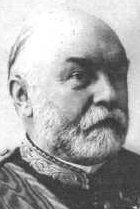
	First party	Second party	Third party
Leader	Práxedes Mateo Sagasta	Antonio Cánovas del Castillo	Manuel Ruiz Zorrilla
Party	Liberal	Conservative	Republican
Leader since	1880	1874	1880
Leader's seat	Logroño	Cieza	—
Last election	43 D · 15 S	342 D · 140 S	9 D · 0 S
Seats won	309 D · 123 S	70 D · 33 S	20 D · 3 S
Seat change	▲266 D · ▲108 S	▼272 D · ▼107 S	▲11 D · ▲3 S
	Fourth party	Fifth party	Sixth party
Leader	Francisco Romero Robledo	Emilio Castelar	José López Domínguez
Party	Liberal Reformist	Possibilist	Leftist
Leader since	1886	1879	1884
Leader's seat	Antequera	Huesca	Coín
Last election	Did not contest	3 D · 2 S	36 D · 8 S
Seats won	11 D · 4 S	11 D · 4 S	12 D · 2 S
Seat change	▲11 D · ▲4 S	▲8 D · ▲2 S	▼24 D · ▼6 S
Prime Minister before election
Práxedes Mateo Sagasta
Liberal
Prime Minister after election
Práxedes Mateo Sagasta
Liberal

A general election was held in Spain on 4 April 1886 (for the Congress of Deputies) and on 25 April 1886 (for the Senate), to elect the members of the 4th Cortes under the Spanish Constitution of 1876, during the Restoration period. All 434 seats in the Congress of Deputies were up for election, as well as 180 of 360 seats in the Senate. The electorate comprised about 4.6% of the country's population.

During this period, an informal system known as turno or turnismo was operated by the country's two main parties—the Conservatives and the Liberals—to determine in advance the outcome of elections by means of electoral fraud, often achieved through the territorial clientelistic networks of local bosses (the caciques), ensuring that both parties would have rotating periods in power. As a result, elections were often neither truly free nor fair, though they could be more competitive in the country's urban centres where caciquism was weaker.

The election resulted in a large majority for the government-supported candidates of the Liberal Party, which was possible through Antonio Cánovas del Castillo's peaceful handover of power to Práxedes Mateo Sagasta, in what came to be known as the Pact of El Pardo. Running against the pact were the Francisco Romero Robledo and José López Domínguez-led factions within the Conservative and Liberal parties, respectively, but which failed to achieve decisive breakthroughs. The resulting legislature would come to be known as the "Long Parliament" (Spanish: Parlamento Largo): lasting from 1886 to 1891, it would be the only one during the Restoration period to last its full five year-term.

== Background ==
Following the Bourbon Restoration in 1874, the Spanish Constitution of 1876 enshrined Spain as a semi-constitutional monarchy, awarding the monarch—under the royal prerogative—the right of legislative initiative together with the bicameral Cortes; the capacity to veto laws passed by the legislative body; the power to appoint government members (including the prime minister); the ability to grant or deny parliamentary dissolution, the adjournment of legislative sessions and the signature of royal decrees; as well as the title of commander-in-chief of the armed forces. The monarch would play a key role in the turno system by appointing and dismissing governments, which would then organize elections to provide themselves with a parliamentary majority. This informal system allowed the two major "dynastic" political parties at the time, the Conservatives and the Liberals—characterized as oligarchic, elite parties with loose structures dominated by internal factions, each led by powerful individuals—to alternate in power by means of electoral fraud (pucherazo). This was achieved by assigning candidates to districts before the elections were held (encasillado), then arrange their victory through the links between the Ministry of Governance and the territorial clientelistic networks of provincial governors and local bosses (the caciques), excluding minor parties from the power sharing.

The death of King Alfonso XII in November 1885 at the age of 27, with no heir apparent and with her spouse—Maria Christina of Austria—poised to become queen regent under the provisions of the Constitution, had seen a prospective political crisis being averted by the informal Pact of El Pardo between Antonio Cánovas del Castillo, incumbent prime minister and Conservative leader, and Práxedes Mateo Sagasta, leader of the opposition Liberal Party. Through the agreement, both political parties—which had dominated Spanish politics during the early Restoration period—aimed to temporarily thwart the political fighting within the monarchist camp and provide stability to the regime by definitely establishing the turno system of alternance. As a result, Cánovas peacefully handed over power to Sagasta, who earlier that year had unified the various factions within his party under the "guarantee law": an agreement under which the Liberals would develop the freedoms and rights recognized during the Democratic Sexennium in exchange for the acceptance of shared sovereignty between the King and the Cortes, a basic principle of the 1876 Constitution. Francisco Romero Robledo, who vied for power with Francisco Silvela within the Conservative party, split off in protest to Cánovas's "voluntary relinquishment" of government. In May 1886, Maria Cristina would give birth to Alfonso XII's posthumous son, who would automatically become King Alfonso XIII.

The 1884–1885 period saw some calamities that the Cánovas government had to handle, such as the Alcudia bridge disaster, the 1884 Andalusian earthquake and the 1885 cholera epidemic in Spain. It also saw the Berlin Conference, the starting point of the Scramble for Africa, in which Spain successfully claimed and established the colony of Spanish Sahara. The Carolines Question, a conflict between Spain and the German Empire over the sovereignty of the Caroline Islands and Palau in the western Pacific, was resolved through arbitration by the Holy See.

== Overview ==
Under the 1876 Constitution, the Spanish Cortes were conceived as "co-legislative bodies", forming a nearly perfect bicameral system. Both the Congress of Deputies and the Senate exercised legislative, oversight and budgetary functions, sharing almost equal powers, except in budget laws (taxation and public credit)—whose first reading corresponded to Congress—and in impeachment processes against government ministers, where Congress handled indictment and the Senate the trial.

=== Date ===
The term of each chamber of the Cortes—the Congress and one-half of the elective part of the Senate—expired five years from the date of their previous election, unless they were dissolved earlier. The previous elections were held on 27 April 1884 for the Congress and on 8 May 1884 for the Senate, which meant that the chambers' terms would have expired on 27 April and 8 May 1889, respectively.

The monarch had the prerogative to dissolve both chambers at any given time—either jointly or separately—and call a snap election. There was no constitutional requirement for concurrent elections to the Congress and the Senate, nor for the elective part of the Senate to be renewed in its entirety except in the case that a full dissolution was agreed by the monarch. Still, there was only one case of a separate election (for the Senate in 1877) and no half-Senate elections taking place under the 1876 Constitution.

The Cortes were officially dissolved on 8 March 1886, with the corresponding decree setting election day for 4 April (Congress) and 25 April 1886 (Senate) and scheduling for both chambers to reconvene on 10 May.

=== Electoral system ===
Voting for the Congress of Deputies was based on censitary suffrage, comprising Spanish national males over 25 years of age who met either of the following:

- Being taxpayers with a minimum quota of Pts 25 in property taxes (paid one year in advance) or Pts 50 in corporate taxes (paid two years in advance);
- Holding specific positions (such as full academics in the royal academies, cathedral chapter members and parish priests, active public employees with a salary of Pts 2,000, retired public employees, general officers, awarded painters or sculptors, senior court officials and certified teachers);
- Having two years of residence in a Spanish municipality while proving a professional qualification.

In the Spanish West Indies (Cuba and Puerto Rico) the taxpayer requirement was higher (Pts 125, or $25), while former Cuban slaves were barred from voting until three years after becoming freedmen. In the Basque Provinces and Navarre—where taxes were not paid directly—voters had instead to prove wealth equivalent to an income of Pts 4,800; or Pts 2,400 in real estate, crops or livestock. Additional restrictions excluded those deprived of political rights or barred from public office by a final sentence, criminally imprisoned or convicted, legally incapacitated, bankrupt, and public debtors.

The Congress of Deputies had one seat per 50,000 inhabitants. Of these, those corresponding to larger urban areas were elected in multi-member constituencies using partial block voting: voters in constituencies electing eight seats could choose up to six candidates; in those with seven seats, up to five; in those with six seats, up to four; in those with four or five seats, up to three; and in those with three seats, up to two. The remaining seats were elected in single-member districts by plurality voting and distributed among the provinces of Spain according to population. Up to 10 additional members could be elected through cumulative voting if they ran in several single-member districts and obtained over 10,000 votes overall. Cuba and Puerto Rico were allocated 24 and 15 seats, respectively.

As a result of the aforementioned allocation, 322 single-member districts were established, and each Congress multi-member constituency (a total of 31, electing 111 seats) was entitled the following seats:

Seats	Constituencies
8	Havana, Madrid
5	Barcelona, Palma, Santa Clara
4	Santiago de Cuba, Seville
3	Alicante, Almería, Badajoz, Burgos, Cádiz, Cartagena, Córdoba, Granada, Jaén, Jerez de la Frontera, La Coruña, Lugo, Málaga, Matanzas, Murcia, Oviedo, Pamplona, Pinar del Río, Santa Cruz de Tenerife, Santander, Tarragona, Valencia, Valladolid, Zaragoza

Voting for the elective part of the Senate was also based on censitary suffrage, comprising Spanish male householders of voting age, residing in a Spanish municipality, with full political and civil rights, who met either of the following:

- Being qualified electors (such as archbishops, bishops and cathedral chapter members, in the archdioceses; full academics, in the royal academies; university authorities and professors, in the universities; or provincial deputies);
- Being elected as delegates (either by members with three years of seniority (in the economic societies of Friends of the Country; or by major taxpayers for direct taxes and local authorities, in the local councils).

180 Senate seats were elected using indirect, two-round majority voting. Delegates chosen by local councils—each of which was assigned an initial minimum of one delegate, with one additional delegate for every six councillors—voted for senators together with provincial deputies. The provinces of Álava, Albacete, Ávila, Biscay, Cuenca, Guadalajara, Guipúzcoa, Huelva, Logroño, Matanzas, Palencia, Pinar del Río, Puerto Príncipe, Santa Clara, Santander, Santiago de Cuba, Segovia, Soria, Teruel, Valladolid and Zamora were allocated two seats each, and the rest three each, for a total of 147. The remaining 33 seats were allocated to special institutional districts (one each), including major archdioceses, royal academies, universities, and economic societies, (Note: The following were considered as the major districts in each category: Archdioceses: Burgos, Granada, Santiago de Compostela, Santiago de Cuba, Seville, Tarragona, Toledo, Valencia, Valladolid, and Zaragoza.; Royal academies: Spanish; History; Fine Arts of San Fernando; Exact, Physical and Natural Sciences; Moral and Political Sciences; and Medicine.; Universities: Madrid, Barcelona, Granada, Havana, Oviedo, Salamanca, Santiago, Seville, Valencia, Valladolid, and Zaragoza.; Economic societies of Friends of the Country: Madrid, Barcelona, Havana–Puerto Rico, León, Seville, and Valencia.) each elected by their own qualified electors or delegates. Another 180 seats consisted of senators in their own right (such as the monarch's offspring and the heir apparent once coming of age (16), grandees of Spain with an income of Pts 60,000, certain general officers—captain generals and admirals—the Patriarch of the Indies and archbishops, and the heads of higher courts and state institutions (Note: These comprised the Council of State, the Supreme Court, the Court of Auditors and the Supreme Council of War and Navy.) after two years of service), as well as senators for life directly appointed by the monarch.

The law provided for by-elections to fill vacant seats during the legislative term. At least two vacancies were required to trigger a by-election in Congress multi-member constituencies; when only two vacancies were to be filled, voters could choose only one candidate.

== Candidates ==
=== Nomination rules ===
For the Congress, secular Spanish males of voting age, with full civil rights, could run for election. Causes of ineligibility applied to those excluded from voting and to former slaves in Cuba until ten years after becoming freedmen, as well as to:

- Public contractors, within their relevant territories and up to one year after the end of their contracts;
- Holders of a number of territorial posts (such as government-appointed positions, not including Central Administration employees; local and provincial employees; certain technical officials—civil, mining and forest engineers—and presidents of polling stations), within their areas of jurisdiction, during their term of office and up to one year afterwards;
- Holders of any government-appointed post between the election call and election day, for those seeking a seat through cumulative voting.

For the Senate, eligibility was limited to Spanish males over 35 years of age not under criminal prosecution, disfranchisement nor asset seizure, and who either qualified as senators in their own right or belonged (or had belonged) to certain categories:

- Provided an income of Pts 7,500: the presidents of the Senate and the Congress; deputies serving in three different congresses or eight terms; government ministers; bishops; grandees of Spain not eligible as senators in their own right; and various senior officials after two years of service (such as certain general officers—lieutenant generals and vice admirals—and members of higher courts and state institutions); heads of diplomatic missions abroad (ambassadors after two years, and plenipotentiaries after four); heads and full academics in the royal academies; chief engineers; and full professors with four years of service;
- Provided an income of Pts 20,000 or being taxpayers with a minimum quota of Pts 4,000 in direct taxes (paid two years in advance): Spanish nobility; and former deputies, provincial deputies or mayors in provincial capitals or towns over 20,000;
- Having served as senators before the promulgation of the 1876 Constitution.

Other ineligibility provisions for the Senate also applied to a number of territorial officials within their areas of jurisdiction, during their term of office and up to three months afterwards; public contractors; tax collectors; and public debtors.

Incompatibility rules barred representing multiple constituencies simultaneously, as well as combining:

- The role of senator with other legislative roles (deputy, senator and local councillor, except those in Madrid; and provincial deputies within their respective provinces); or with any public post not explicitly permitted under Senate eligibility requirements;
- The role of deputy with any other civil, military or judicial post, with exceptions—and as many as 40 deputies allowed to simultaneously benefit from these—including a number of specific posts based in Madrid, such as any of the aforementioned ones (provided a public salary of Pts 12,500); senior court officials; university authorities and professors; chief engineers; and general officers.

== Results ==
=== Congress of Deputies ===
← Summary of the 4 April 1886 Congress of Deputies election results →
Parties and alliances	Popular vote		Seats
Parties and alliances	Votes	%	Seats
Liberal Party (PL)			309
Liberal Conservative Party (PLC)			70
Republican Union (UR)			20
Dynastic Left (ID)			12
Liberal Reformist Party (PLR)			11
Possibilist Democratic Party (PDP)			11
Traditionalist Communion (Carlist) (CT)			1
Total	475,712		434
Votes cast / turnout	475,712	58.94	
Abstentions	331,463	41.06	
Registered voters	807,175		

Seats
PL	71.20%
PLC	16.13%
UR	4.61%
ID	2.76%
PLR	2.53%
PDP	2.53%
CT	0.23%

=== Senate ===
← Summary of the 25 April 1886 Senate of Spain election results →
Parties and alliances	Seats
Liberal Party (PL)	123
Liberal Conservative Party (PLC)	33
Liberal Reformist Party (PLR)	4
Possibilist Democratic Party (PDP)	4
Republican Union (UR)	3
Dynastic Left (ID)	2
Independents (INDEP)	1
Archbishops (ARCH)	10
Total elective seats	180

Seats
PL	68.33%
PLC	18.33%
PLR	2.22%
PDP	2.22%
UR	1.67%
ID	1.11%
INDEP	0.56%
ARCH	5.56%

=== Distribution by group ===
Summary of political group distribution in the 4th Restoration Cortes (1886–1891)
Group	Parties and alliances	C	S	Total
PL	Liberal Party (PL)	290	112	432
PL	Constitutional Union of Cuba (UCC)	12	8	432
PL	Unconditional Spanish Party (PIE)	6	2	432
PL	Basque Dynastics (Urquijist) (DV)	1	1	432
PLC	Liberal Conservative Party (PLC)	63	27	103
PLC	Constitutional Union of Cuba (UCC)	3	5	103
PLC	Unconditional Spanish Party (PIE)	4	1	103
UR	Progressive Republican Party (PRP)	10	1	23
UR	Autonomist Liberal Party (PLA)	6	1	23
UR	Liberal Reformist Party of Puerto Rico (PLRP)	3	1	23
UR	Federal Republican Party (PRF)	1	0	23
PLR	Liberal Reformist Party (PLR)	9	4	15
PLR	Constitutional Union of Cuba (UCC)	2	0	15
PDP	Possibilist Democratic Party (PDP)	11	4	15
ID	Dynastic Left (ID)	8	2	14
ID	Unconditional Spanish Party (PIE)	2	0	14
ID	Constitutional Union of Cuba (UCC)	1	0	14
ID	Independents (INDEP)	1	0	14
CT	Traditionalist Communion (Carlist) (CT)	1	0	1
INDEP	Basque Dynastics (Urquijist) (DV)	0	1	1
ARCH	Archbishops (ARCH)	0	10	10
Total		434	180	614

== Bibliography ==
Legislation

- Ley mandando que los distritos para las elecciones de Diputados a Cortes sean los que se expresan en la división adjunta (PDF) (Law). Madrid Gazette (in Spanish). 1 January 1871.
- Decreto mandando se verifiquen en Puerto Rico las elecciones ordinarias de Senadores y Diputados a Cortes (PDF) (Decree). Madrid Gazette (in Spanish). 1 April 1871.
- Constitución de la Monarquía Española (PDF) (Constitution). Madrid Gazette (in Spanish). 30 June 1876.
- Ley electoral de Senadores (PDF) (Law). Madrid Gazette (in Spanish). 8 February 1877.
- Ley electoral de los Diputados a Cortes (PDF) (Law). Madrid Gazette (in Spanish). 28 December 1878.
- Ley dictando reglas para la elección de Senadores en las islas de Cuba y Puerto Rico (PDF) (Law). Madrid Gazette (in Spanish). 9 January 1879.
- Decreto dividiendo la isla de Cuba en distritos electorales para la elección de Diputados a Cortes (Decree). Havana Gazette (in Spanish). University of Miami. 31 January 1879.
- Ley enumerando los empleos con los cuales es compatible el cargo de Diputado a Cortes (PDF) (Law). Madrid Gazette (in Spanish). 7 March 1880.
- Real decreto determinando el número de Senadores que habrán de elegirse en cada una de las provincias con motivo de las próximas elecciones (PDF) (Royal Decree). Madrid Gazette (in Spanish). 30 June 1881.
- Ley fijando la división de la provincia de Vizcaya en distritos para la elección de Diputados a Cortes y la de aquellos en secciones (PDF) (Law). Madrid Gazette (in Spanish). 21 March 1883.
- Ley dividiendo la provincia de Guipúzcoa en distritos para la elección de Diputados a Cortes (PDF) (Law). Madrid Gazette (in Spanish). 23 June 1885.
- Real decreto declarando disueltos el Congreso de los Diputados y la parte electiva del Senado, señalando el día 10 de Mayo próximo para reunirse las Cortes, y disponiendo que las elecciones de Diputados se verifiquen el 4 de Abril, y las de Senadores el 25 del mismo (PDF) (Royal Decree). Madrid Gazette (in Spanish). 8 March 1886.

Other

- Fernández Almagro, Melchor (1943). "Las Cortes del siglo XIX y la práctica electoral" (PDF). Revista de Estudios Políticos (in Spanish) (9–10). Madrid: Centre for Political and Constitutional Studies: 383–419. ISSN 0048-7694.
- López Domínguez, José María (1976). Elecciones y partidos políticos de Puerto Rico: 1809-1898 (PDF) (Thesis) (in Spanish). Vol. 1. Puerto Rico: Complutense University of Madrid.
- Calero, Antonio María (1987). "La prerrogativa regia en la Restauración: teoría y práctica (1875-1902)" (PDF). Revista de Estudios Políticos (in Spanish) (55). Madrid: Centre for Political and Constitutional Studies: 273–315. ISSN 0048-7694.
- Dardé Morales, Carlos (1986). "Las elecciones de diputados de 1886" (PDF). Anales de la Universidad de Alicante. Historia Contemporánea (in Spanish) (5): 223–259. doi:10.14198/AnContemp.1986.5.10. ISSN 0212-5080.
- Ortega Álvarez, Luis; Santaolaya Machetti, Pablo (1996). "Evolución histórica del sistema electoral español". Revista de las Cortes Generales (in Spanish). 37. Cortes Generales: 65–107. doi:10.33426/rcg/1996/37/784. ISSN 0213-0130.
- Martorell Linares, Miguel Ángel (1997). "La crisis parlamentaria de 1913-1917. La quiebra del sistema de relaciones parlamentarias de la Restauración" (PDF). Revista de Estudios Políticos (in Spanish) (96). Madrid: Centre for Political and Constitutional Studies: 137–161. ISSN 0048-7694.
- Caballero Domínguez, Margarita (1999). "El derecho de representación: sufragio y leyes electorales" (PDF). Ayer (in Spanish) (34): 41–63.
- Martínez Ruiz, Enrique; Maqueda Abreu, Consuelo; De Diego, Emilio (1999). Atlas histórico de España. La Regencia de María Cristina (1885-1902) (in Spanish). Vol. 2. Bilbao: Ediciones KAL. pp. 109–120. ISBN 9788470903502.
- Roldán de Montaud, Inés (1999). "Política y elecciones en Cuba durante la restauración" (PDF). Revista de Estudios Políticos (in Spanish) (104): 245–287.
- Armengol i Segú, Josep; Varela Ortega, José (2001). El poder de la influencia: geografía del caciquismo en España (1875-1923) (in Spanish). Madrid: Marcial Pons. pp. 655–776. ISBN 9788425911521.
- García Muñoz, Montserrat (2002). "La documentación electoral y el fichero histórico de diputados". Revista General de Información y Documentación (in Spanish). 12 (1): 93–137. ISSN 1132-1873.
- Carreras de Odriozola, Albert; Tafunell Sambola, Xavier (2005) [1989]. Estadísticas históricas de España, siglos XIX-XX (PDF) (in Spanish). Vol. 1 (II ed.). Bilbao: Fundación BBVA. pp. 1072–1097. ISBN 84-96515-00-1. Archived from the original (PDF) on 24 September 2015.
- Martínez Relanzón, Alejandro (2017). "Political Modernization in Spain Between 1876 and 1923". Annales Universitatis Mariae Curie-Skłodowska, Sectio K. 24 (1). Madrid: Maria Curie-Skłodowska University: 145–154. doi:10.17951/k.2017.24.1.145. S2CID 159328027.
- Sánchez Ortiz, Modesto; Berástegui, Fermín (2018). Las Primeras Cámaras de la Regencia: Datos Electorales, Estadísticos y Biográficos (PDF) (in Spanish). Madrid: Forgotten Books. ISBN 9780366929764.
