= 1896 Spanish general election =

- 12 April 1896 (Congress) (Note: The Congress election in the province of Canaries was postponed to 19 April 1896.); 26 April 1896 (Senate)

All 447 seats in the Congress of Deputies and 180 (of 360) seats in the Senate 224 seats needed for a majority in the Congress of Deputies
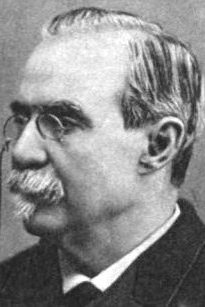

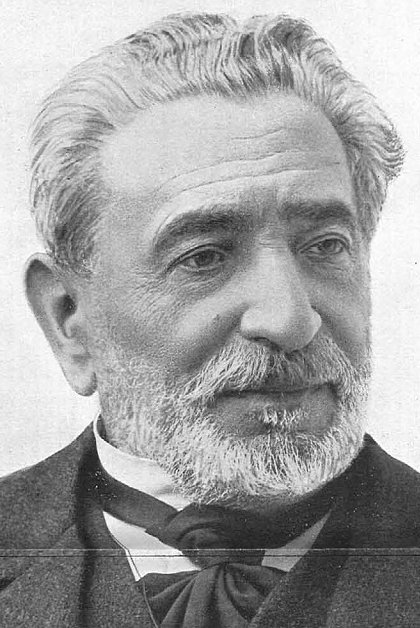

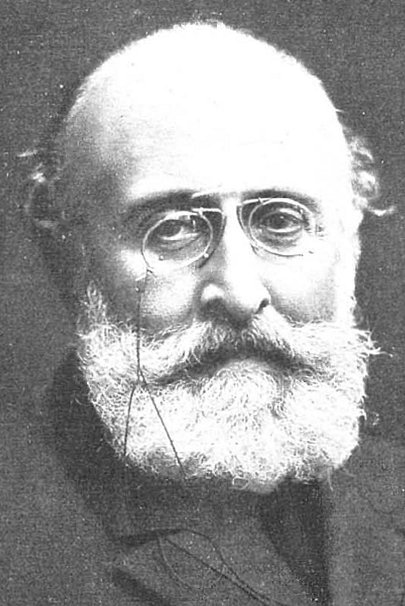

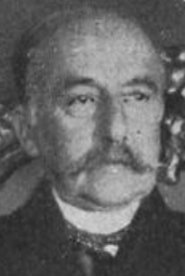

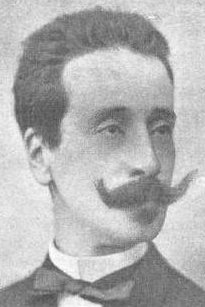
| | First party | Second party | Third party |
|---|---|---|---|
| Leader | Antonio Cánovas del Castillo | Práxedes Mateo Sagasta | Francisco Silvela |
| Party | Conservative | Liberal | Silvelist |
| Leader since | 1874 | 1880 | 1892 |
| Leader's seat | Hellín | Logroño | Piedrahíta |
| Last election | 67 D · 35 S | 298 D · 118 S | 17 D · 4 S |
| Seats won | 307 D · 117 S | 111 D · 43 S | 12 D · 2 S |
| Seat change | ▲240 D · ▲82 S | ▼187 D · ▼75 S | ▼5 D · ▼2 S |
| | Fourth party | Fifth party |
| Leader | Enrique de Aguilera y Gamboa | Ramón Nocedal |
| Party | Carlist | Integrist |
| Leader since | 1891 | 1888 |
| Leader's seat | — | Guipúzcoa (lost) |
| Last election | 8 D · 2 S | 2 D · 0 S |
| Seats won | 10 D · 2 S | 1 D · 0 S |
| Seat change | ▲2 D · 0 S | ▼1 D · 0 S |
Prime Minister before election
Antonio Cánovas del Castillo
Conservative
Prime Minister after election
Antonio Cánovas del Castillo
Conservative

A general election was held in Spain on 12 April 1896 (for the Congress of Deputies), and on 26 April 1896 (for the Senate), to elect the members of the 7th Cortes under the Spanish Constitution of 1876, during the Restoration period. All 445 seats in the Congress of Deputies—plus two special districts—were up for election, as well as 180 of 360 seats in the Senate.

Since the Pact of El Pardo, an informal system known as turno or turnismo was operated by the monarchy and the country's two main parties—the Conservatives and the Liberals—to determine in advance the outcome of elections by means of electoral fraud, often achieved through the territorial clientelistic networks of local bosses (the caciques), ensuring that both parties would have rotating periods in power. As a result, elections were often neither truly free nor fair, though they could be more competitive in the country's urban centres where caciquism was weaker.

The previous Liberal government of Práxedes Mateo Sagasta had resigned in March 1895, following the outbreak of revolution in Cuba and a period dominated by social conflict and war in Morocco. Conservative leader Antonio Cánovas del Castillo was tasked to form a new government, but the general election was delayed by over a year until their feasibility in Cuba could be ensured. The election resulted in a large majority for the Conservatives amidst the boycott of most pro-republican parties.

This would be the last election to be contested by Cánovas, as he would be assassinated while in office in August 1897 by an anarchist, Michele Angiolillo.

== Background ==
Following the Bourbon Restoration in 1874, the Spanish Constitution of 1876 enshrined Spain as a semi-constitutional monarchy, awarding the monarch—under the royal prerogative—the right of legislative initiative together with the bicameral Cortes; the capacity to veto laws passed by the legislative body; the power to appoint government members (including the prime minister); the ability to grant or deny parliamentary dissolution, the adjournment of legislative sessions and the signature of royal decrees; as well as the title of commander-in-chief of the armed forces. The monarch would play a key role in the turno system by appointing and dismissing governments, which would then organize elections to provide themselves with a parliamentary majority. This informal system allowed the two major "dynastic" political parties at the time, the Conservatives and the Liberals—characterized as oligarchic, elite parties with loose structures dominated by internal factions, each led by powerful individuals—to alternate in power by means of electoral fraud (pucherazo). This was achieved by assigning candidates to districts before the elections were held (encasillado), then arrange their victory through the links between the Ministry of Governance and the territorial clientelistic networks of provincial governors and local bosses (the caciques), excluding minor parties from the power sharing.

The 1892–1895 period of Liberal government under Práxedes Mateo Sagasta had been dominated by the situation in Cuba and Puerto Rico—with attempts from Overseas minister Antonio Maura to grant limited autonomy to the islands failing to materialize—as well as the First Melillan campaign against the Sultanate of Morocco and the persistence of social conflict (with notable incidents such as an attempted 1893 attack on Captain General of Catalonia Arsenio Martínez Campos leading to the approval of a Law of repression of anarchism in 1894). This period also saw the Gamazada, a popular uproar in Navarre to a plan by finance minister Germán Gamazo to suppress the fueros—established in the Compromise Act of 1841—that was thwarted by Gamazo's resignation in 1894.

The outbreak of revolution in Cuba in February 1895 and the subsequent Tenientada—the assault and looting of two Madrid newspapers (El Resumen and El Globo) by groups of civilians and military personnel who were upset about published opinions on an alleged reluctancy from military officers to embark to Cuba—caused the downfall of Sagasta's cabinet. In March 1895, Antonio Cánovas del Castillo of the Conservative Party was entrusted with the formation of a new government, but electoral preparations were delayed until newly-appointed Cuba governor Valeriano Weyler could ensure the feasibility of holding elections in the colony.

== Overview ==
Under the 1876 Constitution, the Spanish Cortes were conceived as "co-legislative bodies", forming a nearly perfect bicameral system. Both the Congress of Deputies and the Senate exercised legislative, oversight and budgetary functions, sharing almost equal powers, except in budget laws (taxation and public credit)—whose first reading corresponded to Congress—and in impeachment processes against government ministers, where Congress handled indictment and the Senate the trial.

=== Date ===
The term of each chamber of the Cortes—the Congress and one-half of the elective part of the Senate—expired five years from the date of their previous election, unless they were dissolved earlier. The previous elections were held on 5 March 1893 for the Congress and on 19 March 1893 for the Senate, which meant that the chambers' terms would have expired on 5 and 19 March 1898, respectively.

The monarch had the prerogative to dissolve both chambers at any given time—either jointly or separately—and call a snap election. There was no constitutional requirement for concurrent elections to the Congress and the Senate, nor for the elective part of the Senate to be renewed in its entirety except in the case that a full dissolution was agreed by the monarch. Still, there was only one case of a separate election (for the Senate in 1877) and no half-Senate elections taking place under the 1876 Constitution.

The Cortes were officially dissolved on 28 February 1896, with the corresponding decree setting election day for 12 April (Congress) and 26 April 1893 (Senate) and scheduling for both chambers to reconvene on 11 May.

=== Electoral system ===
Voting for the Congress of Deputies was based on universal manhood suffrage, comprising all Spanish national males over 25 years of age with full civil rights, provided they had two years of residence in a Spanish municipality and were not enlisted ranks in active duty. In the Spanish West Indies (Cuba and Puerto Rico), voting was based on censitary suffrage, comprising Spanish males of voting age who met either of the following:

- Being taxpayers with a minimum quota of $5 (in Cuba) or $10 (in Puerto Rico) in property or corporate taxes (paid by the time of enrollment);
- Holding specific positions (such as full academics in the royal academies, cathedral chapter members and parish priests, active public employees with a salary of $100 and two years of service, retired public employees, general officers, awarded painters or sculptors, senior court officials and certified teachers);
- Meeting the two-year residence requirement while proving a professional qualification.

Additional restrictions excluded those deprived of political rights or barred from public office by a final sentence, criminally imprisoned or convicted, legally incapacitated, bankrupt, public debtors, and homeless.

The Congress of Deputies had one seat per 50,000 inhabitants. Of these, those corresponding to larger urban areas were elected in multi-member constituencies using partial block voting: voters in constituencies electing eight seats or more could choose up to three candidates less than the number of seats at stake; in those with between four and eight seats, up to two less; and in those with between one and four seats, up to one less. The remaining seats were elected in single-member districts by plurality voting and distributed among the provinces of Spain according to population. Additionally, universities, economic societies of Friends of the Country and officially organized chambers of commerce, industry and agriculture, had one seat per 5,000 registered voters. Cuba and Puerto Rico were allocated 30 and 16 seats, respectively. (Note: In Cuba and Puerto Rico, voters in constituencies electing eight seats could choose up to six candidates; in those with seven seats, up to five; in those with six seats, up to four; in those with four or five seats, up to three; in those with three seats, up to two; and in single-member districts, one.)

As a result of the aforementioned allocation, 331 single-member districts (including two special districts) were established, and each Congress multi-member constituency (a total of 34, electing 116 seats) was entitled the following seats:

| Seats | Constituencies |
|---|---|
| 8 | Madrid |
| 6 | Havana |
| 5 | Barcelona, Palma |
| 4 | Santa Clara, Seville |
| 3 | Alicante, Almería, Badajoz, Burgos, Cádiz, Cartagena, Córdoba, Granada, Jaén, Jerez de la Frontera, La Coruña, Lugo, Málaga, Matanzas, Mayagüez, Murcia, Oviedo, Pamplona, Pinar del Río, Ponce, San Juan Bautista, Santa Cruz de Tenerife, Santander, Santiago de Cuba, Tarragona, Valencia, Valladolid, Zaragoza |

Voting for the elective part of the Senate was also based on censitary suffrage, comprising Spanish male householders of voting age, residing in a Spanish municipality, with full political and civil rights, who met either of the following:

- Being qualified electors (such as archbishops, bishops and cathedral chapter members, in the archdioceses; full academics, in the royal academies; university authorities and professors, in the universities; or provincial deputies);
- Being elected as delegates (either by members with three years of seniority (in the economic societies of Friends of the Country; or by major taxpayers for direct taxes and local authorities, in the local councils).

180 Senate seats were elected using indirect, two-round majority voting. Delegates chosen by local councils—each of which was assigned an initial minimum of one delegate, with one additional delegate for every six councillors—voted for senators together with provincial deputies. The provinces of Álava, Albacete, Ávila, Biscay, Cuenca, Guadalajara, Guipúzcoa, Huelva, Logroño, Matanzas, Palencia, Pinar del Río, Puerto Príncipe, Santa Clara, Santander, Santiago de Cuba, Segovia, Soria, Teruel, Valladolid and Zamora were allocated two seats each, and the rest three each, for a total of 147. The remaining 33 seats were allocated to special institutional districts (one each), including major archdioceses, royal academies, universities, and economic societies, (Note: The following were considered as the major districts in each category: Archdioceses: Burgos, Granada, Santiago de Compostela, Santiago de Cuba, Seville, Tarragona, Toledo, Valencia, Valladolid, and Zaragoza.; Royal academies: Spanish; History; Fine Arts of San Fernando; Exact, Physical and Natural Sciences; Moral and Political Sciences; and Medicine.; Universities: Madrid, Barcelona, Granada, Havana, Oviedo, Salamanca, Santiago, Seville, Valencia, Valladolid, and Zaragoza.; Economic societies of Friends of the Country: Madrid, Barcelona, Havana–Puerto Rico, León, Seville, and Valencia.) each elected by their own qualified electors or delegates. Another 180 seats consisted of senators in their own right (such as the monarch's offspring and the heir apparent once coming of age (16), grandees of Spain with an income of Pts 60,000, certain general officers—captain generals and admirals—the Patriarch of the Indies and archbishops, and the heads of higher courts and state institutions (Note: These comprised the Council of State, the Supreme Court, the Court of Auditors and the Supreme Council of War and Navy.) after two years of service), as well as senators for life directly appointed by the monarch.

The law provided for by-elections to fill vacant seats during the legislative term. At least two vacancies were required to trigger a by-election in Congress multi-member constituencies.

== Candidates ==
=== Nomination rules ===
For the Congress, secular Spanish males of voting age, with full civil rights, could run for election. Causes of ineligibility applied to those excluded from voting or meeting any of the incompatibility rules for deputies, as well as to:

- Public contractors, within their relevant territories;
- Holders of a number of territorial posts (such as government-appointed positions, not including government ministers and Central Administration employees; local and provincial employees; and provincial deputation members), within their areas of jurisdiction, during their term of office and up to one year afterwards.

For the Senate, eligibility was limited to Spanish males over 35 years of age not under criminal prosecution, disfranchisement nor asset seizure, and who either qualified as senators in their own right or belonged (or had belonged) to certain categories:

- Provided an income of Pts 7,500: the presidents of the Senate and the Congress; deputies serving in three different congresses or eight terms; government ministers; bishops; grandees of Spain not eligible as senators in their own right; and various senior officials after two years of service (such as certain general officers—lieutenant generals and vice admirals—and members of higher courts and state institutions); heads of diplomatic missions abroad (ambassadors after two years, and plenipotentiaries after four); heads and full academics in the royal academies; chief engineers; and full professors with four years of service;
- Provided an income of Pts 20,000 or being taxpayers with a minimum quota of Pts 4,000 in direct taxes (paid two years in advance): Spanish nobility; and former deputies, provincial deputies or mayors in provincial capitals or towns over 20,000;
- Having served as senators before the promulgation of the 1876 Constitution.

Other ineligibility provisions for the Senate also applied to a number of territorial officials within their areas of jurisdiction, during their term of office and up to three months afterwards; public contractors; tax collectors; and public debtors.

Incompatibility rules barred representing multiple constituencies simultaneously, as well as combining:

- The role of senator with other legislative roles (deputy, senator and local councillor, except those in Madrid; and provincial deputies within their respective provinces); or with any public post not explicitly permitted under Senate eligibility requirements;
- The role of deputy with any other civil, military or judicial post, with exceptions—and as many as 40 deputies allowed to simultaneously benefit from these—including a number of specific posts based in Madrid, such as any of the aforementioned ones (provided a public salary of Pts 12,500); senior court officials; university authorities and professors; chief engineers; and general officers.

== Results ==
=== Congress of Deputies ===
← Summary of the 12 April 1896 Congress of Deputies election results →
| Parties and alliances | Popular vote | | Seats |
| Parties and alliances | Votes | % | Seats |
|---|---|---|---|
| Liberal Conservative Party (PLC) | | | 307 |
| Liberal Party (PL) | | | 111 |
| Silvelist Party (PS) | | | 12 |
| Traditionalist Communion (Carlist) (CT) | | | 10 |
| Integrist Party (PI) | | | 1 |
| Independents (INDEP) | | | 6 |
| Total | | | 447 |
| Votes cast / turnout | | | |
| Abstentions | | | |
| Registered voters | | | |

Seats
| PLC | 68.68% |
| PL | 24.83% |
| PS | 2.68% |
| CT | 2.24% |
| PI | 0.22% |
| INDEP | 1.34% |

=== Senate ===
← Summary of the 26 April 1896 Senate of Spain election results →
| Parties and alliances | Seats |
|---|---|
| Liberal Conservative Party (PLC) | 117 |
| Liberal Party (PL) | 43 |
| Silvelist Party (PS) | 2 |
| Traditionalist Communion (Carlist) (CT) | 2 |
| Independents (INDEP) | 6 |
| Archbishops (ARCH) | 10 |
| Total elective seats | 180 |

Seats
| PLC | 65.00% |
| PL | 23.89% |
| PS | 1.11% |
| CT | 1.11% |
| INDEP | 3.33% |
| ARCH | 5.56% |

=== Maps ===
Election results by constituency (Congress).

Election results by constituency (Senate).

=== Distribution by group ===
Summary of political group distribution in the 7th Restoration Cortes (1896–1898)
| Group | Parties and alliances | C | S | Total |
|---|---|---|---|---|
| PLC | Liberal Conservative Party (PLC) | 278 | 104 | 424 |
| PLC | Constitutional Union of Cuba (UCC) | 17 | 10 | 424 |
| PLC | Unconditional Spanish Party (PIE) | 10 | 2 | 424 |
| PLC | Basque Dynastics (Urquijist) (DV) | 1 | 1 | 424 |
| PLC | Independents (INDEP) | 1 | 0 | 424 |
| PL | Liberal Party (PL) | 95 | 39 | 154 |
| PL | Constitutional Union of Cuba (UCC) | 11 | 3 | 154 |
| PL | Unconditional Spanish Party (PIE) | 5 | 1 | 154 |
| PS | Silvelist Party (PS) | 11 | 2 | 14 |
| PS | Constitutional Union of Cuba (UCC) | 1 | 0 | 14 |
| CT | Traditionalist Communion (Carlist) (CT) | 10 | 2 | 12 |
| PI | Integrist Party (PI) | 1 | 0 | 1 |
| INDEP | Independent Possibilists (P.IND) | 3 | 1 | 12 |
| INDEP | Independents (INDEP) | 1 | 2 | 12 |
| INDEP | Autonomist Liberal Party (PLA) | 0 | 2 | 12 |
| INDEP | Constitutional Union of Cuba (UCC) | 1 | 0 | 12 |
| INDEP | Independent Catholics (CAT) | 1 | 0 | 12 |
| INDEP | Basque Dynastics (Urquijist) (DV) | 0 | 1 | 12 |
| ARCH | Archbishops (ARCH) | 0 | 10 | 10 |
| Total | | 447 | 180 | 627 |

== Bibliography ==
Legislation

- Ley mandando que los distritos para las elecciones de Diputados a Cortes sean los que se expresan en la división adjunta (PDF) (Law). Madrid Gazette (in Spanish). 1 January 1871.
- Decreto mandando se verifiquen en Puerto Rico las elecciones ordinarias de Senadores y Diputados a Cortes (PDF) (Decree). Madrid Gazette (in Spanish). 1 April 1871.
- Constitución de la Monarquía Española (PDF) (Constitution). Madrid Gazette (in Spanish). 30 June 1876.
- Ley electoral de Senadores (PDF) (Law). Madrid Gazette (in Spanish). 8 February 1877.
- Ley electoral de los Diputados a Cortes (PDF) (Law). Madrid Gazette (in Spanish). 28 December 1878.
- Ley dictando reglas para la elección de Senadores en las islas de Cuba y Puerto Rico (PDF) (Law). Madrid Gazette (in Spanish). 9 January 1879.
- Ley enumerando los empleos con los cuales es compatible el cargo de Diputado a Cortes (PDF) (Law). Madrid Gazette (in Spanish). 7 March 1880.
- Real decreto determinando el número de Senadores que habrán de elegirse en cada una de las provincias con motivo de las próximas elecciones (PDF) (Royal Decree). Madrid Gazette (in Spanish). 30 June 1881.
- Ley dividiendo la provincia de Guipúzcoa en distritos para la elección de Diputados a Cortes (PDF) (Law). Madrid Gazette (in Spanish). 23 June 1885.
- Ley dividiendo el distrito electoral de Tarrasa en dos, que se denominarán de Tarrasa y de Sabadell (PDF) (Law). Madrid Gazette (in Spanish). 18 January 1887.
- Ley reformando el art. 4º. de la ley de Incompatibilidades (PDF) (Law). Madrid Gazette (in Spanish). 31 July 1887.
- Ley fijando la división de la provincia de Álava en distritos electorales para Diputados a Cortes (PDF) (Law). Madrid Gazette (in Spanish). 10 July 1888.
- Ley electoral para Diputados a Cortes (PDF) (Law). Madrid Gazette (in Spanish). 26 June 1890.
- Real decreto disponiendo que mientras no se publique nueva ley Electoral rija en la isla de Cuba la división en circunscripciones y distritos para la elección de Diputados a Cortes aprobada en el Congreso en la forma que se expresa (PDF) (Royal Decree). Madrid Gazette (in Spanish). 18 December 1890.
- Real decreto disponiendo la forma en que se han de verificar las elecciones de Diputados a Cortes en las islas de Cuba y Puerto Rico (PDF) (Royal Decree). Madrid Gazette (in Spanish). 27 December 1892.
- Real decreto declarando subsistente la división territorial para elecciones de Diputados a Cortes en las islas de Cuba y Puerto Rico, establecida por Real decreto de 18 de Diciembre de 1890 (PDF) (Royal Decree). Madrid Gazette (in Spanish). 27 December 1892.
- Ley disponiendo que las primeras y sucesivas elecciones que se verifiquen en la provincia de Zamora se dividirá en siete distritos en la forma que se expresa (PDF) (Law). Madrid Gazette (in Spanish). 18 June 1895.
- Leyes aprobando la división electoral de las provincias de León y Vizcaya (PDF) (Law). Madrid Gazette (in Spanish). 2 August 1895.
- Real decreto declarando disueltos el Congreso de los Diputados y la parte electiva del Senado; disponiendo que las Cortes se reúnan en Madrid el 11 de Mayo próximo, y que las elecciones de Diputados se verifiquen el 12 de Abril y las de Senadores el 26 del mismo (PDF) (Royal Decree). Madrid Gazette (in Spanish). 28 February 1896.
- Real decreto aplazando las elecciones de Diputados en Canarias hasta el 19 del corriente (PDF) (Royal Decree). Madrid Gazette (in Spanish). 12 April 1896.

Other

- Fernández Almagro, Melchor (1943). "Las Cortes del siglo XIX y la práctica electoral" (PDF). Revista de Estudios Políticos (in Spanish) (9–10). Madrid: Centre for Political and Constitutional Studies: 383–419. ISSN 0048-7694.
- López Domínguez, José María (1976). Elecciones y partidos políticos de Puerto Rico: 1809-1898 (PDF) (Thesis) (in Spanish). Vol. 1. Puerto Rico: Complutense University of Madrid.
- Calero, Antonio María (1987). "La prerrogativa regia en la Restauración: teoría y práctica (1875-1902)" (PDF). Revista de Estudios Políticos (in Spanish) (55). Madrid: Centre for Political and Constitutional Studies: 273–315. ISSN 0048-7694.
- Núñez Florencio, Rafael (1993). "Los republicanos españoles ante el problema colonial: La cuestión cubana (1895-98)". Revista de Indias (in Spanish). 53 (198): 545–561. doi:10.3989/revindias.1993.i198.1146. ISSN 0034-8341.
- Ortega Álvarez, Luis; Santaolaya Machetti, Pablo (1996). "Evolución histórica del sistema electoral español". Revista de las Cortes Generales (in Spanish). 37. Cortes Generales: 65–107. doi:10.33426/rcg/1996/37/784. ISSN 0213-0130.
- Martorell Linares, Miguel Ángel (1997). "La crisis parlamentaria de 1913-1917. La quiebra del sistema de relaciones parlamentarias de la Restauración" (PDF). Revista de Estudios Políticos (in Spanish) (96). Madrid: Centre for Political and Constitutional Studies: 137–161. ISSN 0048-7694.
- Martínez Ruiz, Enrique; Maqueda Abreu, Consuelo; De Diego, Emilio (1999). Atlas histórico de España. La Regencia de María Cristina (1885-1902) (in Spanish). Vol. 2. Bilbao: Ediciones KAL. pp. 109–120. ISBN 9788470903502.
- Roldán de Montaud, Inés (1999). "Política y elecciones en Cuba durante la restauración" (PDF). Revista de Estudios Políticos (in Spanish) (104): 245–287.
- Armengol i Segú, Josep; Varela Ortega, José (2001). El poder de la influencia: geografía del caciquismo en España (1875-1923) (in Spanish). Madrid: Marcial Pons. pp. 655–776. ISBN 9788425911521.
- García Muñoz, Montserrat (2002). "La documentación electoral y el fichero histórico de diputados". Revista General de Información y Documentación (in Spanish). 12 (1): 93–137. ISSN 1132-1873.
- Carreras de Odriozola, Albert; Tafunell Sambola, Xavier (2005) [1989]. Estadísticas históricas de España, siglos XIX-XX (PDF) (in Spanish). Vol. 1 (II ed.). Bilbao: Fundación BBVA. pp. 1072–1097. ISBN 84-96515-00-1. Archived from the original (PDF) on 24 September 2015.
- Tone, John Lawrence (2006). "The Monster and the Assassin". War and Genocide in Cuba, 1895-1898. University of North Carolina Press. pp. 225–239. ISBN 9780807830062.
- Martínez Relanzón, Alejandro (2017). "Political Modernization in Spain Between 1876 and 1923". Annales Universitatis Mariae Curie-Skłodowska, Sectio K. 24 (1). Madrid: Maria Curie-Skłodowska University: 145–154. doi:10.17951/k.2017.24.1.145. S2CID 159328027.
