= Republican Constitutional Union =

Republican Constitutional Union Unión Constitucional Republicana
- Leader: José de Carvajal y Hué
- Founded: 1893
- Dissolved: 1895
- Split from: Possibilist Democratic Party
- Merged into: National Republican Party
- Ideology: Progressivism; Republicanism

The Republican Constitutional Union (Spanish: Unión Constitucional Republicana, UCR) was a Spanish political party created in 1893 by dissidents from the Possibilist Democratic Party (PDP) led by José de Carvajal y Hué, who opposed Emilio Castelar's decision to dissolve the PDP and join the Liberal Party following the 1893 Spanish general election. The party later joined with elements from the Progressive Republican Party (PRP) into the National Republican Party (PRN) in 1895.

== See also ==
- Liberalism and radicalism in Spain
