= José María Esquerdo =

Spanish psychiatrist (1842–1912)

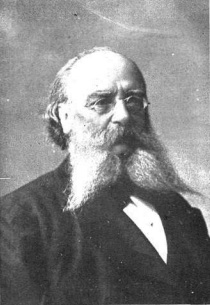

Member of the Congress of Deputies
- In office 18 May 1910 – 30 January 1912
- Constituency: Madrid
- In office 2 April 1893 – 28 February 1895
- Constituency: Madrid

Madrid municipal councillor

Personal details
- Born: 2 February 1842 La Vila Joiosa, Spain
- Died: 30 January 1912 (aged 69) Madrid, Spain
- Party: Progressive Republican Party

José María Esquerdo Zaragoza (2 February 1842 – 30 January 1912) was a Spanish psychiatrist, physician, and Republican politician. He was the leader of the Progressive Republican Party from 1895 until his death in 1912. He is noted as a pioneer in the introduction of modern psychiatric treatments in Spain.

== Biography ==
José María Esquerdo Zaragoza was born in Villajoyosa, Alicante on 2 February 1842. He was the son of farm workers. He completed his medical training at the San Carlos Hospital of Madrid, though it is unclear whether he began his education there or at the University of Valencia. After completing his studies, he relocated to Talavera de la Reina. Following the 1868 Glorious Revolution, he became the chair of pathology and director of the clinic of mental diseases at the General Hospital of Madrid. In 1872, Esquerdo volunteered to treat those wounded during the Third Carlist War.

In May 1877, he founded a psychiatric hospital in Carabanchel.

Esquerdo unsuccessfully ran as a candidate for the Congress of Deputies in the February 1891 general election, the first one since the restoration of universal male suffrage in Spain. Splitting the vote with a fellow Progressive Republican, Esquerdo's bid was ultimately unsuccessful. However, he shortly after won a seat as a Madrid municipal councillor during the May municipal election, representing the district of Hospital.

Esquerdo ran again as a candidate for Madrid to the Congress of Deputies as part of a joint Republican ticket named "Unión Republicana" at the 1893 general election. This time, he won the seat with a plurality of the vote.

Following the death of Manuel Ruiz Zorrilla in 1895, Esquerdo became the leader of the Progressive Republican Party. His leadership in the party, however, was not accepted by those represented by Antonio Catena, founder of El País (an important party newspaper). The party thus lost the newspaper's support and was forced to replace it with the newly-created El Progreso in 1897, edited by Alejandro Lerroux.

Esquerdo vied as the Republican–Socialist Conjunction (CRS) candidate for Madrid at the 1910 general election and again earned a seat at the Congress of Deputies. He received 41,939 votes and ranked as the second-most voted candidate in the capital, after his fellow Republican Benito Pérez Galdós. He participated in the Central Committee of the CRS meetings, where he grew closer to the faction favoring collaboration with the government, which was represented by Melquíades Álvarez and Gumersindo de Azcárate. He died on 30 January 1912 in his Madrid home. The Progressive Republican Party was dissolved soon after his death.
