= National Republican Party (Spain) =

National Republican Party Partido Republicano Nacional
- Leader: José Tomás Muro
- Founded: 1895
- Dissolved: 1897
- Preceded by: UCR
- Merged into: Republican Fusion
- Ideology: Progressivism; Republicanism

The National Republican Party (Spanish: Partido Republicano Nacional, PRN) was a Spanish political party created in 1895 by supporters of José Tomás Muro, who lost his leadership bid for the Progressive Republican Party to José María Esquerdo, and the Republican Constitutional Union. In 1897 it merged into the wider Republican Fusion alliance.
