= Republican Fusion =

Republican Fusion Fusión Republicana
- Founded: 1886
- Dissolved: 1903
- Merged into: UR
- Ideology: Republicanism; Progressivism
- Political position: Centre-left to left-wing

The Republican Fusion (Spanish: Fusión Republicana, FR), also previously referred to as Republican Union (Spanish: Unión Republicana, UR) and Republican Coalition (Spanish: Coalición Republicana, CR), was a Spanish electoral alliance initially created for the 1886 Spanish general election and rearranged for the elections of 1893, 1898, 1899 and, within the wider Republican Coalition, also for the 1901 election.

== Composition ==
Republican Union (1886–1889)

Party
Progressive Republican Party (PRP)
Federal Democratic Republican Party (PRDF)

Republican Coalition (1891–1893)

Party
Possibilist Democratic Party (PDP)
Federal Democratic Republican Party (PRDF)
Centralist Republican Party (PRC)

Republican Union (1893–1897)

Party
Progressive Republican Party (PRP)
Federal Democratic Republican Party (PRDF)
Centralist Republican Party (PRC)

Republican Fusion (1897–1903)

Party
National Republican Party (PRN)
Centralist Republican Party (PRC)

== Bibliography ==
- De Miguel Salanova, Santiago (2017). Paris-Sorbonne University (ed.). "Cuestión de unión y disciplina. El triunfo republicano en las elecciones municipales de Madrid de 1891" (PDF). Cuadernos Republicanos (94): 11–62.
- Serrano Lahoz, Manuel (2020). Los partidos republicanos durante la Restauración (1874-1931) (PDF) (BA thesis) (in Spanish). University of Zaragoza.

== See also ==
- Liberalism and radicalism in Spain
