= Turno =

1881–1923 Spanish informal political system

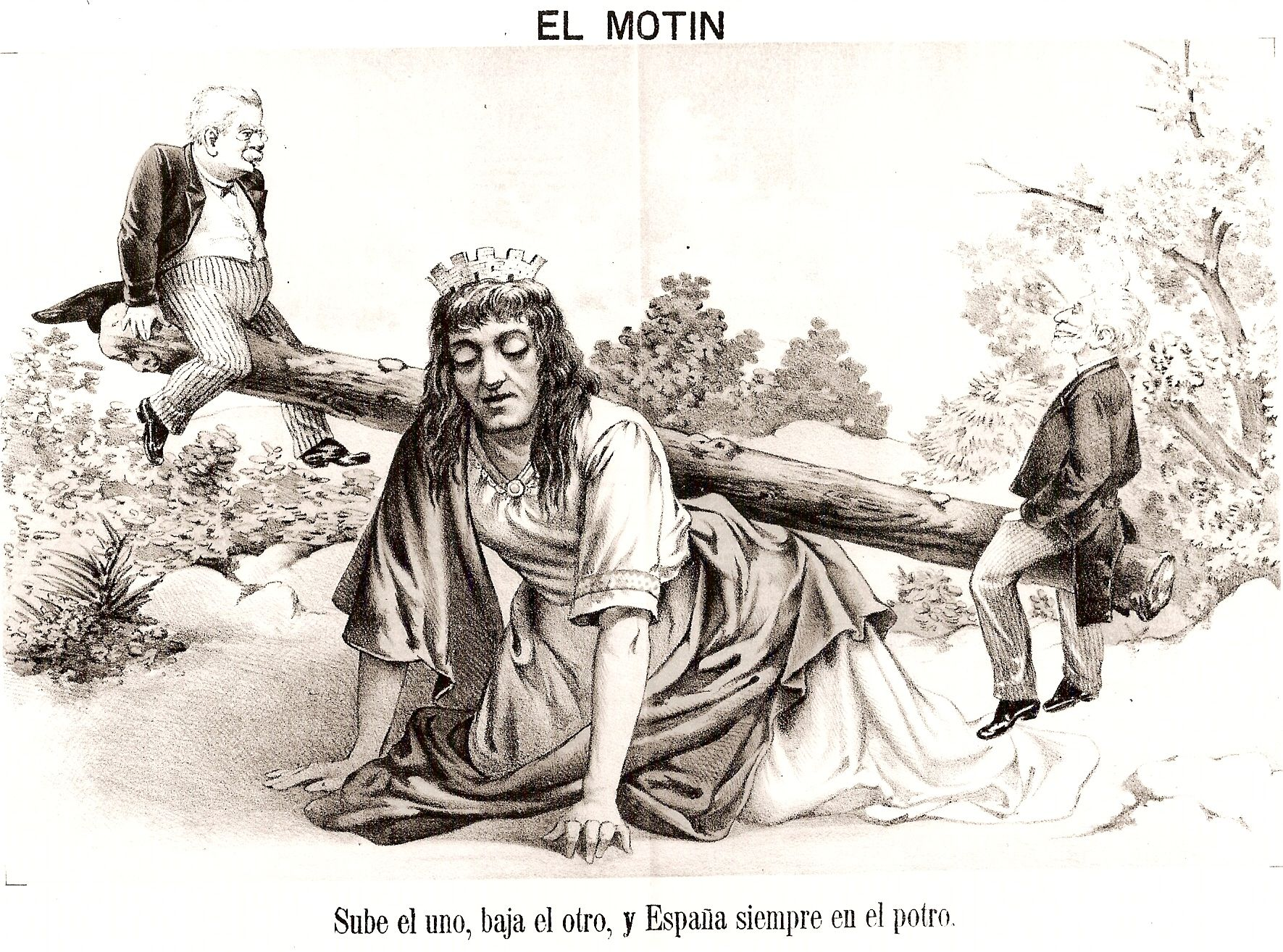
Cartoon in the satirical magazine El Motín depicting Cánovas and Sagasta see-sawing up and down on the back of Spain.

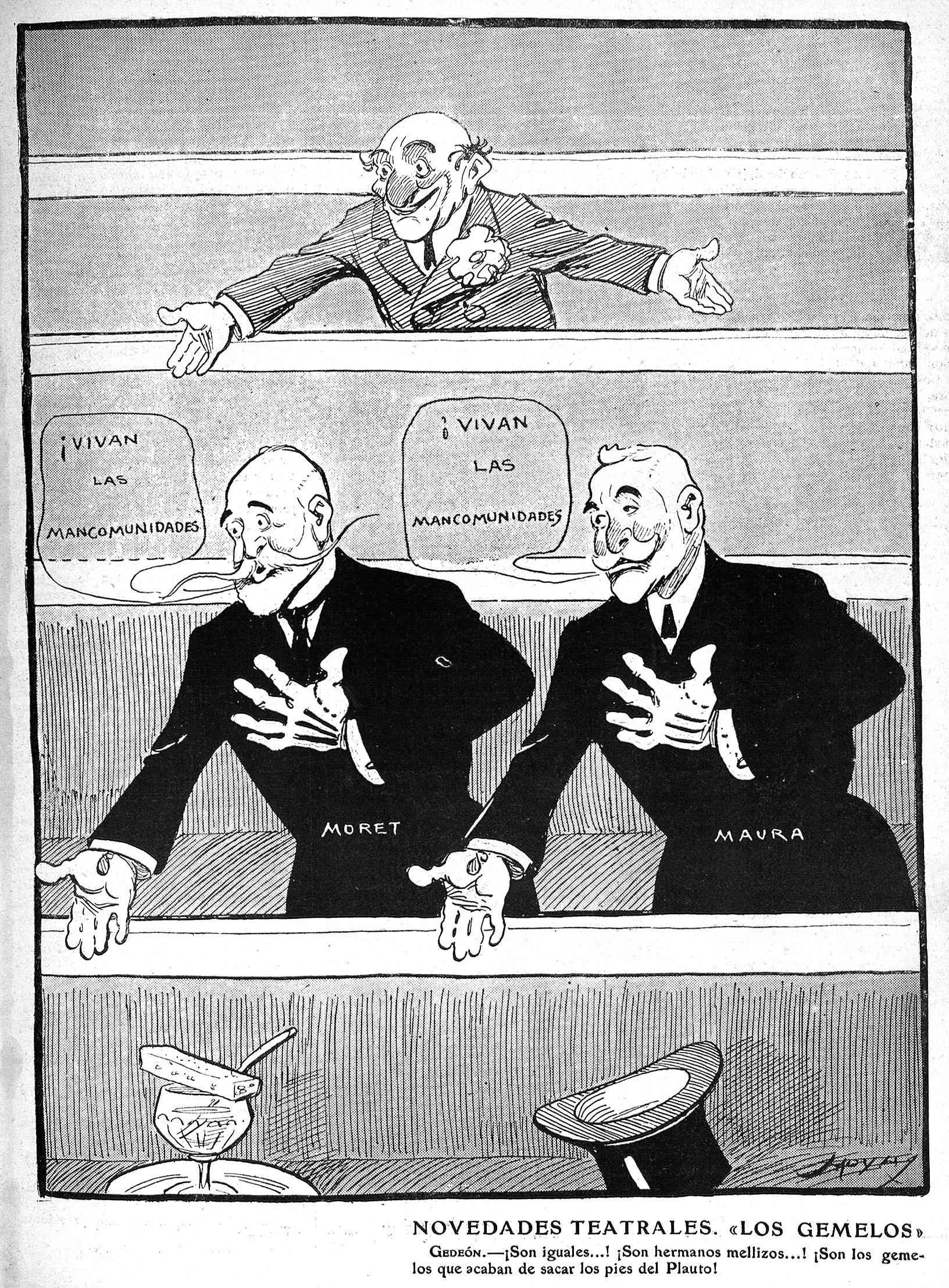
New Theatre "The Twins" from the Spanish magazine Gedeón, 1909.

In Spanish politics, the turnismo, turno pacífico or simply turno (Spanish for "turn" or "shift") refers to an informal two-party system of government within the constitutional monarchy of the Restoration. It consisted of the alternation in government of the two dynastic parties (the Conservative and the Liberal parties) through systematic electoral fraud which ensured that the party that called the elections always won.

The system was in place from 1879, the first elections held under the Restoration, until 1918, when it began to break down in response to public influence during World War I, and was ultimately abandoned after the election of 1923 and coup d'état of Miguel Primo de Rivera.

== Background ==
Under the constitutional monarchy of the Bourbon Restoration, government formation required the support of the Crown, and elections were called only in response to a political crisis or the erosion of power of the ruling party. Only two major political parties governed Spain under the Restoration: the Liberal Conservative Party, representing the "right" of the system, and the Liberal Fusionist Party, representing its "left".

The Conservative Party was led by Antonio Cánovas del Castillo, the architect of turnismo, and the Liberal Party was led by Práxedes Mateo Sagasta. The two men divided between them all of the political factions which supported the constitutional monarchy, excluding Carlists and republicans, who both rejected the political system, and socialists and anarchists, who rejected the principles of liberty and property on which Spanish bourgeois society was based.

The first alternation took place in February 1881, when the Liberal Party was called to power after six years of conservative government. In this instance, the transfer of power came at the behest of Alfonso XII, without consultation with Cánovas and against his presumed wishes. According to historian José Ramón Milán García, "its relevance did not escape its protagonists, aware that the monarch's initiative opened the doors to overcoming the entrenched confrontation between left-wing liberalism and the Bourbon dynasty, and therefore the Cainite struggles sustained for decades between the various houses of Spanish liberalism." Historian Carlos Dardé noted that the 1881 election made clear "that the ultimate interpreter of the state of affairs, and the one who had the power to make decisions―over and above the parliamentary majorities and the president of the government―was the monarch."

In response to the 1881 transfer of power, Cánovas formulated a system of rules "that both parties would have to respect in order to avoid falling again into the danger of royal whims. [...] The first thing he saw clearly was the need to control the royal prerogative, to standardize it and give it fixed criteria, far from personal criteria; to achieve a balance between royal and parliamentary power, for which party leaders were going to be the arbiters." In November 1885, following the death of the king and during the brief regency of the pregnant queen Maria Christina of Austria, Cánovas resigned as prime minister and advised Maria Christina to appoint Sagasta as prime minister. Cánovas then met with Sagasta and General Arsenio Martínez Campos to communicate his decision. At the meeting, Cánovas and Sagasta informally agreed to alternate power automatically over the following years, an agreement which has become commonly known as the "Pact of El Pardo". The new system departed from the traditional Spanish custom from the time of Isabella II, in which moderates and conservatives held a monopoly on parliamentary power, leaving progressives only the pronunciamiento to achieve power through force.

According to Ángeles Lario, the Pact of El Pardo "turned the two major parties into the true directors of political life, consensually controlling the royal prerogative upwards and the construction of the necessary parliamentary majorities downward [through electoral fraud], thus defining the life of this important period of [Spanish] liberalism and at the same time being the origin of its most serious limitations."

== Operation ==
The turno followed a series of steps:

- The Crown called one of the two major parties to govern. If the Liberal Party was in power, the Crown called the Conservative Party, and vice versa. In other words, the first step was to secure the Crown's support.
- Because the Restoration regime was premised on a parliamentary system, it was essential that the new government have the support of the Cortes Generales. To achieve this, the Crown dissolved the Cortes and called new elections.
- The new elections were manipulated through encasillado and the caciquismo system, by which the minister of the interior, provincial civil governors, and local bosses would instruct their clients to vote to ensure that the party which had entered power would obtain a majority. Thus, changes of government occurred before elections, and no government lost an election it called.

== Election results under turnismo ==
Spanish general election results, 1879–1923
Date	Results (seats)		Party in government	Monarch
Date	Government	Opposition	Party in government	Monarch
20 April 1879	293	99	Conservative Party	Alfonso XII
20 August 1881	297	95	Liberal Party	Alfonso XII
27 April 1884	318	73	Conservative Party	Alfonso XII
4 April 1886	278	117	Liberal Party	Alfonso XIII (regency)
1 February 1891	262	139	Conservative Party	Alfonso XIII (regency)
5 March 1893	281	120	Liberal Party	Alfonso XIII (regency)
12 April 1896	284	117	Conservative Party	Alfonso XIII (regency)
27 March 1898	272	129	Liberal Party	Alfonso XIII (regency)
16 April 1899	243	159	Conservative Party	Alfonso XIII (regency)
19 May 1901	260	142	Liberal Party	Alfonso XIII (regency)
26 April 1903	232	171	Conservative Party	Alfonso XIII
10 September 1905	228	176	Liberal Party	Alfonso XIII
21 April 1907	250	154	Conservative Party	Alfonso XIII
8 May 1910	215	189	Liberal Party	Alfonso XIII
8 March 1914	221	187	Conservative Party	Alfonso XIII
9 April 1916	233	176	Liberal Party	Alfonso XIII
24 February 1918	349	59	Liberal Party	Alfonso XIII
1 June 1919	198	211	Conservative Party	Alfonso XIII
19 December 1920	224	185	Conservative Party	Alfonso XIII
29 April 1923	222	187	Liberal Party	Alfonso XIII

== Cessation ==
Despite being modelled on the United Kingdom system of parliamentary democracy, the Spanish system under turismo lacked responsiveness to popular opinion. Growing opposition to the system was first apparent after Spain's defeat in the Spanish–American War, and a period of grave instability began in 1918 and 1919. Between 1920 and 1923, a serious attempt was made to reconstruct the turno, but it was brought to an end by the military coup d'état of Miguel Primo de Rivera in September 1923.

== See also ==
- Duopoly
- National Front (Colombia)
- Rotativismo, a similar system in operation in Portugal
- Two-party system

== Bibliography ==
- Dardé, Carlos (1996). "La Restauración, 1875-1902. Alfonso XII y la regencia de María Cristina". Historia 16-Temas de Hoy. Madrid. ISBN 84-7679-317-0.
- — (2021). Alfonso XII. Un rey liberal. Biografía breve. Madrid: Ediciones 19. ISBN 978-84-17280-70-3.
- Fernández Sarasola, Ignacio (2006). "La idea de partido político en la España del siglo XX". Revista Española de Derecho Constitucional (77): 77–107. ISSN 0211-5743.
- Jover, José María (1981). "La época de la Restauración. Panorama político-social, 1875-1902". Revolución burguesa, oligarquía y constitucionalismo (1834-1923). Vol. VIII de la Historia de España, dirigida por Manuel Tuñón de Lara. Barcelona: Labor. pp. 269-406. ISBN 84-335-9428-1.
- Lario, Ángeles (2003). "Alfonso XII. El rey que quiso ser constitucional" (PDF). Ayer (52). Dossier: ‘’La política en el reinado de Alfonso XII’’, Carlos Dardé, editor: 15–38. Archived from the original (PDF) on 2024-10-10.
- Milán García, José Ramón (2000). "La revolución entra en palacio. El liberalismo dinástico de Sagasta (1875-1903)". Berceo (139): 93–122. ISSN 0210-8550.
- — (2003). Los liberales en el reinado de Alfonso XII: el difícil arte de aprender de los fracasos (PDF). Dossier: ‘’La política en el reinado de Alfonso XII’’, Carlos Dardé, editor. Ayer. pp. 91–116. Archived from the original (PDF) on 2023-02-10.
- Romero Salvador, Carmelo (2021). Caciques y caciquismo en España (1834-2020). Prólogo de Ramón Villares. Madrid: Los books de la Catarata. ISBN 978-84-1352-212-8.
- Suárez Cortina, Manuel (2006). La España Liberal (1868-1917). Política y sociedad. Vol. 27 de la Historia de España 3er. Milenio, dirigida por Elena Hernández Sandoica. Madrid: Síntesis. ISBN 84-9756-415-4.
- Varela Ortega, José (2001). Los amigos políticos. Partidos, elecciones y caciquismo en la Restauración (1875-1900). Prólogo de Raymond Carr. Madrid: Marcial Pons. ISBN 84-7846-993-1.
- Villares, Ramón (2009). "Alfonso XII y Regencia. 1875-1902". In Ramón Villares; Javier Moreno Luzón (eds.). Restauración y Dictadura. Vol. 7 de la Historia de España, dirigida por Josep Fontana y Ramón Villares. Barcelona-Madrid: Crítica/Marcial Pons.
