= Martists =

Martists Martistas
- Leader: Cristino Martos
- Founded: 1890
- Dissolved: 1893
- Split from: Liberal Party
- Ideology: Liberalism
- Political position: Centre-left

The Martists (Spanish: Martistas) were a political faction within the Liberal Party, led by Cristino Martos, which split from the party in 1890 and ran on its own in the 1891 general election. The faction disbanded after Martos' death in January 1893.
