= Centralist Republican Party =

Centralist Republican Party Partido Republicano Centralista
- Leader: Nicolás Salmerón
- Founded: 1886
- Dissolved: 1903
- Split from: Progressive Republican Party
- Merged into: Republican Union
- Ideology: Republicanism; Progressivism
- Political position: Centre-left

The Centralist Republican Party (Spanish: Partido Republicano Centralista, PRC) was a Spanish political party created by Nicolás Salmerón in 1886 as a split from the Progressive Republican Party.

== See also ==
- Liberalism and radicalism in Spain
