= Pact of El Pardo =

Informal agreement of party alternation in Spain

The Pact of El Pardo was an informal agreement which supposedly took place on 24 November 1885, in the face of King Alfonso XII's imminent death. It confirmed a system of party alternation ("turno") that lasted until General Primo de Rivera's coup in 1923. The pact was sealed in the Royal Palace of El Pardo.

== Historical context ==
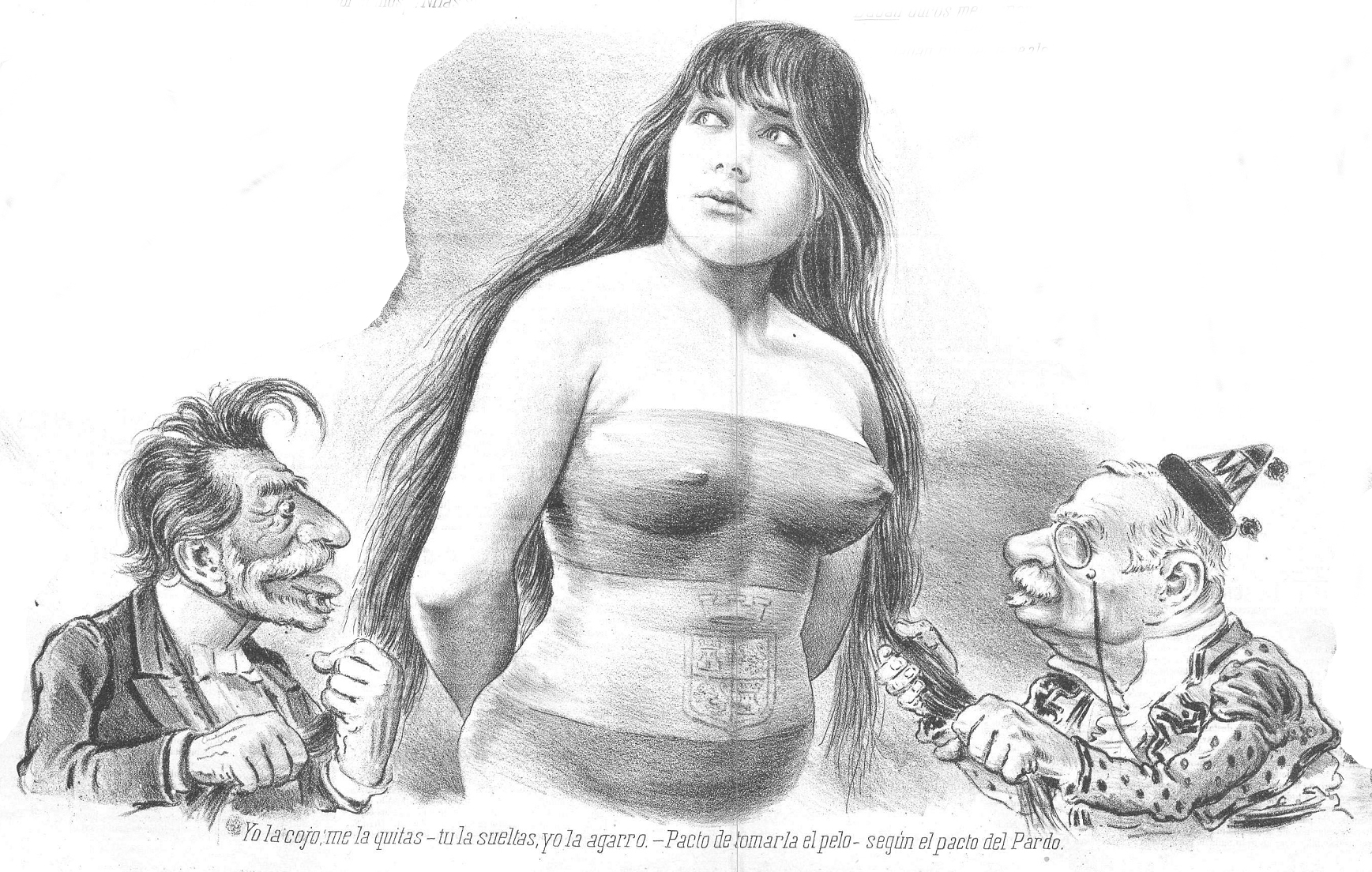
Caricature from Don Quijote magazine mocking the pact as the "Pact to grab her from the hair"

The pact was reached between Antonio Cánovas del Castillo, leader of the Conservative Party, and Práxedes Mateo Sagasta, leader of the Liberal Party. The two political parties dominated Spanish politics during the Restoration period. The aim of the pact was to provide stability to the regime, which was thought to be in jeopardy due to the proximity of the King's death. The pact established a system of alternation of the two major political parties, effectively ensuring that they would "take turns" governing the country within a democratic framework. This was achieved through the use of caciques, powerful individuals who greatly influenced the vote around their respective areas. The pact also served the purpose of integrating into the system the political groups that were marginalized by the 1875 Restoration. On one hand, the neocatólico followers of Alejandro Pidal y Mon were absorbed into the Conservative Party, and on the other the progressive posibilistas, associated with Emilio Castelar, found representation in the Liberal Party. Some sources claim that such a pact was never formalized, in the sense that there was no agreement for the two parties to "take turns" to govern the country. Instead, it was merely a meeting between the two major leaders in which they both recognized the necessity of a will to achieve consensus in a critical juncture in the country's political destiny. The meeting between Cánovas and Sagasta was arranged by General Arsenio Martínez Campos.
