= Universal manhood suffrage =

Voting rights system

Universal manhood suffrage is a form of voting rights in which all adult male citizens within a political system are allowed to vote, regardless of income, property, religion, race, or any other qualification. It is sometimes summarized by the slogan, "one man, one vote".

== History ==
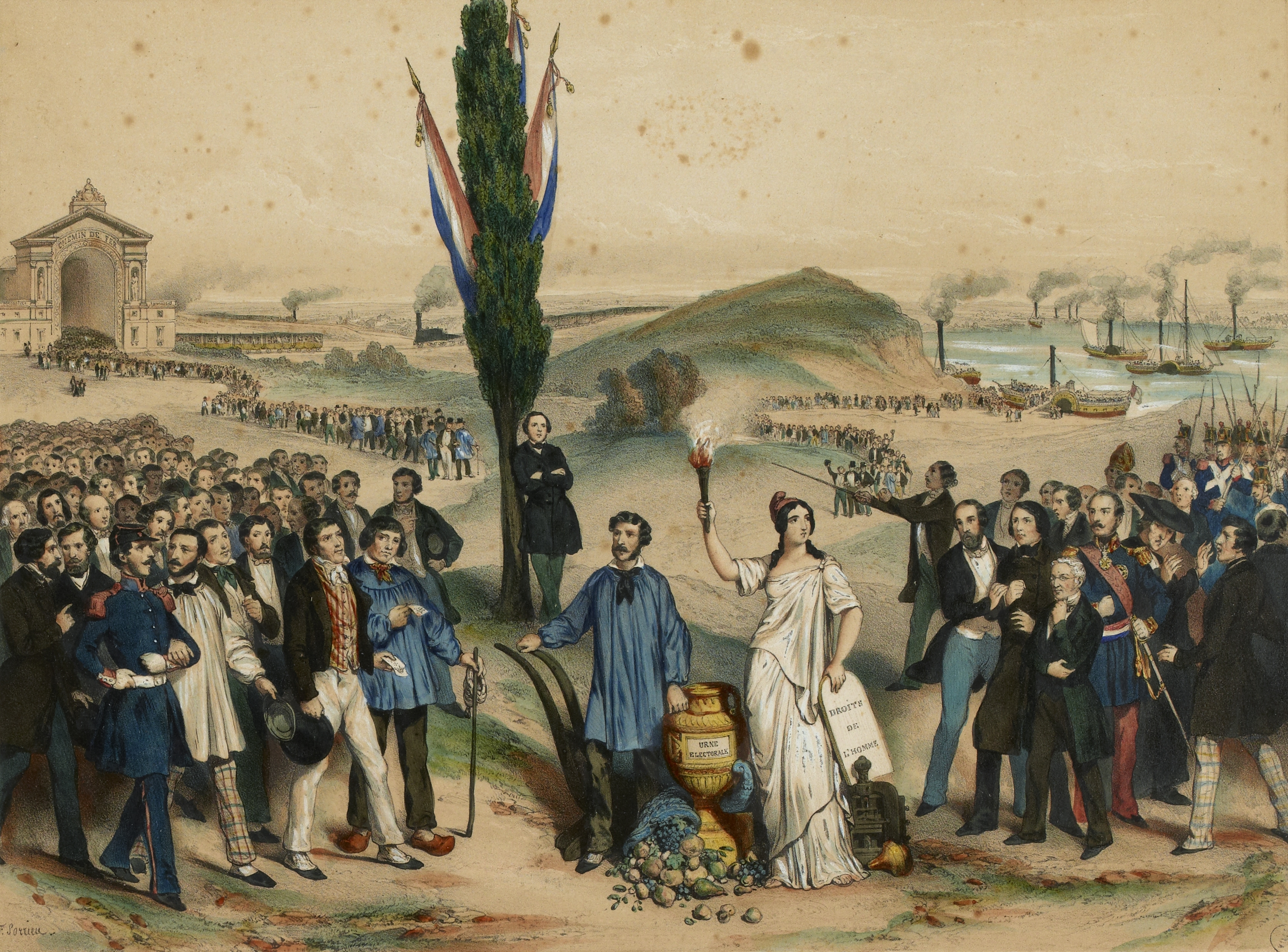
The establishment of universal male suffrage in France in 1848 was an important milestone in the history of democracy.

In 1789, Revolutionary France adopted the Declaration of the Rights of Man and of the Citizen and, although short-lived, the National Convention was elected by all men in 1792. It was revoked by the Directory in 1795. Universal male suffrage was re-established in France in the wake of the French Revolution of 1848.

In the Australian colonies, universal male suffrage first became law in the colony of South Australia in 1856. This was followed by the colonies of Victoria and New South Wales in 1857 and 1858. This included the introduction of the secret ballot.

In the United States, the rise of Jacksonian democracy from the 1820s to 1850s led to a close approximation of universal manhood suffrage among white people being adopted in all states by 1856. Poorer white male citizens gained representation; however, tax-paying requirements remained in five states until 1860, in two states until the 20th century, and many poor white people were later disenfranchised. The expansion of suffrage was largely peaceful, excepting the Rhode Island Dorr Rebellion. Most African-American men remained excluded; though the Fifteenth Amendment to the United States Constitution, ratified in 1870, upheld their voting rights, they were denied the right to vote in many places for another century until the Civil Rights Movement gained passage of the Voting Rights Act of 1965 through Congress.

In 1925, the Japanese government passed a bill granting universal manhood suffrage, additionally removing the poll tax. The New Women's Society sidestepped its activism that year in order for legislation to freely pass.

As women also began to win the right to vote during the late 19th and early 20th centuries, the goal of universal manhood suffrage was replaced by universal suffrage.

== See also ==
- Universal Manhood Suffrage Law
- Women's suffrage
