= Constitutional Union Party (Cuba) =

Constitutional Union Unión Constitucional
- Founded: 1878
- Dissolved: 1898
- Ideology: Conservatism; Spanish unionism
- Political position: Centre-right to right-wing

The Constitutional Union Party (Spanish: Partido Unión Constitucional) or Constitutional Union of Cuba (Spanish: Unión Constitucional de Cuba) was a loyalist conservative political party in Cuba during Spanish colonial times. The party, which brought together peninsular and members of the Creole bourgeoisie, included several Cuban "new nobles" among its members.
