= Unconditional Spanish Party =

Political party in Puerto Rico

Unconditional Spanish Party Partido Incondicional Español
- Founded: 1873
- Dissolved: 1898
- Ideology: Conservatism; Neocolonialism
- Political position: Center-right to right-wing

The Unconditional Spanish Party (Spanish: Partido Incondicional Español) was a loyalist conservative political party in Puerto Rico during Spanish colonial times. It was founded in November 1870 as the Partido Liberal Conservador (Liberal Conservative Party), later changing its name to Partido Incondicional Español in 1873. The party favored traditionalist assimilation into the political party system of Spain. It purchased the newspaper Boletín Mercantil to serve as the party's official organ for disseminating its conservative views. Most of its members belonged to the Puerto Rican Volunteers Corps.

There were no political parties in Puerto Rico until 1870. Partido Incondicional Español was one of two parties formed in Puerto Rico in the early 1870s, the other party being the Partido Liberal Reformista. Partido Incondicional Español represented the conservative side of Puerto Rican politics under the Spanish sovereignty, while Partido Liberal Refomista represented the liberal side. The party existed from 1870 until the end of Spanish sovereignty in Puerto Rico in 1898, when it dissolved. During those 28 years, the party was presided first by Jose Ramon Fernandez, then by Marques de la Esperanza, and last by Pablo Ubarri.

== Members ==
- Ángel Rivero Méndez
- Manuel Egozcue Cintrón
