= Progressive Republican Party (Spain) =

Progressive Republican Party Partido Republicano Progresista
- Leader: Manuel Ruiz Zorrilla; José María Esquerdo
- Founded: 1885
- Dissolved: 1912
- Merged into: Reformist Party
- Ideology: Liberalism; Progressivism; Republicanism

The Progressive Republican Party (Spanish: Partido Republicano Progresista, PRP) was a Spanish political party created in 1880 by Manuel Ruiz Zorrilla. Ruiz Zorrilla wrote his testament in January 1895 declaring his successor, and thus the reins of the party were passed to José María Esquerdo upon Ruiz Zorrilla's death. The latter helped to create the Republican Union in 1903. Following the death of Esquerdo, the party dissolved in June 1912, integrating into the Reformist Party of Melquíades Álvarez and Gumersindo de Azcárate.

== See also ==
- Liberalism and radicalism in Spain
