= Spanish nationalism =

Political ideology asserting the unity of Spain

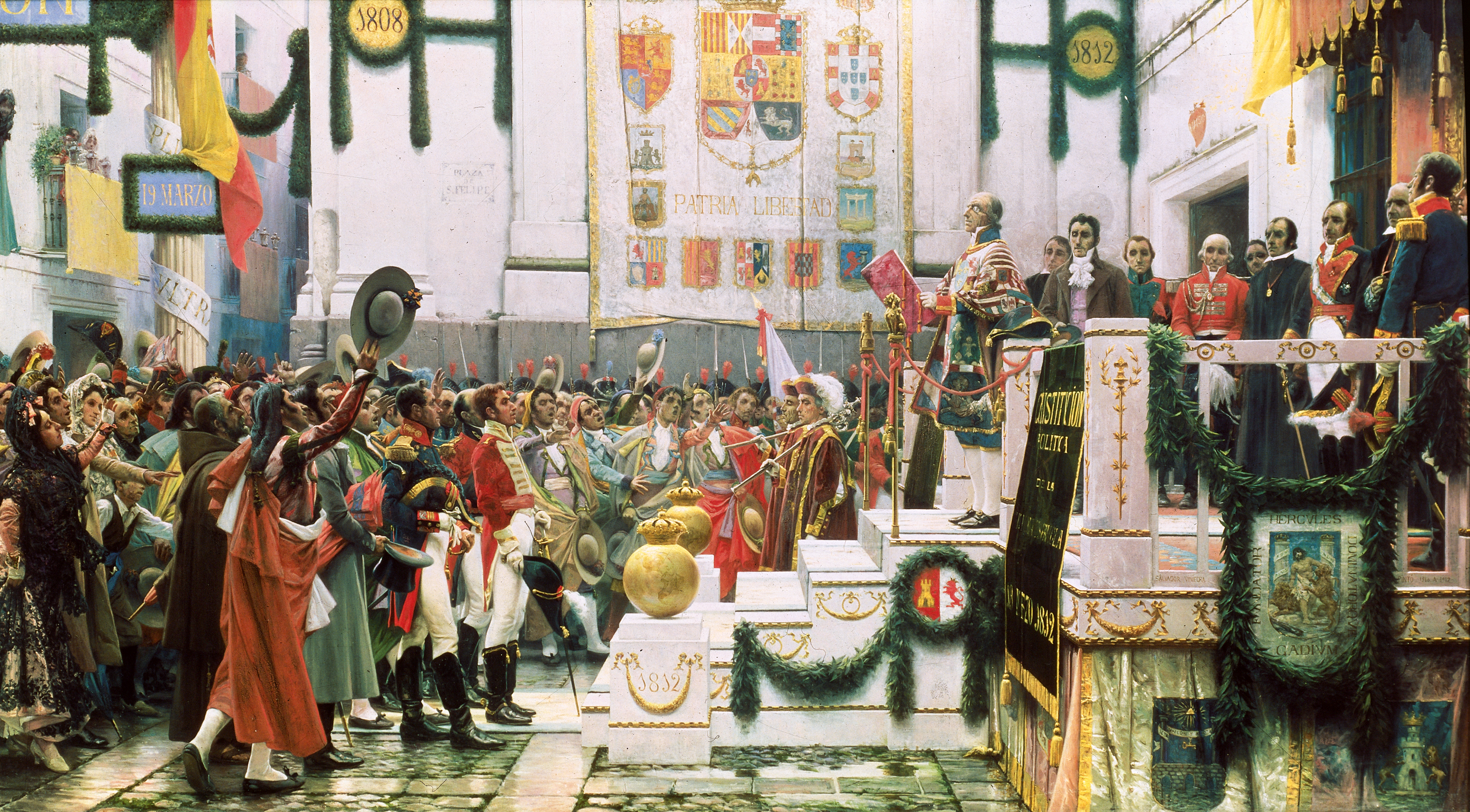
The promulgation of the Spanish Constitution of 1812 by the Cortes of Cádiz, as depicted in the painting of Salvador Viniegra (Museo de las Cortes de Cádiz)

The creation of the tradition of the political community of Spaniards as common destiny over other communities has been argued to trace back to the Cortes of Cádiz. From 1812 on, revisiting the previous history of Spain, Spanish liberalism tended to take for granted the national conscience and the Spanish nation.

A by-product of 19th-century Spanish nationalist thinking is the concept of Reconquista, which holds the power of propelling the weaponized notion of Spain being a nation shaped against Islam. The strong interface of nationalism with colonialism is another feature of 19th-century nation building in Spain, with the defence of slavery and colonialism in Cuba being often able to reconcile tensions between mainland elites of Catalonia and Madrid throughout the period.

During the first half of 20th century (notably during the dictatorship of Primo de Rivera and the dictatorship of Franco), a new brand of Spanish nationalism with a marked military flavour and an authoritarian stance (as well as promoting policies favouring the Spanish language against the other languages in the country) as a means of modernizing the country was developed by Spanish conservatives, fusing regenerationist principles with traditional Spanish nationalism. The authoritarian national ideal resumed during the Francoist dictatorship, in the form of National-Catholicism, which was in turn complemented by the myth of Hispanidad. Identified with Francoism, positive affirmation of Spanish nationalism was delegitimised after the death of the dictator in 1975.

A distinct manifestation of Spanish nationalism in modern Spanish politics is the interchange of attacks with competing regional nationalisms. Initially present after the end of Francoism in a rather diffuse and reactive form, the Spanish nationalist discourse has been often self-branded as "constitutional patriotism" since the 1980s. Often ignored as in the case of other State nationalisms, its alleged "non-existence" has been a commonplace espoused by prominent figures in the public sphere as well as the mass-media in the country.

A central scholarly debate pertaining to the construction of the contemporary Spanish national identity revolves around the assessment of the effective reach of nationalising mechanisms, most specifically vis-à-vis the axiom of 19th-century weak nationalization, supported, for example, by José Álvarez Junco.

Spanish nationalism is a justification of the centralist Spanish state, according to Borja de Riquer. In this sense, it is the historical result of political-ideological-economic interests among Spanish elites, particularly the need to create a unifying national identity in the wake of the collapse of the Spanish imperial project following the Battle of Ayacucho in 1824.

== History ==
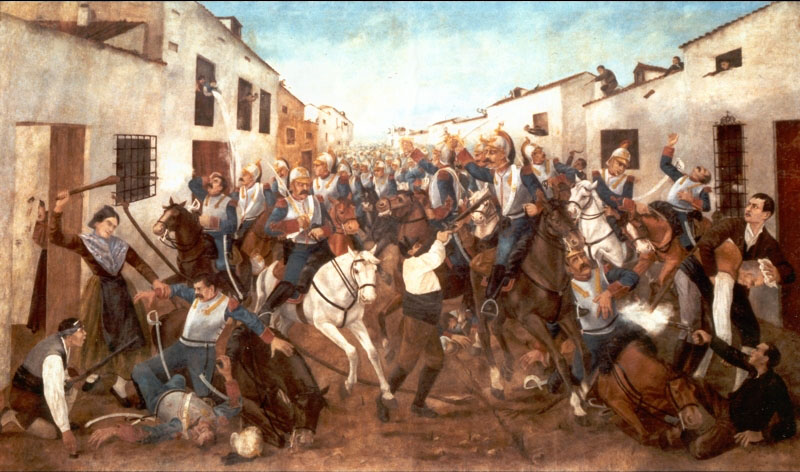
Spanish guerrilla resistance to the Napoleonic French invasion of Spain at the Battle of Valdepeñas

Historically, Spanish nationalism specifically emerged with liberalism, during the Peninsular War against occupation by the Napoleonic France. As put by José Álvarez Junco, insofar we speak of nationalism in Spain since 1808, the Spanish nationalist enterprise was a work of liberals, who turned their victory "to a feverish identity of patriotism and the defense of liberty". (Note: The Asturian deputy Agustín Argüelles when he presented the Constitution of 1812, reportedly claimed: "Spaniards, you now have a homeland.")

The Carlism, which was a defensive movement of the Old Regime, did not regard the adjective "national" with any esteem (national sovereignty, national militia, or national properties) and considered it a term used only by liberals (who were becoming more and more progresistas). Up until the 1860s, the Carlism movement tended to label its followers as "Catholics" rather than as "Spaniards".

Only after the 1859–1860 Hispano-Moroccan War (which was embraced by an until then unseen patriotic fervour across the political spectrum) the hitherto rather uninterested Catholic conservative forces were sold into the possibilities offered by Spanish nationalism; thus, in the last half of the century, a number of Conservative historians (most notably Menéndez Pelayo, whose figure eventually became a lodestar of national catholicism) propelled a new canon of the history of Spain underpinned by their idea of "Catholic unity" as tenet for the Spanish nationality and the monarchy. The menéndezpelayista nationalist construct was well defined in its Catholic matrix (Catholicism would end up becoming the keystone of the reactionary right wing in the 20th century) yet more nuanced in other regards accounting for both a staunch rejection of alternative nationalisms and separatisms and a recognition of the internal plurality of Spain.

Restoration prime minister and historian Antonio Cánovas del Castillo, reproduced some of the best-known paragraphs of the Memorial of the Count-Duke of Olivares in his book Estudios del reinado of Felipe IV, published in 1888, and considered that the Memorial should be read as a manifesto in which the bases of the project of the Spanish nation state devised by the Count-Duke were established.

With the loss of Cuba interpreted as the first crack on the unity of the nation (the Cuban War had been seen by many in the country as a civil war rather than a foreign conflict), Spanish nationalism of the time had to come to terms with the loss of the island at a time when the possession of colonies was seen as a sign of the vitality of the nation.

The so-called "spirit of the 98", created after disaster of 1898, entailed a response coming from the elite intellectual milieus striving for the development of a new Spanish nationalism. While this reaction was not initially identified per se with the right, (several of the representatives of the literary nationalism of the 98 were actually close to socialist or anarchist stances early in their life) many of the most prominent noventayochistas espoused ideas compatible with the conservative thought and several of them eventually evolved towards non-liberal forms of Conservatism, and a group of them would have a substantial intellectual influence in the moulding of the later Fascist ultranationalism. While not yet Fascist nor proto-Fascist, the socalled Group of Three: Azorín, Pío Baroja and Ramiro de Maeztu, laid the seeds for a potential doctrinal articulation susceptible of being seized by a Fascist movement.

=== 19th century ===
==== First Moroccan War ====
After continued incidents, in October 1859 the First Moroccan War began, with a patriotic enthusiasm to imitate the French colonial advances in Algeria, and the dazzle by the opportunities. Articles and books about it were published everywhere, telling about Spain's mission in Africa, and creating a story that contrasted Morocco and Spain, identifying them with despotism and freedom, or integrism and tolerance, respectively, and they listed Spanish exploits throughout history.

Numerous speeches were also made, such as that of Francisco Javier Simonet at the Ateneo de Madrid, in 1859, legitimizing the right to assist Spain in its civilizing mission, given that in his opinion, North Africa was populated by two great races, Tamites (Arabs) and Semites (Berbers), both in a state of ignorance and barbarism.

By itself or through the patriotism of the media, the war acted as a nationalist agent among the population. Nevertheless, journalists like Ruperto de Aguirre go further, and talk about race and degeneration applied to the North African population, as does Emilio Castelar in the Crónica de la guerra de África, where he elaborates a patriotic text that uses the concept of the Iberian race, and describes it as having a civilizing mission, in the same way that the Slavic race had to "civilize" Turkey, and also mentions the Indo-European race, "opposed from centuries ago to the Semitic race".

=== 20th century ===
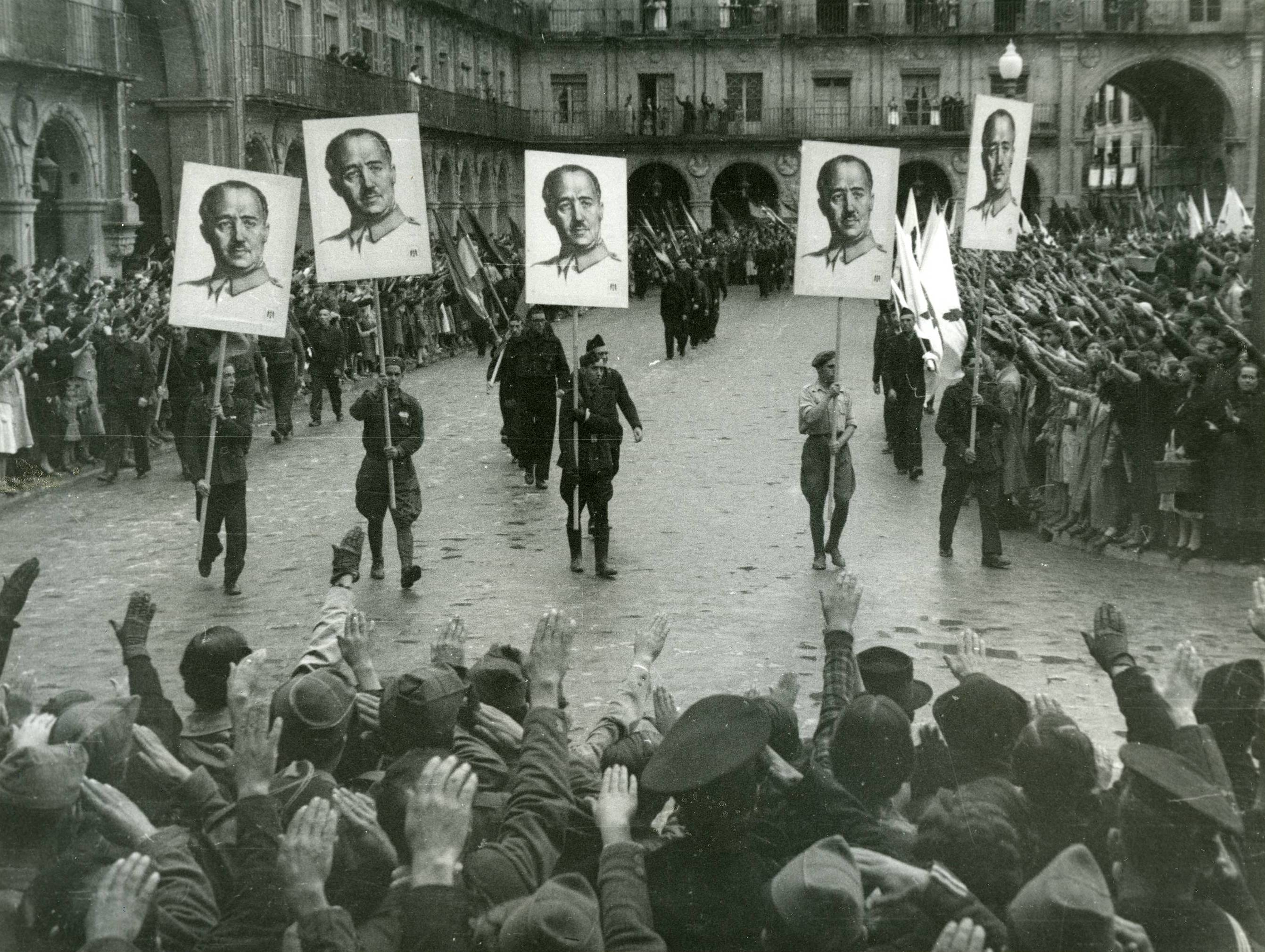
Francoist demonstration in Salamanca in 1937

In the view of Ismael Saz, within regenerationism, a diverse brand of nationalism, the two main antiliberal nationalist political cultures in the 20th century in Spain would come to be forged: the reactionary nationalist one (national catholicism) and the fascist one, both enjoying hegemony during the Francoist dictatorship.

Spanish liberal philosopher and essayist José Ortega y Gasset defined Spain as an "enthusing project for a life in common" (proyecto sugestivo de vida en común). Meanwhile, the Fascist leader José Antonio Primo de Rivera preferred the definition of a "unity of destiny in the universal" and defended a return to the traditional and spiritual values of Imperial Spain. The idea of empire makes it universalist rather than localist, this is what makes it singular among other forms of nationalisms, but closer to others (Italian fascism).

==== Relationship between Spanish nationalism and Argentine nationalism ====
Many of the people involved in the establishment of the word Hispanidad have a relationship with Argentina, to live there, such as the Spanish writer José María Salaverría, resident in Argentina between 1910 and 1913, the Spanish priest Zacarías de Vizcarra, resident in Buenos Aires, or Ramiro de Maeztu, ambassador to Argentina between 1928 and 1930.

In fact, throughout the first third of the 20th century there is a fluid relationship between Spanish nationalism and Argentine nationalism, which would include the creation of material of great impact on both sides of the Atlantic, such as now the book El Solar de la raza, by the argentine Manuel Gálvez, from 1913. An impact that would extend to the Spanish Civil War, for example in the instructions of the Fiscalía del Ejercito de Ocupación, of January 1939, preparing the occupation of Barcelona, which unified the criteria of the military prosecutors in the Memoria de la Fiscalía de Ejercito de Ocupación, with instructions such as:

" The national site must be disinfected. And here is the work - glorious and glorious - entrusted by chance to military justice... This immense pyre in which so much dross is being eliminated... The Inquisition must be resurrected,... of very Spanish originality. .. [There is] a need for a new legal building on the site of the race... stripped of all feelings of personal piety... The enemies are factions guilty of the crime of Military Rebellion, factions of rebels against the Fatherland "

Perhaps the fact that, during the 1919 pogrom in Argentina, during the Argentinian Tragic Week, it was called to attack Jews and Catalans indiscriminately can be placed within the relations with Spanish nationalism . The reasons are not clear, especially considering that, in the case of Buenos Aires, the Catalan colony, established mainly in the neighborhood of Montserrat, came from the very foundation of the city. It could be pointed to the fact that Spanish nationalism already at that time qualified the Catalans as of Semitic ethnicity.

==== Relations Spanish National Catholicism - German National Socialism ====
Apart from the contacts of Spanish politicians and military with Nazi leaders, there is also a wider influence of Nazism in Spanish society, through the German cultural centers in Spain. After the World War I, Germany had to endure economic sanctions and scientific boycotts. To overcome the obstacles to an international relationship, Germany opted for a cultural foreign policy, particularly intense with countries that had become neutral. Among them, Spain became a preferred target, for itself and as a bridge to Latin America. German schools and cultural centers were established in Barcelona and Madrid, and in a reciprocal sense, Ibero-American institutes were opened in Germany. And with the arrival of the National Socialist party in power in Germany, the centers abroad became propaganda instruments.

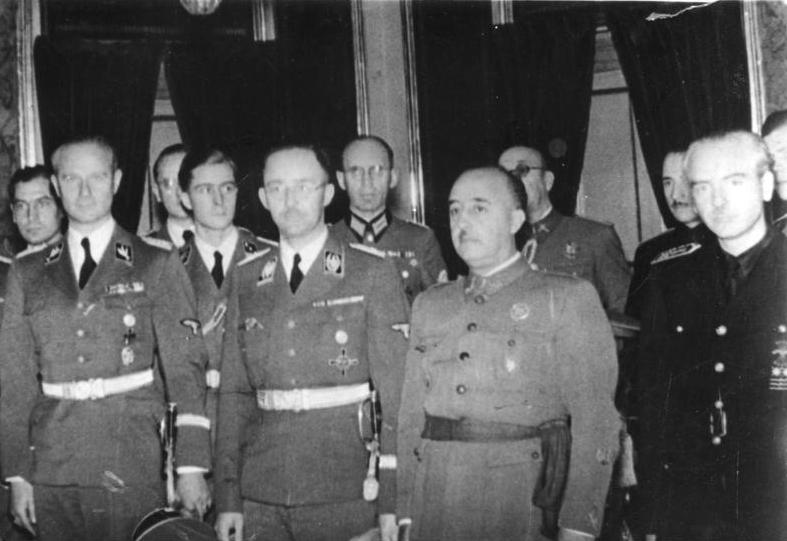
Von Ribbertrop, Himmler, Franco and Serrano Suñer

In addition to soldiers from the Spanish Military Union, very active in the spread of Spanish nationalist and coup ideology, both people from the CEDA and the Falange, like the respective parties, had relations with Nazism, and when the revolt against the Spanish Republic began, an intense collaboration was established, numerous German soldiers collaborated with the Spanish rebels, and even military units, such as the Condor Legion, fought there.

At the same time, the German National Socialist government sought to establish relations with civil society figures favorable to the Franco coup d'état, with priority given to those who had already had contact with German culture, both in Spain and in Germany (e.g., through the former scholarships of the JAE - Board for the Extension of Studies-), for example, the Antonio Vallejo-Nágera. They also promoted visits to Germany (including the first concentration camps) by influential figures of the Spanish right, such as Gil Robles or the priest Tusquets.

The cultural collaboration extended to many other areas, such as cinema, or the intense cooperation between the Ahnenerbe and Falangist archaeologists, in which even the secretary of the Falange, José Luis Arrese, reported Himmler personally about the interest in creating a kind of Spanish Ahnenerbe dependent on the Falange to investigate Spanish prehistory, as was done by the Nazi organization, with whom he wanted to coordinate. It can also be mentioned that, since 1937, the Hitler Youth and the Youth Organizations of FET and JONS, organized some joint activities and exchanged material such as magazines, or the collaboration between the Women's Section of the Falange and the Nazi women's organizations (youth and adult: Bund Deutscher Mädel and NS-Frauenschaft) between 1936 and 1945.

==== Spanish civil war ====
By calling itself "national", the rebel side makes both a declaration of intent and a great advertising maneuver, complemented by the designation of the red side towards the republicans, and generally Anti-Spain to all those they considered enemies. It is a successful propaganda action, given that currently there are still those who call the sides (or on "national" radio) with the fascist denomination. In each of the dams of a population, the motto Entra España or Ya es España was repeated; and in addition to identifying the Republican side as red and anti-Spanish, they also did it with Russia and the Jews. In the case of Russia, it continued to be done obsessively after the war with the topics, turned into clichés, of Russia is guilty and Moscow's gold). In the case of the Jews, after the fall of the Axis, public culpability decreased drastically.

In the context of the civil war, the rebel side issued orders of an ultra-nationalist nature:

Order and Hand:

Article 1: Any extremist element who, when given the cry of VIVA ESPAÑA, does not respond in the same way, will be executed by firing squad in the act.

Article 2: When the authorities present themselves in the vicinity of their homes and the personnel who are inside before the arrival of the force do not come out with their arms open in the air shouting VIVA ESPAÑA they will be passed by the weapons in the act (...)

Falces, August 11, 1936. His Excellency. Mr. Military commander of the square.

===== Racism and eugenics within Franco's Spanish nationalism =====
Both before and after the civil war, Spanish nationalism was heavily imbued with racism. Even the influential lawyer and politician José Antonio Primo de Rivera wrote an essay titled "Germans against Berbers", with clear racial connotations. The speeches, articles and harangues of the fascists were full of allusions to the "Spanish race". Since it does not seem to have had consequences, not much has been investigated, but there are works that postulate that the war served to purify impurities within the Spanish race. Several Francoist scientists and intellectuals proposed racial selection, such as Antonio Vallejo-Nájera:

...the race received parasitic Hebrew and Arab elements, which continued to adhere to it, despite the exile of Jews and Moors. Today, as during the Reconquest, we fight the Spanish-Roman-Goths against the Jews-Moriscos. The pure racial trunk against the spurious.

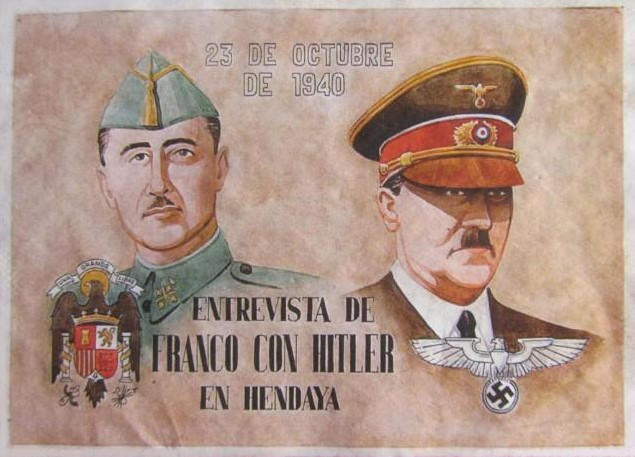
Informative poster of Franco's meeting with Hitler in Hendaye

As in the case of Nazi Germany, the Jews were the ultimate enemy, the race to be exterminated. There are exhortations against them at all political levels, starting with General Franco himself. With the practical absence of Jews from the peninsula, except for the community in Catalonia, which was made up of Sephardim who returned after the First World War, the Francoist regime abstractly redirected the violence towards those Spaniards who were alleged to have physical features which were considered "Semitic remains". Another target of the Francoist regime was the segment of the Spanish population which was alleged to have physical features which were considered "Moorish racial remnents", Kabyles they were called, since they were still reeling from the defeats in the Rif War. And the last were the Masons, servants of the Jews in their plans to dominate the nations.

The Spanish racial model was Castilian, mythologized by an imperial past consisting of conquistadores and wealth acquired through conquest. The Castilians sought to purge individuals who had Semitic and Berber racial traces, despite the ancient expulsion of Jews and Moors, and they were also opposed to communism and separatism (the name which was given to the catalanism). The Catalans were identifiable by the ways in which they made money – through industry, commerce, and banking, not through conquest and agriculture – and they were also identifiable by their anti-patriotism: they refused to accept Castilianity, they continued to practice self-government, and they continued to speak Catalan.

Purifying proposals arose from here. Those include one by Felipe Aparicio Sarabia:

The war in Spain has put the urgent problem of purifications on the table .... The Spanish population of the future must be rigidly controlled. And for that we have to start from purification, that is, a previous selection that defines the inhabitants ... not only in the interior of Spain, but also outside .... The undesirables, the evil ones will oppose them.

another by Antonio Vallejo-Nágera, who believed that the war should be waged in an environment that allowed a selection without neglecting the Christian mandates:

In racial politics, two criteria can be followed: the geneticist and the behaviourist. Geneticists advocate the selection of good quality biotopes and the elimination of biological inferiors .... Behaviorists act by modifying the environmental conditions that affect the biotype, in order to achieve its progressive improvement over the generations. Regenerating the breed for the benefit of selecting the best has the counterpart of the elimination – impossible and anti-Christian – of deteriorated genotypes .... The degeneration of the Hispanic race – in regard to the loss or decrepitude of ethical racial values specific and acquisition of moral flaws embedded in the genotype- comes from the noxious spiritual environment .... In the heat of war, the germs of race regeneration have flourished with extraordinary vigor .... The anvil of war is an appropriate instrument to forge select groups, because it eliminates from the ranks of combatants those with a bad temper of spirit and negligible biological quality. War has the drawback that many of the best succumb, because they are the ones who risk the most. The surviving heroes will be the regenerators of the race. Of the cowards and the ambushers, no other progeny can be expected than the rickety of body and spirit. The hero of the front must be granted ... the quality of select, due to his physical vigor and his moral mettle... Selection of the best at the front; then forge in the rear so that they return to combat with the responsibility of command .... Military Academies are the ideal way to train the eugenic aristocracy that we advocate in our "Racial Hygiene Program.

and another from Juan José López Ibor, years after the war

It has felt .... Spain, broken at the very core of its history, and .... positive and negative forces have collided on its surface, in a purer way. Thus, the Spaniard, in that terrible purification of war, has been able to purify himself as a people and as destiny, and after the dark night of a life without depth, dedicated to remedying his daily needs, he has felt the sudden illumination of his own essence.

According to statements by the Rebel faction spokesman Gonzalo de Aguilera:

We must kill, kill, you know? They're like animals, you know? And you don't have to wait for them to get rid of the virus of Bolshevism. After all, rats and lice are the carriers of the plague. Now I hope you understand what do we mean by the regeneration of Spain .... Our program consists ... in exterminating a third of the male population of Spain.

The purge pointed to tens of thousands of individuals throughout the State, but also special attention to the peripheral territories that had been independent from Castile: Galicia, the Basque Country, the old Al-Andalus (Andalusia and Extremadura), where the repression was brutal, and especially the catalan language zones of the Crown of Aragon, where the repression was continued over time until it was consolidated as state policy.

====== Theft of children ======
Francoism seen from a broad biopolitics, which includes the artificial dynamics of populations, applied as a eugenic action, the theft of tens of thousands of children of republicans and the adoption of them by fascist families, and the prevention of their degeneration, so they could be controlled with ease and taught to grow up to become loyal followers of Franco. According to "Racisme i supremacisme polítics a l'Espanya contemporània", although "at that time it was normal for children to be stolen from single mothers in fascist countries such as Italy or ultra-Catholic countries such as Ireland, the difference was that in Spain, married women were also stolen ( they were imprisoned either with or without their husbands). Child thefts in Spain are similar to child thefts in some Nazi-occupied areas (for example, in certain Polish areas that the Nazis considered Aryan), where race rather than the family environment is considered correct."

Over time, eugenics gave way to the simple business of baby trafficking, which continued to occur well into the era of the democracy.

==== Post-1978 politics ====
Civil flag of Spain, the Spanish bi-color has been a symbol of Spain during its monarchical periods from 1785 to 1873, 1874–1931, and 1975–present, and was used by the First Spanish Republic and Francoist Spain. It has been a common symbol of Spanish nationalism.

The political transition which occurred in Spain, together with social and economic changes rooted in a detailed sense of modernization, began at the end of Franco's time in power and lasted until the creation of current institutions (Spanish Constitution of 1978 and Statutes of Autonomy). This also produced a strong reversal of the social uses for Spanish symbols of national identification.

Peripheral nationalisms have acquired a significant presence and territorial power, especially in Catalonia (Convergence and Union Republican Left of Catalonia) and the Basque Country (Basque Nationalist Party, as well as among EA and so-called abertzale left). The numbers are substantially lower in comparison to Catalonia and Basque Country, but these nationalisms are still present in Navarre (Nabai) and Galicia (Galician National Bloc) too. The Canary Islands (Coalición Canaria), Andalusia (Partido Andalucista) and other autonomous communities also have less obvious nationalism and are often grouped as regionalisms, based on linguistic or historical differential facts no less distinct than the previous ones.

In comparison to other nationalisms, "Spanish nationalism" is often referred to as españolismo, an equivalent to centralism. Usually with a controversial political purpose, it may be identified with conservative nostalgia for Franco's regime or with alleged state oppression in those territories, which in extreme cases (particularly ETA in the Basque Country and Navarre) is used as justification for terrorism that sees itself as armed struggle for national liberation. By contrast, none of the major political parties affected by such designation of españolistas or "Spanish nationalists", self-identify as such. Instead, they use the phrase non-nationalist to separate themselves from the nationalist, which is how they usually designate the so-called "periphery" or outliers.

It seeks to respect the different visions of Spain and fit it into a pluralistic framework, inclusive and non-exclusive. Concepts which often coincide the majority's political parties, Spanish Socialist Workers' Party and People's Party, the minority's, United Left, Union, Progress and Democracy, and other regional or nationalist parties sometimes called moderate, despite maintaining deep political differences.

=== 21st century ===
Democracy consolidated an apparent asymmetric regime of bilingualism of sorts, wherein the Spanish government has employed a system of laws that favored Spanish over other Spanish languages (such as Catalan) which becomes the weaker of the two languages' relationship, and therefore, in the absence of other states where it is spoken, is doomed to extinction in the medium or short term. In the same vein, its use in the Spanish Congress was not allowed until 2023, with previous attempts before that year blocked. During the Spanish EU presidency in 2023, there was a formal request to add Catalan, Basque and Galician to the list of official languages of the EU, following past requests from Ireland with Gaelic with less speakers. In other institutional areas, such as justice, Plataforma per la Llengua has denounced Catalanophobia. The association Soberania i Justícia have also denounced it in an act in the European Parliament. It also takes the form of linguistic secessionism, originally advocated by the Spanish extreme right and which has finally been adopted by the Spanish government itself and state bodies.

Aside, the fiscal drainage of the Catalan-speaking territories is something studied by some public and private bodies, from Chambers of Commerce to banks. This is added to the investment deficit in infrastructure, and even in political actions of business relocation of Catalan companies, initiated by the Franco regime and continued during democracy, and accelerated during the catalan sovereignist process. Also, after the 2017 thwarted referendum on Catalan independence, hitherto stigmatized public displays of Spanish nationalism (such as flags hanging from buildings) increased.

== Linguistic nationalism ==
According to JC. Moreno Cabrera, in addition to the principles of indivisibility of the Spanish nation and the sovereignty belonging only to the Spanish people included in articles 1 and 2 of the 1978 Constitution, there is another nationalist principle enshrined in Article 3 of the Spanish Constitution, concerning language policy, reading "Castilian is the official language of Spain". Article 3 of Article 2 combines the indivisible unity of the Spanish nation with the Spanish language as a linguistic component of the indivisibility of this nation, which, in the view of Cabrera, underpin the denial of the fundamental rights of other nations within the state.

== See also ==
- Pan-Hispanism
- Nationalisms and regionalisms of Spain
- Spanish unionism
- Spanish republicanism
- Spanish irredentism
- Iberian federalism (Iberism)
- The two Spains
- Hispanophobia
- Catalanophobia
- History of Spain
