= Galarraga =

Galarraga is a surname of Basque origin. Notable people with the surname include:

- Amalia Galárraga (c. 1884 – 1971), Spanish feminist
- Andrés Galarraga (born 1961), Venezuelan baseball player
- Armando Galarraga (born 1982), Venezuelan baseball player
- Belen Galarraga (born 1993), Ecuador-born beauty pageant titleholder for Portugal
- Manuel Eguiguren Galarraga (1930–2012), Spain-born Bolivian Catholic bishop
- Margarita Salaverría Galárraga (1911–2000), Spanish diplomat
- Isidro Lángara (full name Isidro Lángara Galarraga; 1912–1992), Spanish football player
- Eduardo Maceira (full name Eduardo José Maceira Galarraga; born 1996), Venezuelan football player

== See also ==
- Armando Galarraga's near-perfect game, baseball game played in 2010
