= Ideal (newspaper) =

Newspaper in Spain

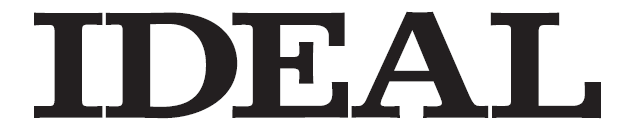
- Type: Daily newspaper
- Founder: Pedro Gómez Aparicio
- Editor: Corporación de Medios de Andalucía (Vocento)
- Founded: 8 May 1932
- Headquarters: Peligros (Granada)
- Circulation: 31,006 copies (2010)
- Sister newspapers: La Voz de Almería; Diario de Almería
- ISSN: 1132-0117
- Website: ideal.es

Ideal is a daily Spanish language newspaper edited and published in Granada.

It forms part of the Corporación de Medios de Andalucía, which in turn belongs to the grupo Vocento. Founded in 1932 by Editorial Católica, since then it has had a long history. While publication is largely circumscribed to Eastern Andalusia, Ideal is distributed in the provinces of Granada, Almería and Jaén, where it has local editions. At present it is the most widely subscription based newspaper in these provinces and one of the main newspapers in Andalusia, reaching in 2010 about 164,000 daily readers according to el Estudio general de medios (EGM).

== History ==
Ideal had in its origins in the Catholic and conservative daily La Gaceta del Sur, which had disappeared in 1931. The Catholic hierarchy of Granada decided to launch a new newspaper, counting on the collaboration of journalists such as Ángel Herrera Oria y de Pedro Gómez Aparicio. The newspaper went to the streets for the first time on May 8, 1932. It was edited by Editorial Católica. In these early years of existence was a clearly confessional and conservative newspaper, and its main journalistic rival was the liberal El Defensor de Granada. In the context of the 1930s, Ideal was the best manufactured newspaper in the province, surpassing others published in this period. (Note: Tras Ideal y El Defensor de Granada se publicaban el republicano La Publicidad y el independiente Noticiero Granadino.) During this era, it highlighted the work of Ramón Ruiz Alonso, the paper's typographer. During the years of the Second Republic the publication, which reached a circulation of 9000 copies, according to CEDA.

On 10 March 1936 a group of right wing supporters (Note: El historiador Hugh Thomas, citando a Ian Gibson, señala que este incendio fue obra de derechistas, que lo habrían realizado a modo de provocación.) set fire to the offices of Ideal, whose printing press was destroyed and the premises reduced to the foundations. As a consequence, the newspaper did not circulate for some months. In early July, the newspaper returned to Granada, shortly before the outbreak of the Spanish Civil War.

In February 2021 Miguel Cárceles was named delegate of Ideal in Almería, succeeding Ángel Iturbide.

== Supplements ==
On Sundays, like many other newspapers in the Grupo Vocento, Ideal distributes the supplement XLSemanal. It is a general journal, with reports and collaborations from writers like Arturo Pérez-Reverte and Juan Manuel de Prada.

== Directors ==
El diario ha sido dirigido desde su fundación por los siguientes periodistas:

Name	Duration	Notes
Pedro Gómez Aparicio	1932-1934	Founder
Fernando de Eguía Martínez	1934-1936	
Ernesto la Orden Miracle	1936	
Santiago Lozano García	1936-1938	Civil War
Aquilino Morcillo Herrera	1938-1952	
Santiago Lozano García	1952-1971	
Melchor Saiz-Pardo Rubio	1971-2002	Acquisition by Vocento.
Eduardo Peralta de Ana	2002–Present	

== Bibliography ==
- Armentia, José Ignacio; Caminos, José María (2009). Redacción Informativa en Prensa. Ariel. ISBN 978-84-344-1312-2.
- Barreiro, Cristina (2013). "El Ideal Gallego (1935-1955): baluarte católico en Galicia". Comunicación y Hombre. No. 9. pp. 167–185. ISSN 1885-365X.
- Blanco Martín, Miguel Ángel (2014). Cultura, periodismo y transición democrática en Almería (1973-1986). Universidad de Almería.
- Checa Godoy, Antonio (1989). Prensa y partidos políticos durante la II República. Universidad de Salamanca. ISBN 84-7481-521-5.
- Checa Godoy, Antonio (1991). Historia de la prensa andaluza. Fundación Blas Infante.
- Gibson, Ian (1981). El Asesinato de Federico García Lorca. Barcelona: publisher Bruguera.
- Martín Aguado, José Antonio; Vilamor, José R. (2012). Historia del Ya: sinfonía con final trágico. Fundación Universitaria San Pablo CEU. ISBN 978-84-15382-50-8.
- Martín García, Óscar J. (2006). A tientas con la democracia. Madrid: Catarata. ISBN 978-84-8319-390-7.
- Reig García, Ramón (2011). La comunicación en Andalucía: Historia, estructura y nuevas tecnologías. Sevilla: Centro de Estudios Andaluces. ISBN 978-84-939078-0-8.
- Ruiz Sánchez, José-Leonardo (2005). Catolicismo y comunicación en la historia contemporánea. Universidad de Sevilla.
- Thomas, Hugh (1976). Historia de la Guerra Civil Española. Barcelona: Círculo de Lectores. ISBN 84-226-0874-X.
