= Primitivo González del Alba =

Primitivo González del Alba

Primitivo González del Alba (February 24, 1849 – 1913) was a Spanish jurist, legal writer and criminologist from Burgos in northern Spain. He was involved in a number of famous criminal trials in the course of his career as a Public Prosecutor [Fiscal] and a judge, which took him to many parts of Spain and culminated in his appointment in 1911 to the highest court in Madrid, as a Magistrado del Tribunal Supremo de Justicia.

One of the leading Spanish criminologists of his day, his writings contributed to the debate on the underlying causes of crime. In particular, he stressed the importance of social factors in fostering crime, while maintaining, nevertheless, that individual free will [libre albedrío] still played a crucial role. In formulating this view, and by also articulating his belief that criminology would always be an evolving and never a static science, he challenged both the main schools of criminology (the Positivist school and the Classical school) and their rigid, opposing ideologies.

== Birth and family background ==
Primitivo González del Alba [henceforth referred to in this article as Primitivo] was born on 24 February 1849 in the city of Burgos, and baptised two days later in the church of San Cosme y San Damián es:Iglesia de San Cosme y San Damián (Burgos) with the full name of Primitivo Modesto Justo González del Alba. His father, Angel González y García (son of Alejandro González and Vicenta García), was a lieutenant in the army [teniente de infantería] who later became a captain in the newly formed Guardia Civil; at the time of Primitivo's birth he was deputy officer in the Archives Section [Oficial Segundo de la Sección Archivo de esta Capitanía General]. Primitivo's mother was Silvestra del Alba y Pardo, the daughter of Toribio del Alba and Hermenegilda Pardo. All Primitivo's grandparents were born in the city of Burgos, where he too was brought up. After the death of his father, the family moved close to the cathedral to live with his mother's brother, Pedro del Alba y Pardo, a clergyman who became Archdeacon of Burgos in 1865, when Primitivo was sixteen.

Primitivo's only sister, Petra [Juana Petra Cointa González del Alba], two years his senior, entered an enclosed convent in Burgos after being widowed at a young age and spent over forty years there as a nun, Sor Juana Petra. There was also a half-brother, Félix [Félix Santamaría del Alba], through a previous marriage of their mother's; he was a lawyer and politician who was elected as a Diputado representing Burgos in the Cortes and later became a Senador.

== University, politics and journalism ==
Having left Burgos to study at the University of Valladolid, Primitivo graduated in Law [Derecho] on 19 June 1869 – a time of political upheaval, as the September Revolution of 1868 had driven Queen Isabella II into exile and led to two years of near-anarchy. Attracted to journalism, when still aged twenty, Primitivo was one of the editorial assistants on La Conciliación, a Valladolid daily newspaper published between November 1869 and April 1870. Its aim was to reconcile (in opposition to the far left and far right parties) the Liberal Unionists, Progressives and Democratic Monarchists, which had formed a precarious alliance after the September Revolution. Primitivo's writings, and the political affiliations of the other newspapers for which he contributed articles in later life, indicate a consistent sympathy with democratic, progressive and liberal views.

== The beginnings of a legal career ==
Primitivo returned to Burgos to continue his legal studies at the Ilustre Colegio de Abogados , qualifying as a solicitor and, in December 1872, obtaining the second highest marks in the competitive examinations (oposiciones) to enter the ‘Cuerpo de Abogados del Estado’. This led in January 1873 to a government post in the Balearic Islands, as a state solicitor at Palma de Mallorca, during the period of the short-lived First Spanish Republic (1873–74). In June 1874 Primitivo applied to enter the judiciary, achieving third highest marks in the nationwide competitive examinations for this. In December 1874 he received his first judicial appointment, as the Judge [Juez de primera instancia] of the small hill town of Castrojeriz (Burgos), where he remained until 1881.

== The Judge of Castrojeriz ==
Primitivo's appointment and seven-year stay in Castrojeriz came when the town needed stability, law and order. Carlist insurrections had recently caused outbreaks of civil war in northern Spain, and on 3 June 1874 a group of about 40 mounted Carlist soldiers had entered Castrojeriz, seizing money, goods and hostages. Over twenty years later Primitivo wrote an article in the Diario de Cádiz, ‘Luchas Fratricidas’ [Fratricidal Fighting], describing a particular atrocity they committed – whether one he personally witnessed, or heard about shortly afterwards, is not clear – when they killed one of the town's senior lawyers and taunted his wife and young son in front of the corpse. At the end of the article Primitivo explains he wrote it ‘since yesterday’s history is a useful lesson for tomorrow’ [‘el ayer en la historia es la provechosa lección del mañana’] and to remind those about to become men that they ought to regard the awful fratricidal fighting of civil war with a truly patriotic horror [‘quisiera solo recordar a los que pronto habrán de ser hombres, el horror verdaderamente patriótico que deberán sentir en su alma hacia las tremendas luchas fratricidas’]. These comments assume a tragic irony given that Primitivo's own son, born the same year he wrote this article, was to be killed during the Spanish Civil War in 1936.

In recognition of his services whilst in Castrojeriz, which included dealing with the complex trial [‘El Proceso de Belbimbre’] in July 1880 of a notorious gang accused of 62 crimes – a string of robberies throughout the provinces of Burgos and Palencia and several murders, including that of the parish priest of Belbimbre – Primitivo was awarded, by a royal decree of 18 October 1880, and at the age of thirty-one, the Cruz de Isabel la Católica es:Gran Cruz de Isabel la Católica (in 1906, on his promotion as Presidente de Sala in Madrid, he was given the higher level of this award, the Gran Cruz de Isabel la Católica).

== Successive appointments ==
Primitivo in Madrid, 1903

After 1881, Primitivo moved a number of times in rapid succession as he was promoted to posts of increasing responsibility, mainly in Andalucia. From Castrojeriz he went to Cabra (Córdoba) es:Cabra (Córdoba), where he was Juez de ascenso (1881–82); he then moved to Cádiz as Magistrado de la Audiencia de lo Criminal (1882–86), then to Utrera (Seville) where he spent the years 1886–92, first as Fiscal and then as Presidente de la Audiencia. Thereafter he briefly held posts in Granada (1892–93), Albacete (1893–94), Huelva (1894) and back in Cádiz (1895). In December 1895 he was posted to the Canary Islands as Fiscal de la Audiencia Territorial de Las Palmas and remained there until March 1897, when he was moved to the north of Spain to be Presidente de Sala de la Audiencia Territorial de Oviedo. He stayed here only nine months, being transferred at his request back to southern Spain in December 1897, to assume the equivalent position in Granada, where he stayed until further promotion took him to Madrid in August 1902.

For the remainder of his career Primitivo was in Madrid, firstly as Presidente de Sección de la Audiencia Judicial de Madrid (1902–06) and then as Presidente de Sala de la Audiencia de Madrid (1906–1910). In November 1910 he was appointed Presidente de la Audiencia Territorial de Madrid. Finally, in February 1911 he was appointed as Magistrado del Tribunal Supremo, a position which entitled him to be addressed as Excelentísimo, though his obituary by Antonio Soto y Hernández relates that informally he was affectionately known to everyone as ‘Don Primitivo’.

== Famous trials ==
Primitivo was involved in a number of high profile trials reported in the regional and national press. These included a complicated case during his time in Cádiz, known as El Crimen de la Algaida, concerning the brutal murder in 1894 of a notorious and unpopular criminal. Two members of the local Guardia Rural, among many others, were implicated in the crime, but the jury ultimately found all the accused not guilty.

Whilst in the Canary Islands in 1896 Primitivo acted as Fiscal in the case of El Crimen de Taganana, a crime of passion on the island of Tenerife in which Irene Ravelo Suárez was accused of murdering her lover – by whom she had a child while her husband was in America – with an axe, causing a massive head wound which led to his death from encephalitic meningitis two months later. She was found guilty of the main charges, but extenuating circumstances led to her receiving a short prison sentence of a year and a day.

Another case, during Primitivo’s time in Granada, was what became known as El Crimen del Castillo de Locubín, a murder in October 1898 which shocked the nation. The victim, killed in a conspiracy between his wife, his son – a priest – and his brother-in-law, was lured to a lonely place far from his village, then poisoned, stabbed and disfigured so as to be unrecognisable. False identity papers were planted on the dead body to throw investigators onto a false track, and postcards were forged and posted to the real victim’s home village from Granada, saying that he had died of natural causes whilst on a trip to that city. His family went into mourning, the son saying a Requiem Mass for his deceased father, but suspicious neighbours caused a police enquiry to be made which revealed the postcards to be forged and led to the arrest of the three prime suspects, who were found guilty and sentenced to death. Primitivo’s widely praised and eloquent summing up of this case was published in full in the Revista General de Legislación y Jurisprudencia in 1900.

== Murder in Fuencarral Street ==
The most sensational case to come before Primitivo in court was the crime of Fuencarral street, regarding a murder in Madrid in 1902. Primitivo’s summing up was described in the newspaper El Imparcial on 14 February 1903 as “un modelo de oratorio forense y de imparcialidad” [a model of forensic oratory and impartiality]. Cecilia Aznar, a maid of all work, was accused of murdering her eccentric employer, Manuel Pastor y Pastor, by hitting him repeatedly with a flat iron, and stealing a large amount of cash from him. She then fled by train to Barcelona, where she went on a spending spree with two male friends before being captured, after a massive nationwide hunt for her, near the French border. The case received enormous publicity because of the strange character of the victim, a wealthy and deeply religious convert to Protestantism who lived a frugal life punctuated by desperate attempts to seduce women. Brought back to Madrid for trial, Cecilia – whose three-year-old illegitimate son, whom she had given to her mother to raise, was dramatically brought into the courtroom in an attempt to gain the jury’s sympathy – alleged that she killed in self-defence as Pastor had tried to rape her, but it was proved that he must have been recumbent and asleep when the attack began. Found guilty, Cecilia was sentenced to death, but her sentence was commuted on appeal to life imprisonment. A fictionalised account of the case by Blanca Bertrand was published in 1986 as El Otro Crimen de la Calle de Fuencarral, Primitivo featuring in the chapters dealing with the court hearing and sentencing.

== Publications ==
Throughout his career Primitivo wrote extensively on a wide range of legal topics. He contributed at least fifty articles (plus over fifty book reviews) to the professional journal La Revista General de Legislación y Jurisprudencia, beginning in 1871 when he was 22 years old. The subject of his first article, on the need to provide legal aid for poor litigants [El beneficio de pobreza para pleitos], and of the final one published forty years later in 1911, arguing that loitering and begging are a social problem which cannot be regarded as a crime [Sociología criminal: la vagancia y la mendicidad no pueden ser material de delito], are an indication of his lifelong social concerns. Other articles by him deal with issues such as determining the age at which a child can be held responsible for a crime; civil matrimony and illegitimate children; provisional sentencing; sleepwalking and whether it exempts from criminal responsibility; accidents at work and workers’ rights; the eviction of tenants; the influence of passion in crimes; fraud; madness and imbecility; and juvenile delinquency. He also contributed many articles to the 30-volume Enciclopedia Jurídica Española and to other journals such as La Revista de los Tribunales, though Soto y Hernández points out that Primitivo signed many of these, out of modesty, with the initial ‘A’ alone.

In 1880 Primitivo entered a literary competition run by La Casa de Cervantes in Valladolid, winning a silver medal for his essay (published as a pamphlet the same year), Influencia de la Prensa en la Civilización de los Pueblos [Influence of the Press on the Civilisation of Peoples], in which he argues a strong case in favour of the press and its civilising influence on the development of nations and communities.

Published in Cádiz in 1890, Primitivo’s book on the new electoral law which would extend the vote to all adult males, Ley electoral por sufragio universal sancionada en 26 de junio de 1890 [Electoral law for universal suffrage, approved 26 June 1890], contained his explanatory introduction followed by the full text of this landmark law.

1893 saw the publication of the text book which did most to establish Primitivo’s long-term reputation as an exceptionally able legal writer: Tratado de la Prueba en Material Criminal, a new Spanish version of a key book on criminal evidence by Professor C.J.A. Mittermaier of the University of Heidelberg, first published in German in 1834. Containing very extensive appendices by Primitivo on Spanish law, further editions under his name were published in 1901, 1906, 1916 and 1929 (editions published in Argentina in 1993, 1999 and 2006 continue to credit Primitivo on the title page, but those published in Spain in 1959 and thereafter no longer do so).

As Primitivo’s career advanced he was increasingly asked to write prefaces or introductions to books written by others, such as Carlos López de Haro, Pío de Frutos de Córdoba, Santiago Senarega and Luis Zapatero González (see Bibliography for details).

== Criminal Sociology ==
The most influential and well-known introduction which Primitivo wrote was the extensive one for ‘Sociología Criminal’ [Criminal Sociology], the 1907 Spanish translation of a book by Enrico Ferri, first published in Italian in 1884. Primitivo admires and agrees with many of Ferri's Positivist theories about the need for crime prevention rather than punishment, and to take social and economic factors into account when identifying the causes of criminality. Research and a growing body of evidence was undermining the traditional Classical school which, since antiquity, had held that crime sprang from a moral choice freely made by individuals, who needed to be held personally responsible for their acts and receive penal correction or punishment for their crimes in order to be rehabilitated and reformed.

However, whilst endorsing many of the new Positivist ideas, Primitivo strongly rejects the theories of the anthropological Positivists, such as Ferri's mentor Cesare Lombroso, concerning the physiognomy of criminals and scientific claims to be able to identify and classify criminal types from phrenology (bumps in skull shapes, for example, allegedly indicating a propensity towards crime, or even a biological certainty that someone would commit crimes). Primitivo's views were informed, by this stage in his life, by well over 30 years of personal experience in dealing with criminals under the legal system. According to Primitivo, biological and hereditary factors might have some bearing on producing criminal behaviour, but it is the environmental, social and economic factors which are far more important and – crucially – even then, some degree of free will is always involved (except in cases of insanity or involuntary states such as sleepwalking). Though he admires Ferri's theories, Primitivo does not believe them to be completely scientific and universal explanations of the causes of criminality. He argues that criminology itself is an evolving science which cannot be defined by any set of unchanging dogma. In so doing he rejects both the Positivists and the opposing traditional school of Classical criminologists, and aligns himself with a growing body of ‘eclecticists’ whose views were, in the main, to prevail.

== Two marriages ==
Primitivo married twice, first to Eladia López de Iturralde, who died in Cádiz in June 1884. She was the daughter of the Burgos notary, Plácido López de Iturralde, who moved to Cádiz province in 1875. In 1886 when he was aged thirty-seven, Primitivo married a second time, this time to María de los Angeles Rubio de Artecona (1858–1942), known as Angeles. Angeles was the eldest daughter of the Marqueses de Casa Rábago and the wedding took place in the private oratory of their house in Cádiz (calle Verónica 13) on 4 October 1886.

Angeles came from a well-connected family which had many links with the legal profession. She was the daughter of a lawyer, Joaquín Rubio y Bosichy (1826–1888), Abogado del ilustre Colegio de Cádiz, Auditor honorario de la Marina and holder of various other awards and honorary positions; his mother descended from the Greek Counts of Morea-Bosichi, while his father, Joaquín Rubio y Muñoz (1788–1874), was Escribano público [Notary Public] for Cádiz and a well-known antiquarian and numismatist. Angeles's mother was María Josefa de Artecona y de Lafuente (1830–1905), third Marquesa de Casa Rábago and granddaughter of the Cádiz philanthropist María Josefa Fernández de Rábago O’Ryan (1775–1861), second Marquesa and President for 34 years of the Junta de Damas [Ladies’ Committee], who was in the forefront of the movement to set up and support the first free schools for poor girls and infants in the city.

== Children ==
Primitivo and Angeles had three children who lived to adulthood (a fourth, José Luis, died as a child in 1897). Their eldest daughter, Josefina (Josefina María de los Angeles Consolación Joaquina Felisa González del Alba y Rubio), was born in Cádiz on 9 November 1892 and died in Madrid, aged 88, on 16 May 1981. In 1916 she married John Farrell, an employee of the Rio Tinto Company for 47 years and British Pro-Consul in Madrid during the crisis of 1936–37. In honour of her father Primitivo – and of John's father, James – their eldest son, born in 1917, was named James Primitivo Farrell. He moved to England and married Gwendolen Mary Morgans, in 1940. They had four children: Josephine, Janet, Jerome and Julian. James had a career in the army and died in 1985. Josefina and John had a second son, Luis John, and a daughter who died in infancy, Josefina Lucy.

On 16 August 1895 Angeles gave birth, also in Cádiz, to Angel (Angel Joaquín Manuel González del Alba y Rubio). He married Gloria Baraja Arias in 1923 and had four children, Gloria, María Eugenia, Angel and Manuel. Entering the army in August 1913, just weeks before Primitivo's death, he later rose to be Comandante de Estado Mayor. In the Civil War, during intense fighting near Toledo on 27 October 1936, he crossed (with over 100 others) from the Republican to the Nationalist lines as the latter made advances towards Madrid, but was executed four days later, aged 41.

The youngest daughter of Primitivo and Angeles was María Luisa (María Luisa González del Alba y Rubio), born 20 April 1899 in Granada. She married Joaquín Moreno and had two children, María de los Angeles and José Joaquín, and died in Madrid on 16 February 1969, aged 69.

== Illness and death ==
After the courts had shut down for the summer recess in 1913, Primitivo left the capital with his family to spend some weeks back in his native Burgos, knowing that he was seriously ill with an incurable disease of the liver. A few days before leaving Madrid for the final time, Primitivo wrote the last piece he had published, of a different nature from his other works. It is the short preface to a novel called Sueños de Amor [Dreams of Love] by his friend Aurelio Canudo. Beginning abruptly with “Enfermedad amarga y tenebrosa me tiene dolorido. Entreveo un final desagradable” [“A bitter and dismal illness is afflicting me. I foresee an unpleasant ending”], Primitivo says that he has still not given up all hope of living longer, since when least you expect it, like a bud bursting into leaf, a new lease of life can appear. Canudo, he explains, is like himself the son of an officer in the Guardia Civil, and has written articles defending this organisation, making him popular with its members. As the book does not deal with matters of law, he cannot give a general ruling on its merit but in his personal opinion it is a good novel, Canudo excelling in a style which contains ironic truths. Primitivo ends with the wish that the literary critics will get as much pleasure out of it as he has himself when reading it during hours of sharp pain and gloomy moments of sickness [“¡Quiera Dios que la censura de los maestros corre parejas con el gusto con que yo la he leído, en horas de amargo dolor y en ratos de tenebrosa dolencia!”].

Primitivo's condition rapidly worsened at the end of the summer and during the first week in September various newspapers reported that he was gravely ill and had been given the last rites. On 7 September he died, aged 64, in the same parish in which he had been born. Several obituaries pointed out that he had enjoyed enviable good health throughout his life, but that the liver complaint which had appeared at the beginning of 1913 finally overcame him, after many days of atrocious suffering which he bore with exemplary resignation [muchos dias de sufrimientos atroces, soportados con ejemplar resignación]. His burial took place the following day in the cemetery of San José in Burgos, the priest who officiated being his nephew (son of his sister Petra), don Miguel Polo y González del Alba. Almost thirty years later, in 1942, the body of Angeles was brought from Madrid, where she had died aged 84, to join that of her husband.

== Posthumous publication of ‘Estudios Jurídicos’ ==
Detail from cover of Estudios Jurídicos

Primitivo’s book, ‘Estudios Jurídicos’, which was at the printers when he died, was published posthumously a few weeks later with the addition of an obituary by the Editor-in-Chief of the Revista de los Tribunales, Antonio Soto y Hernández. The book comprises Primitivo's views on a wide range of issues, paraphrased below.

A chapter on criminality gives its causes as predominantly social. To prevent juvenile delinquency young children must be provided with an ethical education which goes well beyond basic literacy skills, so as to awaken in them a latent aesthetic awareness, fostering self-respect and an understanding of moral values which will encourage the development of noble and altruistic aspirations. As mothers, women play a key role in the spiritual development of their children. Abandoned and homeless children, or those who are already delinquent, ought not be oppressed and punished but provided with this sort of education, in residential institutions if necessary. Criminals of full age are more likely to reform if conditional sentences are imposed more often by the courts, with sentence reductions and early release for good behaviour. At the time he is writing, these are still fairly recent innovations and so are only just starting to make a difference in society, but in Primitivo's view they must be more actively pursued. There is a need to combat the inertia of those who will not make the effort to implement more progressive policies.

Another section deals with the need for crime prevention through addressing the problem of alcohol dependency, a factor in up to 35% of crimes, especially those of violence. Urban poverty, poor housing and oppressively long working hours make the tavern a source of refuge and escape from misery but often cause the destruction of health, morals and family life. Government initiatives are needed to provide better housing for the working classes. The civic authorities should not see alcohol sales primarily in terms of the taxes they raise but should pay more attention to the poor health and crime they often create. Some sociologists advocate total prohibition, or the sale of alcohol only in certain licensed shops, but Primitivo favours the approach in Switzerland and the Netherlands to reduce the number of taverns and to restrict their opening hours, particularly on Sundays and public holidays. He also recommends the greater provision of entertainment, sporting and other leisure amenities for the working classes.

Other chapters deal with concerns over recent changes in the way judicial appointments are made (judges must be appointed and promoted on their professional and intellectual abilities, not through political influence), the benefits of provisional and suspended sentences, and the circumstances under which it is justifiable for the jury to be informed, during a trial, about other connected crimes which the accused has committed or is alleged to have committed.

== Obituaries and assessment of character ==
Obituaries appeared in numerous national and provincial newspapers as well as in the various legal journals. In these, and in several character studies printed during his lifetime (such as Semblanzas Jurídicas in 1906 and articles in the Diario de Las Palmas on 12 May 1896 and in La Opinión de Tenerife on 23 May 1896), there is a consensus that Primitivo was extremely hardworking, adept at quickly grasping highly complex legal cases and at maintaining absolute impartiality. His courtroom speeches were enlightened, sober, convincing, inspired and naturally eloquent, and avoided artificial and obscure language. He also gave widely praised public lectures, such as those to the Ateneo de Cádiz in 1895 and 1896, to the Ateneo de Granada in 1900 and to the Ateneo de Madrid es:Ateneo de Madrid in 1912. In personality he was enthusiastic and not prone to depressive influences, modest and not ambitious, and had 'not an atom of vanity' [sin un átomo de vanidad]. His private conversation was entertaining and he was not condescending to young people, who constantly sought his advice on personal as well as professional matters. Physically he is described by Soto y Hernández as tall and sturdy, his photograph showing him to be distinguished-looking, and with a lively countenance and features which, ‘in some of their profiles, remind one of a 16th-century hidalgo’ [el retrato...en algunos de sus perfiles, recuerda el de un hidalgo del siglo XVI]. That he had a sense of fun is suggested by his participation, aged 63, in the Madrid carnival parade in February 1912, his decorated float or carriage bearing the banner: “¡Hola! ¡Ya estamos aqui!” [Hello! We’re here already!] and its occupants being dressed up as ‘pierrots’.

Politically liberal and progressive, his writings make few references to religion, but in his article on the atrocity in Castrojeriz he mentions that as a man of Christian beliefs he abhors ignorance and fanaticism, which destroy the wise teachings of the sublime Catholic faith [‘las sabias enseñanzas de la sublime fe católica’]. Though sympathetic to many of the ideas of Positivism regarding the causes of crime, he maintains that even the most wretched and degenerate criminal retains some element of the divine creative breath [‘el soplo de Dios’].

During his lifetime Primitivo was most widely known from his involvement in famous criminal trials, but his most lasting legacy is to be found in his body of legal writings and in his contribution to the contemporary ideological debates on criminology and sociology – many aspects of which remain topical and relevant in the 21st century. Unlike most other theorists in these fields, Primitivo could draw on extensive first-hand experience of criminals caught up in the legal process, when seeking to identify the main underlying causes of crime. He was convinced that most problems stemmed from the environment in which children were brought up, as is exemplified by an article he wrote in 1897 entitled Los Golfos [yobs or young vagabonds]. In this he makes an eloquent and passionate plea to his readers not to condemn urban street children who sleep rough and get into trouble; sociologists theorise about them, legislators pass laws about them and the legal system tries to deal with them, but they remain in the public eye as a constant reproach to society. They ought to be treated with humanity and compassion; love towards the child, when coupled with the advantages of a good education, is precisely the key needed to unlock the greatest problems of the science of sociology in times to come [en el amor al niño y en su educación provechosa, está precisamente la clave de los más grandes problemas de la ciencia de la sociología en lo futuro de los tiempos].

== Bibliography ==
Works by Primitivo González del Alba:

El juicio oral y público: observaciones sobre su planteamiento, Imprenta de la Revista de Legislación, Madrid 1876

Guía del propietario: disposiciones legales y vigentes sobre el arrendamiento y el desahucio, Hijos de Rodríguez, Valladolid 1878

Influencia de la Prensa en la Civilización de los Pueblos, La Casa de Cervantes en Valladolid, Hijos de Rodríguez, Valladolid 1880

El Proceso de Belbimbre: observaciones sobre la causa instruida con motivo de los robos y homicidios ejecutados en Belbimbre y otros pueblos de las provincias de Burgos y Palencia, Serie 'Procesos célebres de actualidad', Hijos de Rodríguez, Valladolid 1881

Ley electoral por sufragio universal sancionada en 26 de junio de 1890, Ildefonso Prieto y Luque, Cádiz 1890

Tratado de la Prueba en Material Criminal, Spanish translation with extensive appendices by Primitivo González del Alba of the work by Professor C. J. A. von Mittermaier first published in German in 1834 (as Die Lehre vom Beweise im deutschen Strafprozesse... in Vergleichung mit den Ansichten des englischen und französischen Strafverfahrens), 1893 and various subsequent editions

Luchas Fratricidas, in Impresiones y Recuerdos: articulos publicados en el Diario de Cádiz, Imprenta de la Revista Médica, Cádiz 1895

La Imputabilidad: conferencia de D. Primitivo González del Alba, celebrada en el Ateneo de Cádiz el día 10 de diciembre de 1895, Talleres Tipográficos de Manuel Alvarez, José R. de Santa Cruz, Cádiz 1896

La imputabilidad ante las escuelas antropológicas: estudio de derecho penal, Imprenta de la Revista de Legislación, Madrid 1896

Los Golfos, article in El Diario de Tenerife, 28 April 1897

Preface to Solemnidad taquigráfica: verificada el domingo 28 de mayo de 1899 en la Abadía del Sacro-monte, para la concesión de títulos de peritos en taquigrafía a los Sres. alumnos del Sacro-monte de Granada, Viuda é Hijos de Paulino V. Sabatel, Granada 1900

Preface to La Función Judicial, Carlos López de Haro, Editorial de Góngora, Madrid 1904

Introduction to Sociología Criminal, Enrico Ferri, translated by Antonio Soto y Hernández, Editorial de Góngora, Madrid 1907 (reprinted by Analecta Editorial, Pamplona 2005)

Introduction to Justicia Municipal: Ley 5 de Agosto 1907 reorganizando la administración de justicia en los juzgados y tribunales municipales, Santiago Senarega, Hijos de Tomás Minuesa, Madrid 1907

Preface to Nueva compilación de la doctrina sobre competencias entre la Administración y los Tribunales de Justicio y Recursos de Queja, Pío de Frutos de Córdoba, Diputación Provincial, Segovia 1907

La Condena Condicional: Ley de 17 de Marzo de 1908, Hijos de Reus, Madrid 1908

Preface to Glosas a la Ley de Justicia Municipal, Luis Zapatero González, Imprenta de Agapito Zapatero, Valladolid 1909

Estudios Jurídicos, Editorial de Góngora, Madrid 1913

Preface to Sueños de Amor, Aurelio Canudo, La Editora, Madrid 1914

Obituaries:

ABC (Madrid), 8 September 1913

Diario de Burgos, 8 and 9 September 1913

El Defensor de Granada, 9 September 1913

El Liberal, 8 September 1913

El Reformista (Cádiz), 10 September 1913

La Opinión (Cabra), 14 September 1913

Revista de los Tribunales, 12 September 1913 (reproduced in Estudios Jurídicos)

Revista General de Legislación y Jurisprudencia, volume 123, 1913

Other sources of information about Primitivo González del Alba:

Historia de la Criminología en España, Alfonso Serrano Gómez, Dykinson, Madrid 2007 [pp 121–122 and 410-411 are specifically on Primitivo, whose name is given incorrectly both as González de Alba and as González Alba]

La Imputabilidad en el Derecho Penal español: imputabilidad y locura en la España del siglo XIX, Joaquín González González, Editorial Comares, Granada 1994 [pp 209–212, subtitled La teoría de la imputabilidad en Primitivo González del Alba]

El Otro Crimen de la Calle de Fuencarral, Blanca Bertrand, Ediciones Albia, Madrid 1986 [chapters XI and XII]

Gerechtigkeit verwalten: Die spanische Justiz im Übergang zur Moderne, Johannes-Michael Scholz, Vittorio Klostermann, Frankfurt am Main 2003 [pp 1035–1039 deal with Primitivo, whose name is given incorrectly throughout as González de Alba]

Escritores Burgaleses, Fr. Licinio Ruiz OSA & Julián García Sáinz de Baranda, Imprenta de la Escuela de Reforma, Alcalá de Henares 1930, p. 218

Semblanzas Jurídicas, Juan Antonio Galvarriato, volume 1, 1906

La Correspondencia de España, 29 June 1884: report on front page of the funeral of Eladia López de Iturralde; 19 February 1912, article on Madrid Carnival Parade

Photographs of Primitivo González del Alba appear in:

Nuevo Mundo, 25 February 1903: in article on the trial of Cecilia Aznar [name given incorrectly as González de Alba]

La Alhambra (Granada), 15 April 1903: number 43 in a photographic montage of editors and contributors to El Defensor de Granada

ABC, 12 February 1903; 17 and 19 November 1910; and 8 September 1913, opposite his obituary

El Liberal, portrait sketch used 9 and 14 February 1903 and 20 June 1903

Estudios Jurídicos, 1913, title page

Revista General de Legislación y Jurisprudencia, volume 123, 1913, with obituary
