= José Genaro Villanova y Jiménez =

Spanish politician and businessman

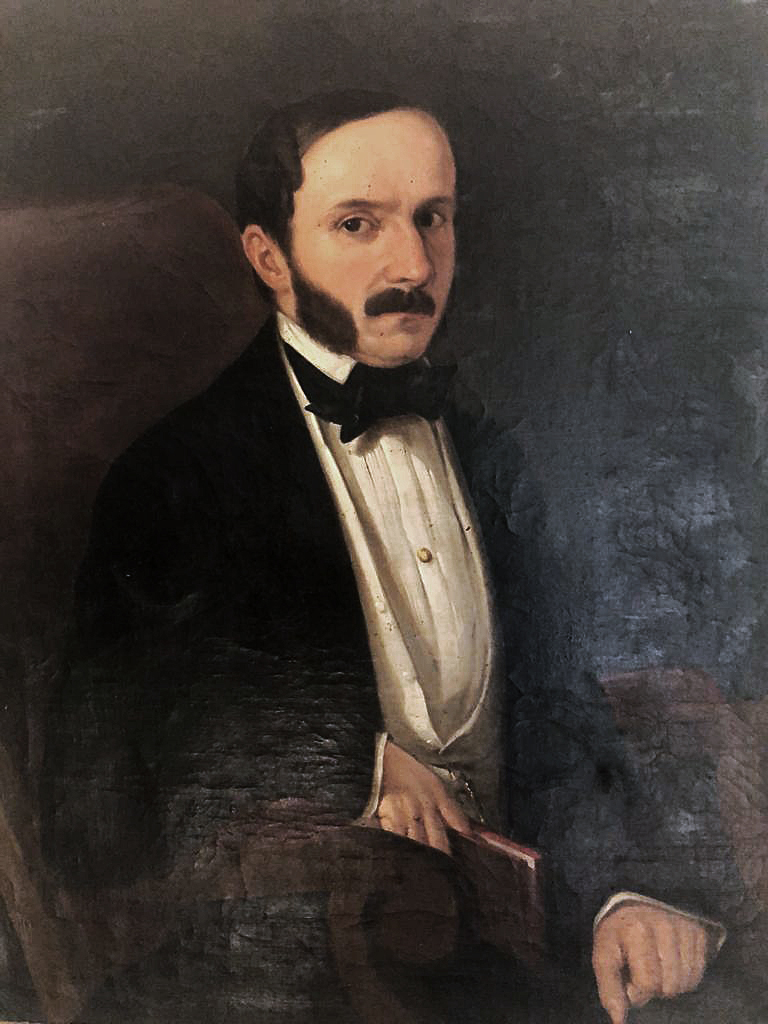
- Born: José Genaro Villanova y Jiménez; September 19, 1813; Gójar, Granada
- Died: April 2, 1884 (aged 70); Villacarrillo, Jaén
- Occupations: Politician, businessman
- Awards: Knight of 1st Class of the Order of San Luis de Parma, Chamberlain of Isabel II

José Genaro Villanova y Jiménez (Goxar de la Vega, Granada 1813 - Colonia del Teatino Villacarrillo, Jaén, 1884) was a Spanish politician and businessman, senator of the Kingdom and deputy to the Cortes for Granada in various legislatures under the crown of Isabel II and senator under the reign of Alfonso XII.

Of humble origin, the son of farmers, he was a prominent conservative politician and businessman. He completed his studies at the Seminary of Granada but redirected his career to law. He obtained his law degree from the University of Granada, later entering the Public Administration.

== Political career ==
- Deputy for Almería between 1857 and 1858.
- Deputy for Granada in various legislatures, between 1858 and 1868.
- Senator for the province of Granada in 1872.
- Senator for the province of Jaén between 1876 and 1877.
- Senator for the province of Granada in 1877, but opted for senator of the University of Granada.
- Senator for the Economic Society of Seville between 1879 and 1880. Also between 1881 and 1882.

== Titles and positions ==
- Chamberlain of Isabel II.
- Knight of 1st class of the Order of San Luis de Parma.

== Biography ==
José Genaro was the son of Bernardino Onésimo Villanova López, a small farmer who worked the land inherited from his parents and other fields of the Marquis of Guadalcázar, under sharecropping. José Genaro was the second of eight siblings, which made it difficult for him to access any type of education. Thanks to the intervention and guardianship of the parish priest of Gójar, he was able to access the seminary of Granada.

After completing his formation in the seminary, he entered the faculty of Law in Granada, subsequently practicing law in Granada and Almería upon obtaining his degree. During this period of practicing law, he expanded his studies at the San Indalecio college in Almería. Later, in the years 1847-48 and taking advantage of his stay in Barcelona as an employee of the Public Administration, he attended lectures on agriculture and botany.

He entered the Public Administration, where he had already worked since 1831 as an "unpaid meritorious" in the Accounting Office of Granada, starting a long career in the Ministry of Finance.

Later he achieved the official category and salary corresponding to his class, rising according to his rank, holding:

In 1835, he was appointed official of the Accounting Office for Taxes and Levies on Amortizations of the province of Granada.

In 1837, he was transferred to Almería, with the same position. Parallelly, he was also appointed secretary of the board for the alienation of buildings and effects of the suppressed convents in the province of Almería by the disentailment of Mendizabal.

In 1868, he was appointed director general of accounting of the kingdom.

Aside from his administrative and political activity, he was vice president of the Artistic and Literary Lyceum of Almería, a member of the Academies of Natural Sciences and Arts of Barcelona, a member of the economic societies of Friends of the Country of Madrid and Barcelona, a member of the Sevillian Society for emulation and promotion of enlightenment, agriculture, arts, and commerce, a member of the board of directors of the Madrid Savings Bank. He was also a vocal member of the general board of agriculture held in Madrid in 1849.

In 1879, he acquired the Linares Bullring, always privately owned, a city where he already owned another business, such as the Gas Factory.

He was also the administrator of the House of Altamira. He took advantage of the disentailment of the Church to acquire lands in his native Gójar, in Gavia (where he built a large flour factory, still standing) and in La Zubia, adjacent to the lands of Gójar.

He supported and promoted the construction of the Linares mining railway, strongly backing the construction of the Jaén-Almería line.

He was a founder, along with Luis Seco de Lucena Escalada, of the liberal newspaper El Defensor de Granada, with José Genaro providing the financing and Seco de Lucena the technical direction.

He published numerous articles on administrative and economic matters. In the newspapers El Popular in 1847, Las Cortes in 1855, and El Diario Español in 1857 and 58, and in El Cultivador, the latter published in Barcelona by Jaume Llansó from 1848 to 1851.

== Marriage and descendants ==
José Genaro Villanova married twice: the first time in Almería in 1854 with Encarnación de Campos and in 1856, in Granada, with Dolores de la Cuadra Carrascosa, a wealthy heiress from Jaén. He had four children: his firstborn from his first marriage José Villanova de Campos, a civil engineer; and three more from the second: Luis, who was a mining engineer and married Princess Isabel Roma Rattazzi Bonaparte Wyse; Juan, who also became a senator; and Francisco, a lawyer from the University of Granada.
