= Fernando Prieto =

Spanish political scientist

Fernando Prieto Martínez (1933 – Madrid, November 2006) was a Spanish political scientist, professor of the History of Ideas, and director of the Centro de Estudios Políticos y Constitucionales.

In 1974, he became a professor with the Faculty of Political Science and Sociology at the Complutense University of Madrid. He had planned to establish himself as a researcher when Prime Minister Adolfo Suárez asked him to convert an old Francoist organization (the Instituto de Estudios Políticos) into a modern think-tank that would help Spain achieve its transition to Democracy. The organization was renamed and Prieto became its first director.

Upon leaving the directorship, Prieto returned to the academic world. He became especially well known for his studies of Seneca and Hegel. He was the president of the "Coordinadora Estatal para la Reforma de la Ley Electoral" (CERLE), an organization devoted to promoting participatory democracy and increasing citizen involvement in the legislative process.

== Selected works ==
- La Revolución Francesa, Istmo (1989) ISBN 84-7090-202-4
- Manual de Historia de las Teorías Politicas, Union Editorial ISBN 84-7209-303-4
- Historia de las Ideas y Formas Políticas, 5 vols., Union Editorial. Vol.1, Edad Antigua ISBN 84-7209-448-0; Vol.2, Edad Media ISBN 84-7209-329-8; Vol.3, Edad Moderna ISBN 84-7209-247-X; Vol.4, Edad Contemporanea (El Romanticismo) ISBN 84-7209-363-8; Vol.5, Edad Contemporanea (El Positivismo) ISBN 84-7209-424-3
