= Regenerationism =

Intellectual and political movement in late 19th century and early 20th century Spain

Regenerationism (Spanish: Regeneracionismo) was an intellectual and political movement in late 19th century and early 20th century Spain. It sought to make objective and scientific study of the causes of Spain's decline as a nation and to propose remedies. It is largely seen as distinct from another movement of the same time and place, the Generation of '98. While both movements shared a similar negative judgment of the course of Spain as a nation in recent times, the regenerationists sought to be objective, documentary, and scientific, while the Generation of '98 inclined more to the literary, subjective and artistic.

The most prominent representative of Regenerationism was the Aragonese politician Joaquín Costa with his maxim "School, larder and double-lock the tomb of El Cid" ("Escuela, despensa y doble llave al sepulcro del Cid"): that is, look to the future and let go of the grand triumphal narrative that begins with El Cid.

== Origin ==
The word regeneración entered the Spanish language in the early 19th century as a medical term, the antonym of corrupción (corruption). Over time, it became a metaphor for the opposite of political corruption and a new expression of the longstanding patriotic concern with the decline of Spain, a concern first expressed by the Arbitristas in the 16th and 17th centuries, then by Enlightenment thinkers and Bourbon reformers in the 18th century, sometimes satirised in the form of so-called Proyectismo ("Project-ism") attacked by José Cadalso in his Cartas marruecas ("Moroccan Letters").

However, in the late 19th century, Regenerationism was specifically a reaction against the political system founded by Cánovas under the Bourbon restoration. Under the Cánovas system, alternation between conservative and liberal parties was guaranteed by rigged elections. That made the late 19th century, after the last of the Carlist Wars, a period of an illusory stability sustained on the basis of massive political corruption. That hid, for a time, the misery of the common people, the poor economic distribution of Spain's belated Industrial Revolution, caciquism, and the triumph of an economic and political oligarchy. Only Catalonia and the Basque Country had seen the sustained rise of an industrial capitalist bourgeoisie (the early industrialization in Andalusia having largely failed). With the end of feudalism and, in particular, the fraud-ridden expropriation of ecclesiastical properties (such as the Ecclesiastical Confiscations of Mendizábal), and the failure of land reform efforts, practically all of Spain's potentially productive farmland was under unproductive use in latifundia (large estates). Wages were low, and many Spaniards were day labourers lived on the edge of hunger.

Regenerationism was strongly influenced by Krausism, the philosophy of Karl Christian Friedrich Krause, which proclaimed freedom of conscience. Introduced into Spain by Julián Sanz del Río, Krausism was very influential among liberal reformers in that country throughout the 19th century (combining with positivism in the latter portion of the century). Today, Regenerationism survives mostly as a component of Aragonese nationalism for which it has long provided an ideological foundation.

== Magazines ==
The Regenerationist intellectuals wished to form a new, authentic idea of Spain, to which end they attempted to expose the deceptions of official Spain by disseminating studies in widely circulated magazines. Many of these predated those publications associated with the Generation of '98. The first was the Revista Contemporánea (1875–1907), founded by José del Perojo. Among its initial collaborators were numerous scholars associated with the Krausist Institución Libre de Enseñanza (Free Institute of Instruction), an independent institution of higher education founded in Madrid in 1876. Among these were Rafael Altamira, Julián Sanz del Río, Rafael María de Labra, and Urbano González Serrano, who imported contemporary European aesthetic and philosophical currents and propagated them within Spain breaking links with Spanish cultural tradition. Another prestigious publication was La España Moderna (1889–1914). Founded by José Lázaro Galdiano, it sought to be Spain's Revue des deux mondes. Like Revista Contemporánea, it sought to be cosmopolitan, European, and contemporary. Among its collaborators were Ramiro de Maeztu and Miguel de Unamuno. Another Regenerationist magazine was Nuevo Teatro Crítico ("New Critical Theater"), written almost entirely by literary theorist Emilia Pardo Bazán, who was Europeanist as well as sincerely feminist.

== Regenerationist writers ==
The Regenerationist writers published studies and essays that denounced the corrupt Canovist system. This was given particular evidence and impetus by the defeat of Spain's technically obsolete military in the Spanish–American War of 1898, when Spain lost virtually all that remained of its empire (losing Cuba, Puerto Rico, the Philippines and several smaller island possessions).

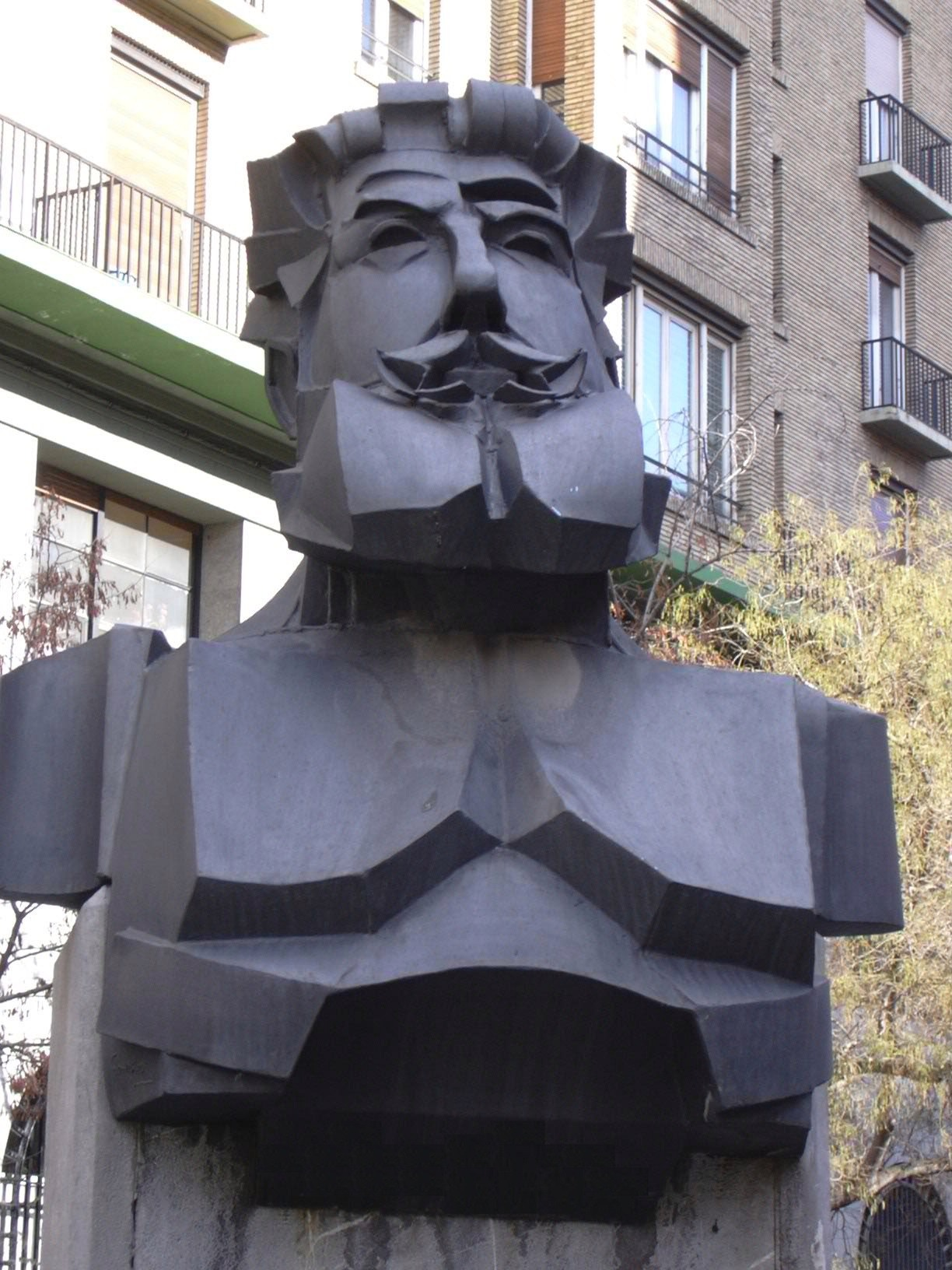
Statue of Joaquín Costa in Zaragoza.

The way had been somewhat prepared by Lucas Mallada's Los males de la patria y la futura revolución española ("The ills of the country and the future Spanish revolution", 1890) and Ricardo Macías Picavea's El problema nacional ("The national problem"), as well as Krausist attacks on illiteracy and official state pedagogy, most notably as led by the Institución Libre de Enseñanza directed by Francisco Giner de los Ríos.

The most important author (and political figure) of this movement was Joaquín Costa. He caused a commotion with his works Colectivismo agrario en España ("Agrarian Collectivism in Spain", 1898) and Oligarquía y caciquismo como la forma actual de gobierno en España ("Oligarchy and caciquism as the current form of the Spanish government", 1901).

Later, a constellation of authors would follow Costa's road. Rafael Altamira (1866–1951) wrote Psicología del pueblo español ("Psychology of the Spanish people", 1902), where he conceived patriotism as a spiritual concept innate in peoples. Other past authors claimed as proto-Regenerationists were Juan Ginés de Sepúlveda, Francisco de Quevedo, Benito Jerónimo Feijoo, and others.

Lucas Mallada strongly criticized the Idearium español proposed by Ángel Ganivet and addressed French Hispanophobia as a grave evil, countered somewhat by German Hispanophilia. He defended Spanish activity in the Americas and believed that its reputation had improved, despite inadequate attention to its own affairs. He rejected the pessimism of Ricardo Macías Picavea (1847–1899) in the latter's El problema nacional. Rejecting Macías Picavea's call for a dictatorship, he sympathized instead with the 18th century satirist Juan Pablo Forner and with Joaquín Costa, who sought to reform Spain's democracy. He separated national life from the mere poor example set by its leaders, and summarized the national failings as:

1. lack of patriotism
2. self-contempt
3. absence of common interest
4. lack of a concept of independence
5. undervaluing tradition

Similar views can be found in the work of the Castilian-Leonese writer José María Salaverría (1873–1940), author of Vieja España ("Old Spain", 1907).

The ideals and proposals of the Regenerationists were seized upon by conservative politicians such as Francisco Silvela, whose famous article "Sin pulso" ("Without a pulse") was published in El Tiempo 16 August 1898, and Antonio Maura, who saw Regenerationism as a sufficient vehicle for his political aspirations. At the same time, Regenerationism was equally taken up by liberal politicians such as Santiago Alba, José Canalejas and Manuel Azaña. Benito Pérez Galdós assimilated Regenerationism to his initial Krausism in the final works of his Episodios nacionales and even the dictator Miguel Primo de Rivera appropriated some of Costa's discourse, particularly his call for an "iron surgeon" to accomplish urgently needed national reforms. He brought to fruition at least one of Costa's dreams: a national hydrological plan. But the figures who most prominently prolonged the current of Regenerationism until the outbreak of the Spanish Civil War in 1936 were such writers as Juan Pío Membrado Ejerique, Julio Senador Gómez, Constancio Bernaldo de Quirós, Luis Morote, Ramiro de Maeztu, Pedro Corominas, Adolfo Posada, and José Ortega y Gasset.
