= El Defensor de Granada =

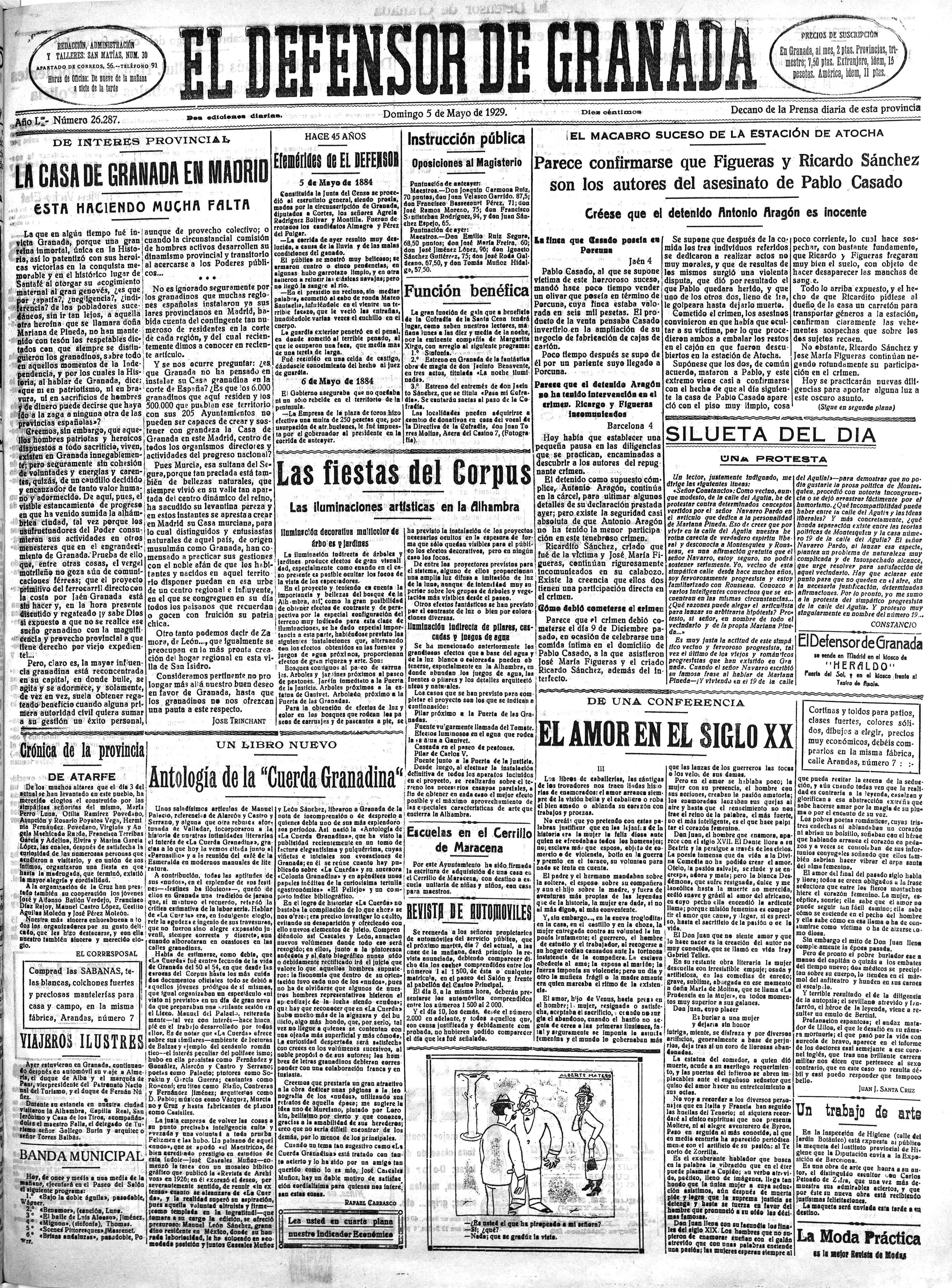
- Type: Daily newspaper
- Founder: Luis Seco de Lucena
- Founded: September 20, 1880
- Ceased publication: July 20, 1936
- Language: Spanish
- Headquarters: Granada
- Country: Spain

El Defensor de Granada (The Defender of Granada) was a Spanish newspaper with liberal-progressive ideology that was published in Granada between the end of the 19th century and the first third of the 20th century. It disappeared after the outbreak of the Spanish Civil War.

From 1907 it belonged to the Sociedad Editorial de España.

== History ==
El Defensor de Granada was founded in 1880 by Luis Seco de Lucena Escalada. In its initial stage the newspaper had the financing and valuable support of José Genaro Villanova, a rich businessman and politician from Granada. Its circulation was limited to the city of Granada. In 1907 it became the property of the Sociedad Editorial de España, subsequently reconstituted as Sociedad Editora Universal. This company already owned other leading national newspapers such as El Imparcial and Heraldo de Madrid.

The newspaper became the main voice for liberalism, secularism, modernization of Spain and political regeneration, which gave it a wide audience and gave it more influence than other newspapers. In 1927 it had a circulation of 12,000 copies a day, which made it the most important newspaper in Granada. In the local journalistic field at that time its main competitors were the Noticiero Granadino, La Publicidad and, to a lesser extent, La Gaceta del Sur.

In the last twelve years of its existence El Defensor de Granada was headed by the eminent writer and journalist Constantino Ruiz Carnero. He was also active in politics and became mayor of Granada for a brief period. After the proclamation of the Second Republic, during the 1930s El Defensor de Granada showed itself clearly sympathetic to the new regime. In these years its main journalistic rival was the Catholic and conservative Ideal newspaper.

At the start of the Spanish Civil War, on July 20, 1936, the Defender of Granada was closed by the military coup leaders and its facilities were raided. The property was seized by the rebel forces. (Note: Falangists Francisco Ocaña and José Molina Plata, from the Falange Press and Propaganda section, were responsible for seizing the facilities.) Its director was arrested days later, on July 27, and killed one day without trial early in August 1936. The repression also affected another of its journalists, Eufrasio Martin, His wife was killed instead of him, since he was not in Granada. The civil war meant, in short, the disappearance of the newspaper.

== Featured contributors ==
Throughout its existence the newspaper had the collaboration of notable figures, including Ángel Ganivet, Paco Seco de Lucena, Francisco de Paula Valladar, Luis Fernández de Córdoba, Federico Olóriz Aguilera, Constantino Ruiz Carnero, Antonio Afán de Ribera, Francisco Javier Simonet, Nicolás María López, Ramón Noguera Bahamonde, Alberto Álvarez de Cienfuegos Cobos, Francisco de Paula Villa-Real, etc.

== Bibliography ==
- Caballero Pérez, Miguel; Góngora Ayala, Pilar (2007), Historia de una familia. La verdad sobre el asesinato de García Lorca, Madrid: Ibersaf
- Checa Godoy, Antonio (1989), Prensa y partidos políticos durante la II República, University of Salamanca, ISBN 84-7481-521-5
- Correa Ramón, Amelina (2000), Literatura en Granada, 1898-1998, Diputación Provincial de Granada
- De las Heras Pedrosa, Carlos (2000), La prensa del movimiento y su gestión publicitaria, 1936-1984, Universidad de Málaga, doi:10.5281/zenodo.2603453
- Gibson, Ian (1981), El Asesinato de Federico García Lorca, Barcelona: Editorial Bruguera
- Preston, Paul (2013) [2011], El Holocausto Español. Odio y Exterminio en la Guerra Civil y después, Barcelona: Debolsillo
- Reig García, Ramón (2011), La comunicación en Andalucía: Historia, estructura y nuevas tecnologías, Seville: Centro de Estudios Andaluces, ISBN 978-84-939078-0-8
- Ruiz Sánchez, José-Leonardo (2005), Catolicismo y comunicación en la historia contemporánea, Universidad de Sevilla
- Sáiz, María Dolores; Seoane, María Cruz (1996), Historia del periodismo en España 3. El Siglo XX: 1898-1936, Alianza
