= Palace of Marqués de Grimaldi =

- Palacio del Marqués de Grimaldi (Spanish)
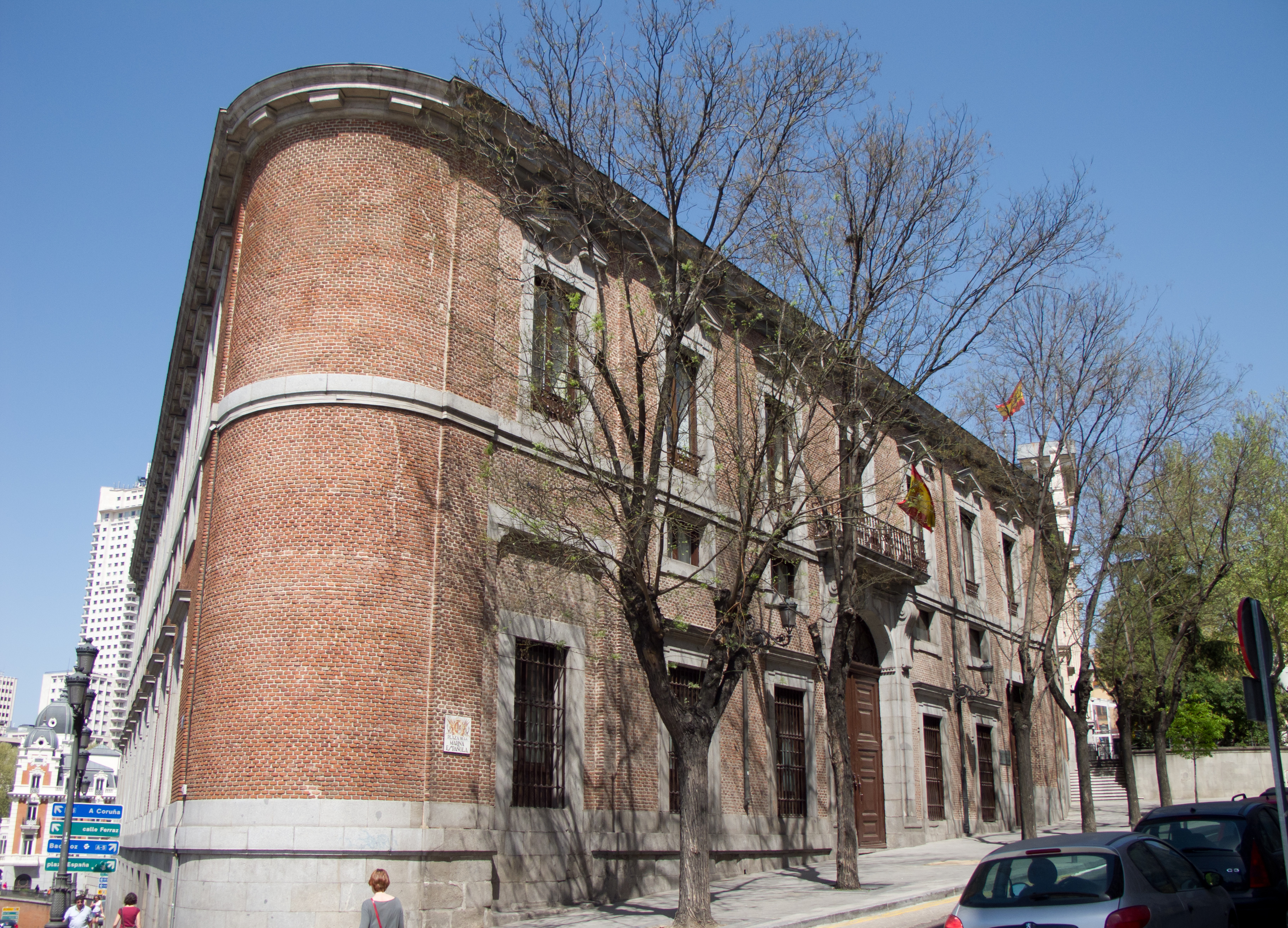

- Location within Spain
- 40.420627°N 3.712498°W
- Location: Madrid, Spain

Spanish Cultural Heritage
- Official name: Palacio del Marqués de Grimaldi
- Type: Non-movable
- Criteria: Monument
- Designated: 2000
- Reference no.: RI-51-0009583

The Palace of Marqués de Grimaldi (Spanish: Palacio del Marqués de Grimaldi) is a palace located in Madrid, Spain. It was declared Bien de Interés Cultural in 2000.

== History ==
Also called the Godoy Palace (Spanish : Palacio de Godoy), it is a stately residence located in Madrid on Calle de Bailén near the Royal Palace and next to the Senate. It was designed by Francisco Sabatini and constructed between 1776 and 1782. Occupied for a few years by Manuel Godoy, at present the palace is the headquarters of the Center for Political and Constitutional Studies, an agency of the Ministry of the Presidency, Justice and Relations with the Courts.

The building was designed by Francisco Sabatini by order of Carlos III, who wanted to build a dignified residence for his Secretary of State, Jerónimo Grimaldi, 1st Duke of Grimaldi, in the surroundings of the Royal Palace. The new palace was located between the Colegio de Doña María de Aragón (current home of the Senate) and the planned Calle Nueva (current Calle Bailén). Sabatini used stone and brick, combining these materials in the style of other monuments that he had designed in the capital, such as the Royal Customs House. Despite giving the building its popular name, the Marquis de Grimaldi was not the first to inhabit the Palace of the Secretaries of State, but instead his successor, the Count of Floridablanca, in 1782.

During the Second Republic, it was proposed to establish the Museum of Popular Art and the Museum of Cars (the royal carriages from the demolished Royal Stables) in the vicinity of the Royal Palace. To this end, in 1934 the architect Luis Moya Blanco devised a new wing, annexed to the Palace, which extended almost to Calle del Río and with a new and monumental main facade facing Calle Bailén. None of this took place.

Finally, from 1941 to 1943 it was renovated to house the Museum of the Spanish People, it was then that the current façade facing Bailén Street was erected. The museum, however, was only open briefly from 1971 to 1973, when works in the neighboring National Council of the Movement (now the Senate) forced its transfer. Since 1975, the palace has housed the Centre for Political and Constitutional Studies.

During some works in 2019, buried remains of the basements of the demolished part of the palace appeared, in a magnificent state of conservation.
