= José María Salaverría =

Spanish author

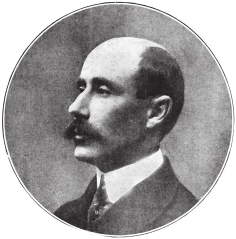
- Born: José María Salaverría e Ipenza; May 28, 1873; Vinaròs, Spanish Republic
- Died: March 28, 1940 (aged 66); Madrid, Spanish State
- Occupation: Writer & journalist
- Subject: Spanish literature
- Spouse: Amalia Galárraga
- Children: 2, including Margarita Salaverría Galárraga

José María Salaverría e Ipenza (1873–1940) was a Spanish journalist and writer.

== Biography ==
Born on Vinaròs (province of Castellón) on 28 May 1873, he moved early in his life with his family to San Sebastián.

In his capacity as a journalist he wrote in several newspapers such as ABC (1908–1940), La Vanguardia (1914–1936) El Pueblo Vasco (1920–1936) or La Nación (1914–1940).

His distinctive conservative agnosticism was a rara avis among the Spanish right wing ranks. Salaverría received influences from Charles Maurras; those were reflected in La afirmación española, where Salaverría advocated for a traditionalist and anti-Europeanist brand of nationalism. While sometimes included in the Generation of '98, this labelling is found to be questionable by many. He was a prominent basher of most noventayochistas, directing a campaign against the likes of Joaquín Costa, Miguel de Unamuno and Ramiro de Maeztu, only saving Azorín and Ángel Ganivet from his criticism.

He was married to feminist Amalia Galárraga, and they had two daughters, Carmen and Margarita. The latter was Spain's first woman diplomat, serving as a plenipotentiary minister.

He died on 28 March 1940 in Madrid.

== Bibliography ==
- González-Allende, Iker (2009). "From the self to the nation, willpower in José María Salaverría". Romance Notes. 49 (1). University of North Carolina: 61–69. ISSN 0035-7995.
- González Cuevas, Pedro Carlos (1990). "La recepción del pensamiento maurrasiano en España (1914-1930)". Espacio, tiempo y forma. Serie V, Historia contemporánea. 3. Madrid: Universidad Nacional de Educación a Distancia: 343–356. ISSN 1130-0124. Archived from the original on 23 June 2018.
- González Cuevas, Pedro Carlos (2006). "Ortega y Gasset ante las derechas españolas". Revista de Estudios Políticos (Nueva época) (133). Madrid: Centro de Estudios Políticos y Constitucionales: 59–116. ISSN 0048-7694.
- Navarra Ordoño, Andreu (2005). "Una geografía imperial: Vieja España, de José María Salaverría". Revista de Literatura. 67 (134). Madrid: Consejo Superior de Investigaciones Científicas: 463–482. doi:10.3989/revliteratura.2005.v67.i134.103. ISSN 0034-849X.
- Sánchez García, Raquel (2003). "José María Salaverría y la profesionalización del escritor". Revista de Literatura. 40 (129). Madrid: Consejo Superior de Investigaciones Científicas: 145–165. doi:10.3989/revliteratura.2003.v65.i129.167. ISSN 0034-849X.
