= The two Spains =

Phrase about the political division of Spain up to the Spanish Civil War

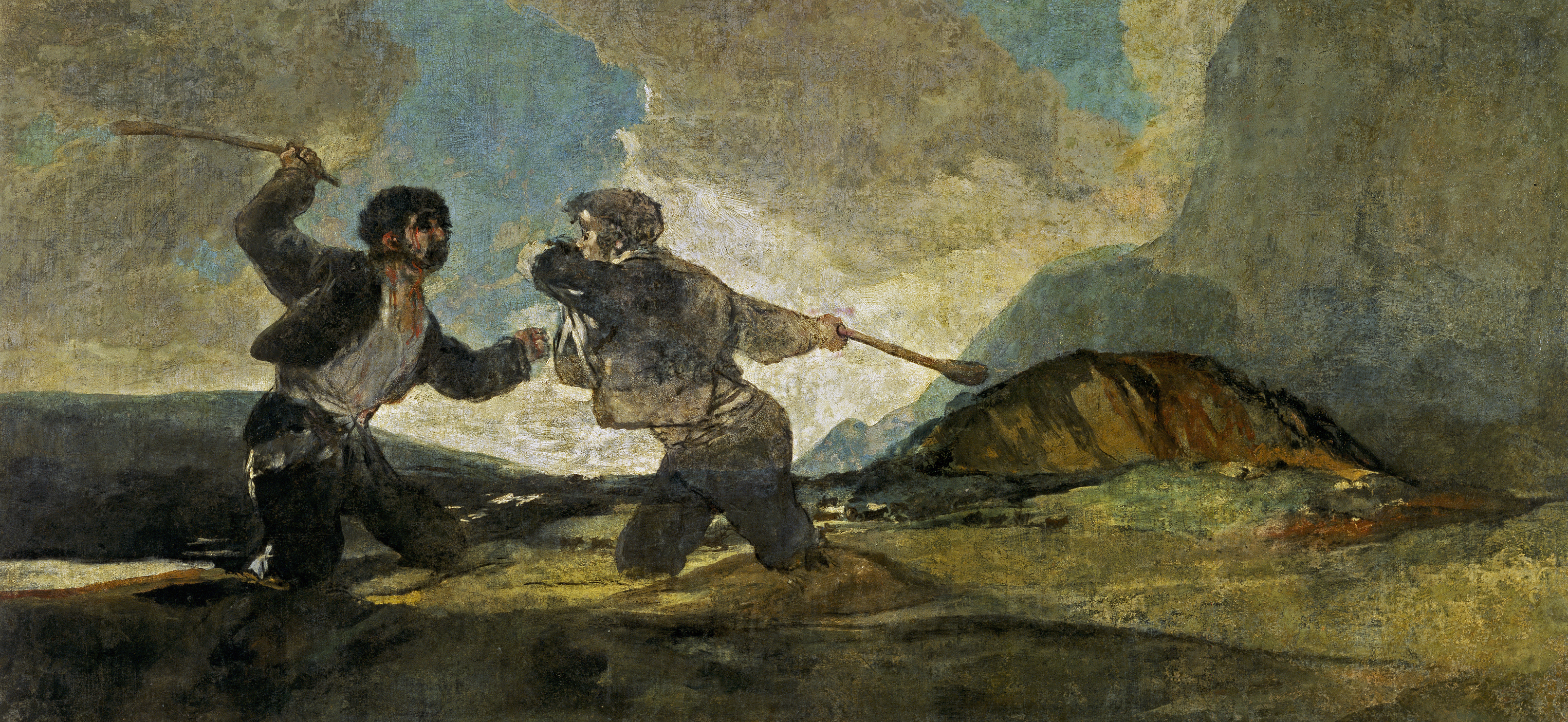
Francisco de Goya's black painting Fight with Cudgels can be seen as a premonition of the civil wars of Spain.

The two Spains (Spanish: las dos Españas) is a phrase from a short 1912 poem by Spanish poet Antonio Machado, used to describe the fundamental political cleavages that have divided Spanish nationalist thought since the Napoleonic Wars.

== History ==
The concept of a bitterly divided Spain in fact predates Machado's poem. Subjects to the Spanish crown in the 19th century divided primarily on three issues:

- the "social question", a class struggle engendered by burgeoning industrialization and urbanization;
- church and state separation vs. integralism; and
- whether the Spanish lands should develop a centralized "Spanish" identity inspired by Castilian mores, or develop more local regional identities (e.g. Catalan, Basque, etc.).

The disagreements resulted in the Carlist Wars, a series of civil wars that began 1833 and concluded with the Francoist regime a century later. In 1836, during the First Carlist War, journalist Mariano José de Larra wrote "Aquí yace media España, murió de la otra media" [here lies half of Spain, dead of the other half] shortly before his suicide.

As a historical model for the long 19th century, Machado/de Larra's two Spains is "far too simplistic". It retrojects 20th-century political poles, "one clerical, absolutist and reactionary, and the other secular, constitutional and progressive", into a time period when these political axes did not always align. It thus intermixes the centralizing enlightened absolutism of 18th-century Bourbon monarchs with a decentralizing "untrammeled enjoyment" of traditional aristocratic and clerical privileges. Nor were the populacho – the mass of the common people "pursuing a dimly perceived agenda of their own" – particularly loyal to any side of the debates in the long term.

Shortly before WWI, Machado wrote his famous poem, which is short and untitled, number LIII of his Proverbios y Cantares [Proverbs and Songs]. As the Generation of '98 sought to rejuvenate their nation, they initially believed that the debate circled around whether and how much Spain ought to Europeanize. However, the course of the 20th century, and especially social response to the Spanish Civil War, has made it clear that the axis of conflict lies instead on whether and how modern Spain is a nation state or a rump Spanish Empire. In the process of analyzing this phenomenon, they popularized Machado's phrasing.

== See also ==
- Corruption in Spain
- es:¡Vivan las cadenas!
