= Centre for Political and Constitutional Studies =

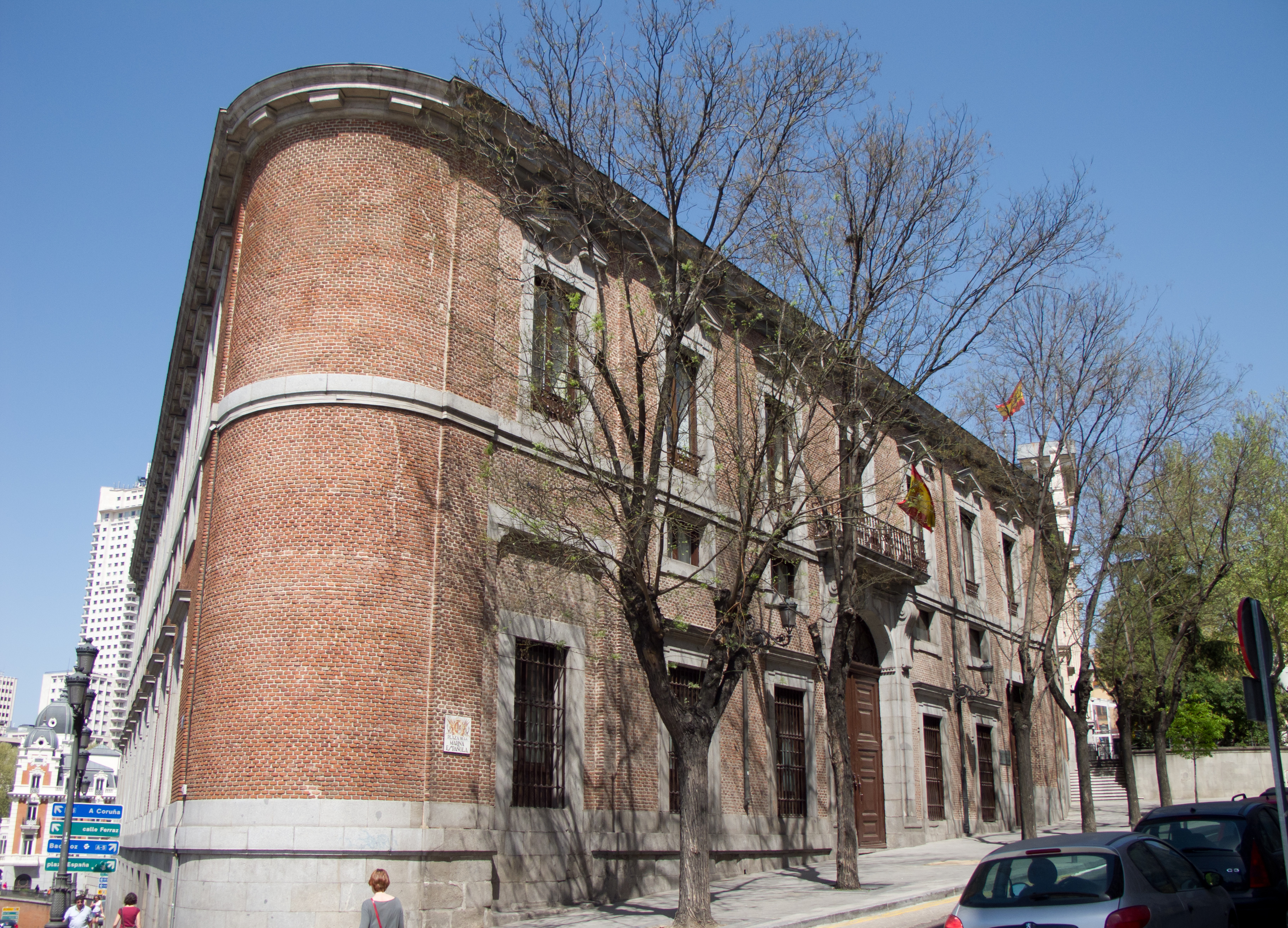
Palacio del Marqués de Grimaldi (also known as the "Palacio de Godoy"); headquarters of the CEPC

The Centre for Political and Constitutional Studies (Spanish: Centro de Estudios Políticos y Constitucionales, CEPC), previously known as the Institute for Political Studies (Spanish: Instituto de Estudios Políticos), is an autonomous agency associated with the Ministry for the Presidency of Spain.

Its mission is to analyze the international legal and sociopolitical situation, giving special attention to those issues that concern Spanish law institutions and how they relate to each other internationally and also in Europe. The organization is headquartered at the Palacio de Godoy, a historical building located at the Plaza Marina Española.

== Official Master in Constitutional Law ==
(Master Oficial en Derecho Constitucional)

At present, the CEPC with the Universidad Internacional Menéndez Pelayo, offers an official master adjusted to the high standards of (EEES), this postgraduate study has a great national and international reputation, with high academic qualities and high research orientation, supported by professors with great impact in the Spanish-speaking world, in addition, by the scientific production of its magazines, several indexed in Scopus and others notorious repositories.

This postgraduate degree, has its bases in the Diploma in Political and Constitutional Studies, a title that today has prestige in academic, legal and political for all Ibero-America. Many of its graduates currently occupy prominent positions in supreme constitutional courts, parliamentary assemblies, renowned universities and public administrations of the Ibero-American community (taken from: http://www.cepc.gob.es/master)

== Quality of the publishing house Centro de Estudios Políticos y Constitucionales ==
The editorial of the Center for Political and Constitutional Studies is among the 25 best publishers of scientific literature in Spain, according to studies carried out by the EC3 Group of the University of Granada, which produces the Publishers Scholar Metrics index (PSM) Of the CSIC Academic Book (ILIA), produced by the Scholarly Publishers Indicators (SPI). Both indexes measure the quality of Spanish publishers (Taken from: http://www.cepc.gob.es/publicaciones/libros

== Directors ==
Adolfo Suárez, Spain's first democratically elected Prime Minister, entrusted Fernando Prieto, a well-known political scientist, with transforming the old Instituto de Estudios Políticos into a center for political analysis, that would help Spain in its transition to democracy. Prieto became the CEPC's first director.

During the eighties and nineties, the CEPC was under the direction of professors Elías Díaz and Francisco Laporta, followed by the historian Carmen Iglesias. In May 2004, after the Socialist Party's electoral victory, José Álvarez Junco was appointed General Director. At that time, Junco held the chair of the "History of Ideas" in the faculty of "Political and Social Movements" at the Complutense University of Madrid.

On 19 May 2008, the position of General Director passed to Paloma Biglino Campos, Doctor of Political Science, Sociology and Law; a former Dean of the faculty of law at the University of Valladolid.

On 1 February 2012, the directorship went to Benigno Pendás García, a professor of Political Science at CEU San Pablo University and, since 1981, a lawyer for the Cortes.

== Academic journals ==
The CEPC publishes electronic versions of the following Spanish academic journals:

- Anuario Iberoamericano de Justicia Constitucional
- Derecho Privado y Constitución
- Revista de Administración Pública
- Revista de Derecho Comunitario Europeo
- Revista de Estudios Políticos
- Revista Española de Derecho Constitucional

They also maintain an electronic archive of the following journals:

- Revista de Instituciones Europeas
- Revista de Política Social
- Revista de Economía Política
- Cuaderno de Estudios Africanos
- Revista de Política Internacional
- Revista de Estudios Internacionales
- Revista del Centro de Estudios Constitucionales
