= Noticiero Granadino =

Spanish defunct newspaper

- Type: Newspaper
- Founded: 28 February 1904
- Ceased publication: 1936
- Language: Spanish
- Headquarters: Granada, Spain
- Circulation: Daily

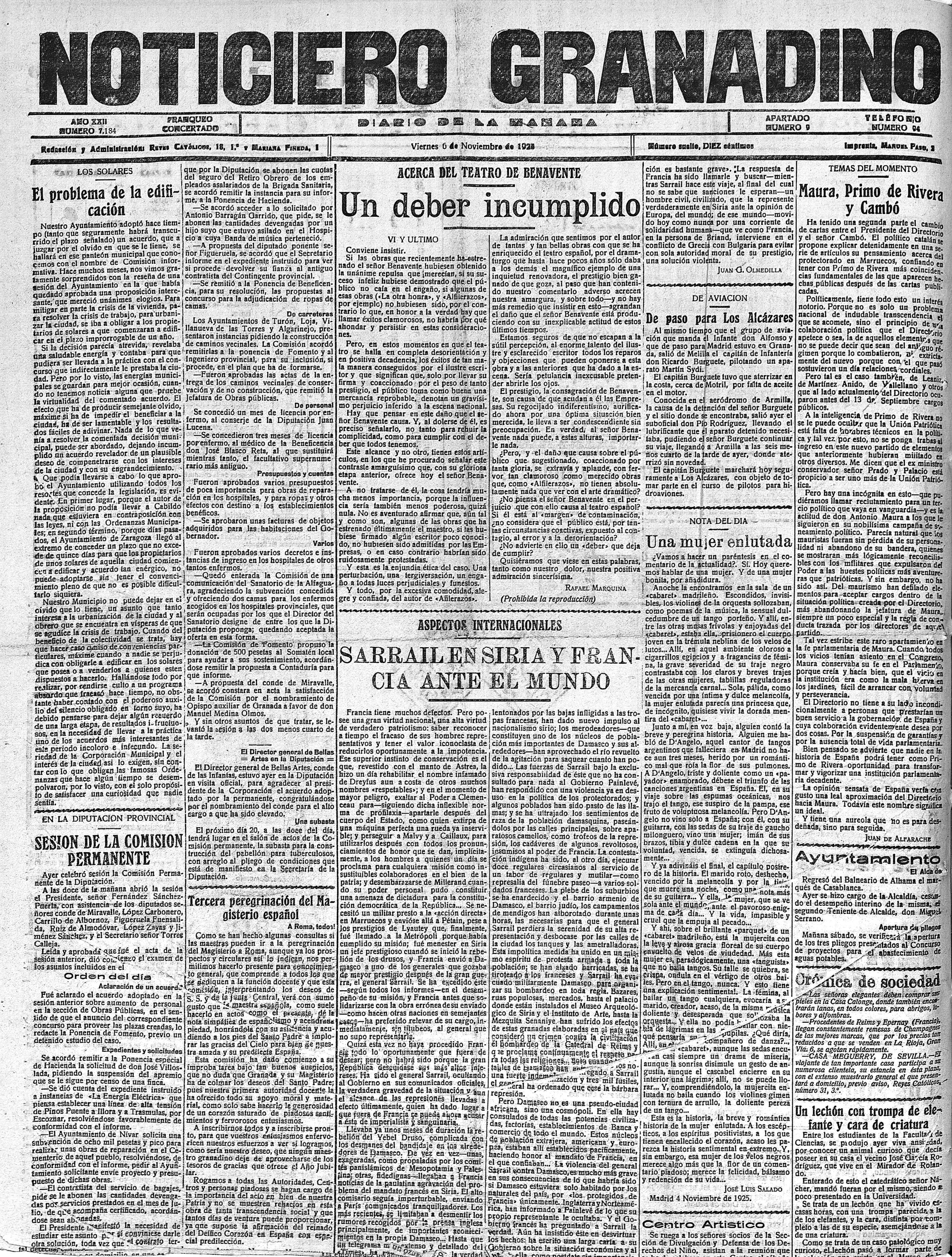

El Noticiero Granadino was a Spanish newspaper published in the city of Granada between 1904 and 1936.

== History ==
Initially created as a newspaper of liberal ideology, it was later placed in the orbit of the Conservative Party and configured as a newspaper of conservative ideology and sympathisers with the monarchy. There was a stage of its existence in which it was financed by local caciques, who used its pages as a means of expression. During the first third of the 20th century it was one of the main newspapers published in Granada, coexisting with other newspapers.

By 1927 it had a daily circulation of 10,000 copies, ranking behind El Defensor de Granada. However, from that moment the newspaper began its decline. During the riots of May 1931, the newspaper's editorial office was assaulted and burned. Despite its previous pro-monarchical editorial line, during the Second Republic period it took a turn in its editorial line and evolved into a journal of independent ideology.

The beginning of the Spanish Civil War in July 1936 led to the disappearance of the Noticiero Granadino.

== Bibliography ==
- Checa Godoy, Antonio (1989). Prensa y partidos políticos durante la II República (in Spanish). Universidad de Salamanca. ISBN 84-7481-521-5.
- Checa Godoy, Antonio (1991). Historia de la prensa andaluza (in Spanish). Fundación Blas Infante.
- Correa Ramón, Amelina (2000). Literatura en Granada, 1898-1998 (in Spanish). Diputación Provincial de Granada.
- Gay Armenteros, Juan C. (2001). Granada contemporánea. Breve historia (in Spanish). Comares.
- Morales Ruiz, Juan José (1992). La publicación de la ley de represión de la masonería en la prensa de la España de postguerra (1940). Institución Fernando Católico.
- Reig García, Ramón (2011). La comunicación en Andalucía: Historia, estructura y nuevas tecnologías (in Spanish). Sevilla: Centro de Estudios Andaluces. ISBN 978-84-939078-0-8.
- Ruiz Sánchez, José-Leonardo (2005). Catolicismo y comunicación en la historia contemporánea (in Spanish). Universidad de Sevilla.
