= Margarita Salaverría Galárraga =

Spanish diplomat (1911–2000)

- Born: 1911; Madrid, Spain
- Died: 7 December 2000 (aged 89); Madrid, Spain
- Education: Instituto-Escuela
- Occupation: Diplomat
- Spouse: Jaime Argüelles Armada
- Parents: José María Salaverría (father); Amalia Galárraga (mother)
- Awards: Order of Isabella the Catholic

Margarita Salaverría Galárraga (1911 – 7 December 2000) was Spain's first woman diplomat.

== Biography ==
Margarita Salaverría Galárraga was born in Madrid in 1911, the daughter of feminist Amalia Galárraga and writer José María Salaverría. She attended the Instituto-Escuela, then studied Law in Madrid. She was a study partner and friend of writer Emilio Garrigues Díaz-Cañabate.

In 1933, at age 22, she was among the approved appointees to the Second Republic's diplomatic corps, becoming the first woman to complete its exams. The same year, she went on to work at the Ministry of State.

Her name appeared on the list of candidates appointed third-class secretaries on 1 November 1933.

On 30 July 1936 a Diplomatic Cabinet was created, whose purpose was to advise the Junta de Defensa Nacional. This cabinet comprised three first-class secretaries (José María Bermejo Gómez, Antonio de la Cierva y Lewita, and Vicente Taberna Latasa), six second-class secretaries (Gerardo Gasset y Neyra, Luis Roca de Togores y Pérez del Pulgar, Rafael Romero Ferrer, Antonio Villacieros Benito, Fernando Sebastián de Erice y O'Shea, and Manuel Orbea Biardeu) and one third-class secretary, a position that fell to Margarita Salaverría Galarraga. The speed of these appointments may be indicative of the confidence of the rebellious forces in the chosen persons, who could be considered faithful to the rebel cause.

Salaverría Galárraga married fellow diplomat (and classmate) Jaime Argüelles Armada, one of the founders of Banesto. The couple had six children: Inés, Isabel, Jacobo, José, Margarita, and Pedro.

During World War II, she was posted in London, where her husband was a trade advisor to the Duke of Alba's team, and she worked as an embassy secretary.

In 1961, she was promoted to third-class plenipotentiary minister. It was an exceptional case for a woman to have worked as a diplomat from the beginning of Francoist Spain. In 1970 she was promoted to second-class plenipotentiary minister.

In the 1970s, together with her family, she moved to the United States, where her husband was the ambassador of Spain in Washington. Argüelles Armada died on 6 December 1995.

In 1981, Salaverría Galárraga was awarded the Banda de Dama of the Order of Isabella the Catholic by Royal Decree.

Salaverría Galárraga died in Madrid on 7 December 2000. Together with Aline Griffith and Meye Allende de Maier, she is considered to have been the muse of haute couture designer Balenciaga.
