= Belen Galarraga =

Bella Belen Galárraga
- Born: Bella Belen Galárraga Vargas; 26 January 1993 (age 33); Quito, Ecuador
- Occupation: Model
- Height: 1.71 m (5 ft 7 1/2 in)
- Beauty pageant titleholder
- Title: Miss European Continent 2016; Miss Maldives Islands 2018
- Hair color: Black
- Eye color: Green

Bella Galárraga (born 26 January 1993) is a Portuguese-Ecuadorian model, engineer, environmentalist, TV presenter and beauty pageant titleholder. She was crowned Miss Portugal 2010. On 22 January 2012 she won the Miss Elite Model Detroit/Ecuador pageant. She also is the first Miss Portugal to win the title of Miss European Continent 2016, held in Murcia, Spain.

== Biography ==
Born and raised in Quito, she is the daughter of a Portuguese mother and an Ecuadorian father with grandparents from “La Rioja” Argentina. Galárraga is a polyglot. She speaks Portuguese, and perfectly Spanish, English, and studies Russian. In 2009 she traveled to Portugal to continue her university studies; since February 2013, she has been a Systems Engineer and Marketing management, graduated from the ESPE University Escuela Politécnica del Ejército of Ecuador. She has been a professional model since she was 16 years old and has Portuguese nationality since 2005 and Maldivian nationality since 2015.

In May 2013 she made her debut as a television presenter in the program "Petrovida" The Ecuadorian state oil company Petroecuador a television program in favor of the environment, obtaining good criticism by the public. Galárraga was also a model of the famous program "The Familion Nestlé" and directed by the Venezuelan presenter Daniel Sarcos broadcast by GamaTV. In 2015, she was a reporter and presenter of sports television on a TV channel in Cuenca, Ecuador, reporting all about the Club Deportivo Cuenca of Ecuador.

== Reina de Quito 2012 ==
Galárraga has always been preferred by the press and public since she was a candidate and was nominated a finalist for the title of Queen of Quito 22 November 2012-2013..
