= Amalia Galárraga =

Spanish feminist

- Born: Amalia Galárraga Azcarrunz; 1884 or 1885; San Sebastián, Spain
- Died: 28 September 1971 (aged 86); Madrid, Spain
- Resting place: Polloe Cemetery
- Spouse: José María Salaverría
- Children: Margarita Salaverría Galárraga

Amalia Galárraga Azcarrunz (1884/1885 – 28 September 1971) was a Spanish feminist. She was one of the founders of the Lyceum Club Femenino of Madrid, and treasurer of its executive committee.

== Biography ==
There is very little published data about Amalia Galárraga's life, although it is known that she was a good friend of Carmen Baroja, which is why she helped, along with her sister-in-law Carmen Monné, to finance the Lyceum Club Femenino. Founded by 100 women from cultured social circles, and modeled on the Lyceum Club created by Constance Smedley in London, this was a forum for promoting the educational, cultural, and professional development of women. Galárraga served as the group's treasurer.

At the request of Ernesto Giménez Caballero, she wrote a chronicle dedicated to her husband, José María Salaverría. This was published by Giménez Caballero in La Gaceta Literaria No. 48 on 15 December 1928, with the title "Los escritores vistos por su mujer. José María Salaverría".

She left the Lyceum Club when moving to another residence.

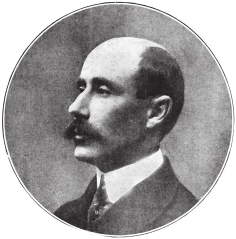
José María Salaverría

At the beginning of 1930, she participated in the founding of the Spanish Women's League for Peace, the result of the congress of associations for the League of Nations. This league was formed mainly by a group of pacifist women, most of whom, such as Galárraga, were also members of the Lyceum Club.

She was married to José María Salaverría, with whom she had two daughters, Carmen and Margarita. The latter was Spain's first woman diplomat, serving as a plenipotentiary minister.

After Salaverría's death, Amalia Galárraga lived in her hometown of San Sebastián. She died in Madrid on 28 September 1971 at the age of 86. She is buried along with her husband in Polloe Cemetery.
