= La Gaceta del Sur =

Newspaper of Granada (1908-1931)

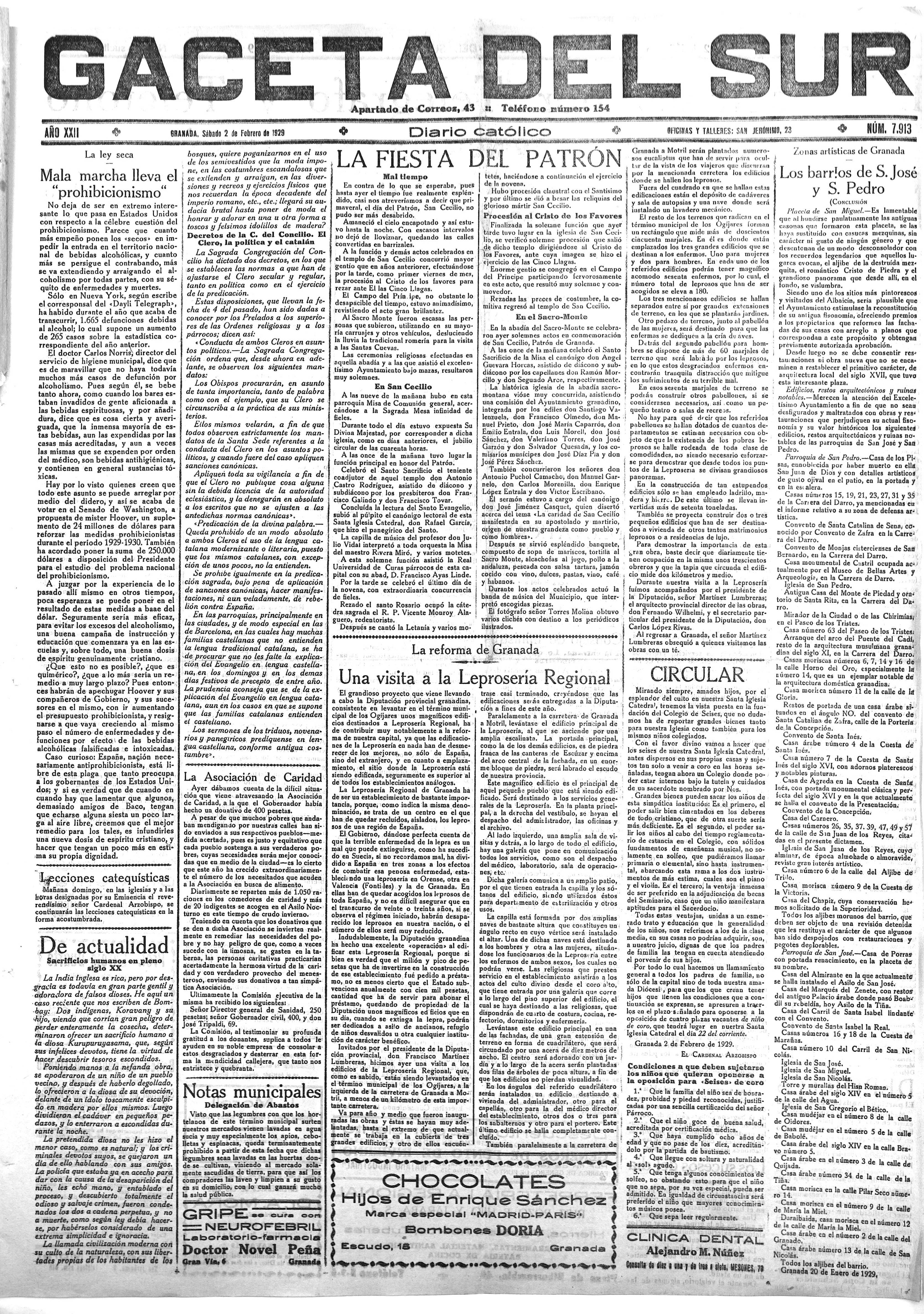
- Type: Daily newspaper
- Founded: 1908
- Language: Spanish
- Ceased publication: 1931
- City: Granada
- Country: Spain

La Gaceta del Sur (Gazette of the South) was a Spanish newspaper published in the city of Granada. between 1908 and 1931. (Note: Antonio Checa Godoy says the newspaper was founded in 1909.)

== History ==
The newspaper had a Catholic and fundamentalist ideology. It was founded in 1908. During the first third of the twentieth century it was one of the main newspapers published in Granada. At its peak, during the 1920s, it barely managed to surpass the 5,000 daily print run. It had a short period (1918–1919) in which, being under the influence of the priest Luis López-Dóriga, the newspaper had an editorial line of a Catholic-progressive nature. During the anticlerical riots of May 1931 the newspaper office went up in flames. After this, the newspaper stopped being published. The Catholic hierarchy tried to put it back into circulation, but the attempt failed and they decided to start a new newspaper, the Ideal.

== Sources ==
- Checa Godoy, Antonio (1989), Prensa y partidos políticos durante la II República (in Spanish), Universidad de Salamanca, ISBN 84-7481-521-5
- Checa Godoy, Antonio (1991), Historia de la prensa andaluza (in Spanish), Fundación Blas Infante
- Reig García, Ramón (2011), La comunicación en Andalucía: Historia, estructura y nuevas tecnologías (in Spanish), Seville: Centro de Estudios Andaluces, ISBN 978-84-939078-0-8
- Ruiz Sánchez, José-Leonardo (2005), Catolicismo y comunicación en la historia contemporánea (in Spanish), Universidad de Sevilla
