= José Álvarez Junco =

Spanish historian

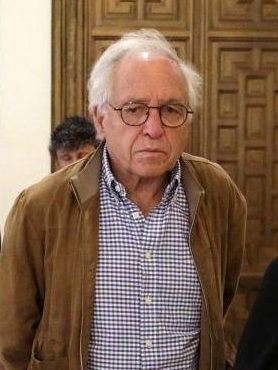
- Born: Vielha
- Alma mater: Central University of Madrid; Central University of Madrid; Complutense University of Madrid; Claudio Moyano High School
- Occupation: University teacher
- Employer: Centre for Political and Constitutional Studies; Complutense University of Madrid; Minda de Gunzburg Center for European Studies; Tufts University
- Awards: National Award of Essay (2002)

José Álvarez Junco (born 1942) is a Spanish historian, emeritus professor of the History of Thought and Political and Social Movements at the Complutense University of Madrid (UCM). He is an expert in the study of the nation-building of Spain, nationalisms and the anarchist movement.

== Biography ==
Born on 8 November 1942 in Vielha, in the Catalan Pyrenees, he moved young with his family to Villalpando (province of Zamora), where he was raised and spent his youth. He took his highschool studies at the Instituto Claudio Moyano, in the provincial capital, Zamora.

He studied law (1959–1964) and political science (1962–1965) at the University of Madrid. A pupil of Luis Díez del Corral and José Antonio Maravall during his university years, he earned a PhD at the UCM reading a thesis on the Spanish anarchist movement supervised by Maravall. (Note: He has commented it was intended that he would read the dissertation on 21 December 1973, but as Carrero was killed on that day, he asked for a delay, as it would not be a good day to read a thesis about anarchism.)

From 1992 to 2000, he held the Prince of Asturias endowed chair at Tufts University. He was also the Chair of the Iberian Study Group at the Harvard University's Minda de Gunzburg Center for European Studies (CES).

From 2004 to 2008 he was Director of the Centre for Political and Constitutional Studies (CEPC) in Madrid, serving in that capacity as member of the Council of State.

Chair of History of Thought and Political and Social Movements at the UCM, he retired in 2014.

== Works ==
Author

- — (1971). La Comuna en España. Siglo XXI.
- — (1976). La ideología política del anarquismo español, 1868-1910.
- — (1981). Los movimientos obreros en el Madrid del siglo XIX. Madrid: Ayuntamiento de Madrid.
- — (1983). Periodismo y política en el Madrid de fin de siglo: el primer lerrouxismo. Madrid: Ayuntamiento de Madrid.
- — (1990). El "Emperador del Paralelo". Alejandro Lerroux y la demagogia populista. Alianza Editorial.
- — (2001). Mater Dolorosa. La idea de España en el siglo XIX. Taurus Ediciones. (Note: Awarded with the National Essay Prize and the 2003 Fastenrath Prize.)
- — (2016). Dioses útiles. Naciones y nacionalismos. Madrid: Galaxia Gutenberg.
- — (2019). A las barricadas. Cultura, identidad y movilización política. Madrid: Ediciones Complutense.

Academic offices
Preceded by María del Carmen Iglesias Cano	Director of the Centre for Political and Constitutional Studies; 2004–2008	Succeeded by Paloma Biglino Campos
