= Gójar =

Coordinates: 37°06′N 3°36′W

- city
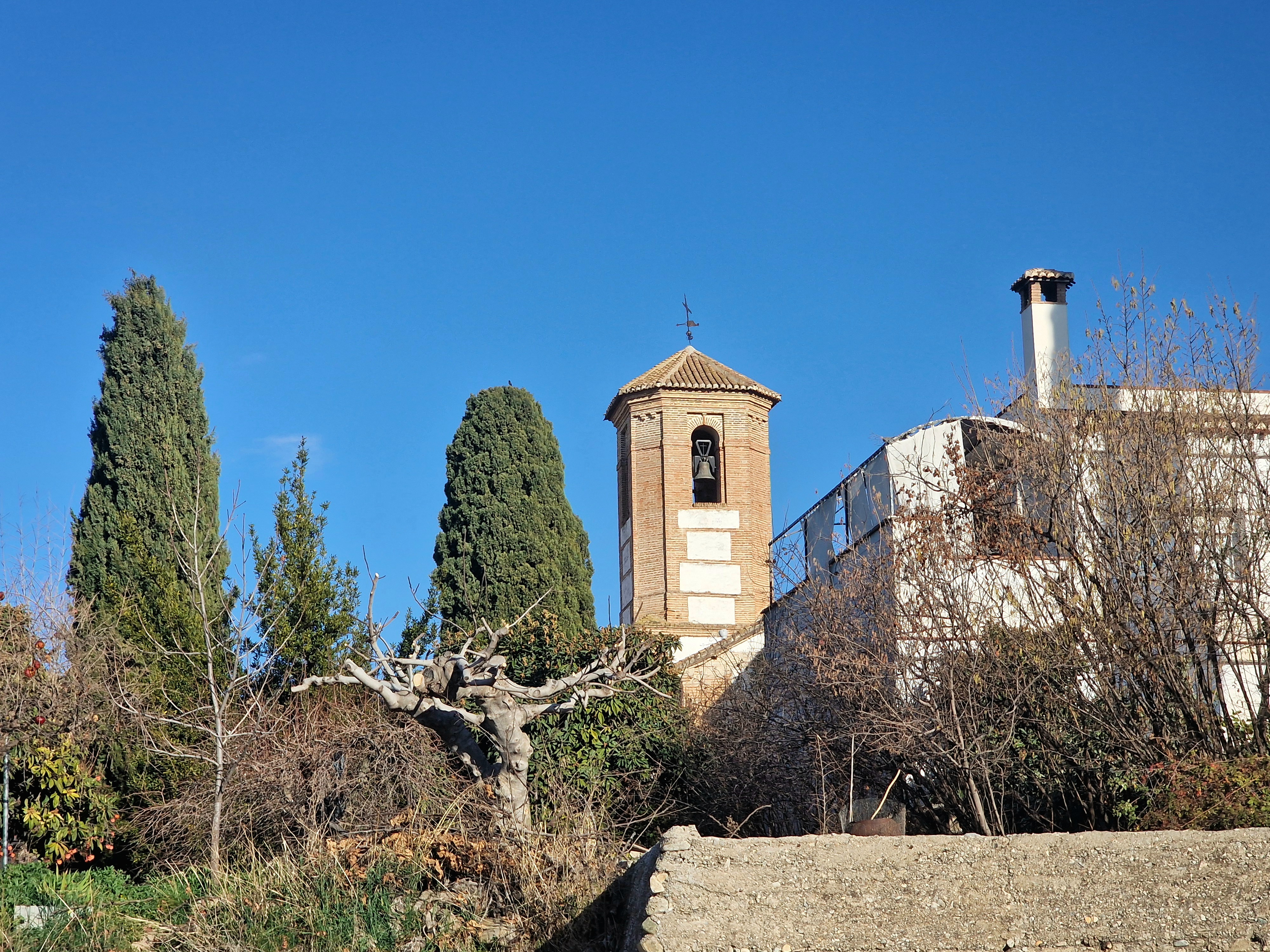

- Flag Coat of arms

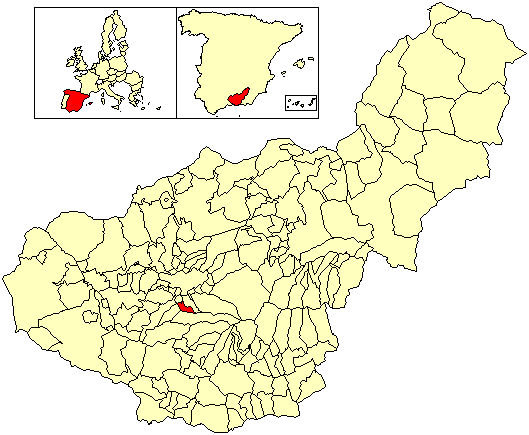
- Location of Gójar
- Country: Spain
- Province: Granada
- Municipality: Gójar

Area
  - Total: 12 km^{2} (4.6 sq mi)
- Elevation: 795 m (2,608 ft)

Population (2025-01-01)
  - Total: 6,371
  - Density: 530/km^{2} (1,400/sq mi)
- Time zone: UTC+1 (CET)
  - Summer (DST): UTC+2 (CEST)

Gójar is a municipality located in the province of Granada, Spain. According to the 2005 census (INE), the city has a population of 4,946 inhabitants.
