= Ángel Ganivet =

Spanish writer and diplomat

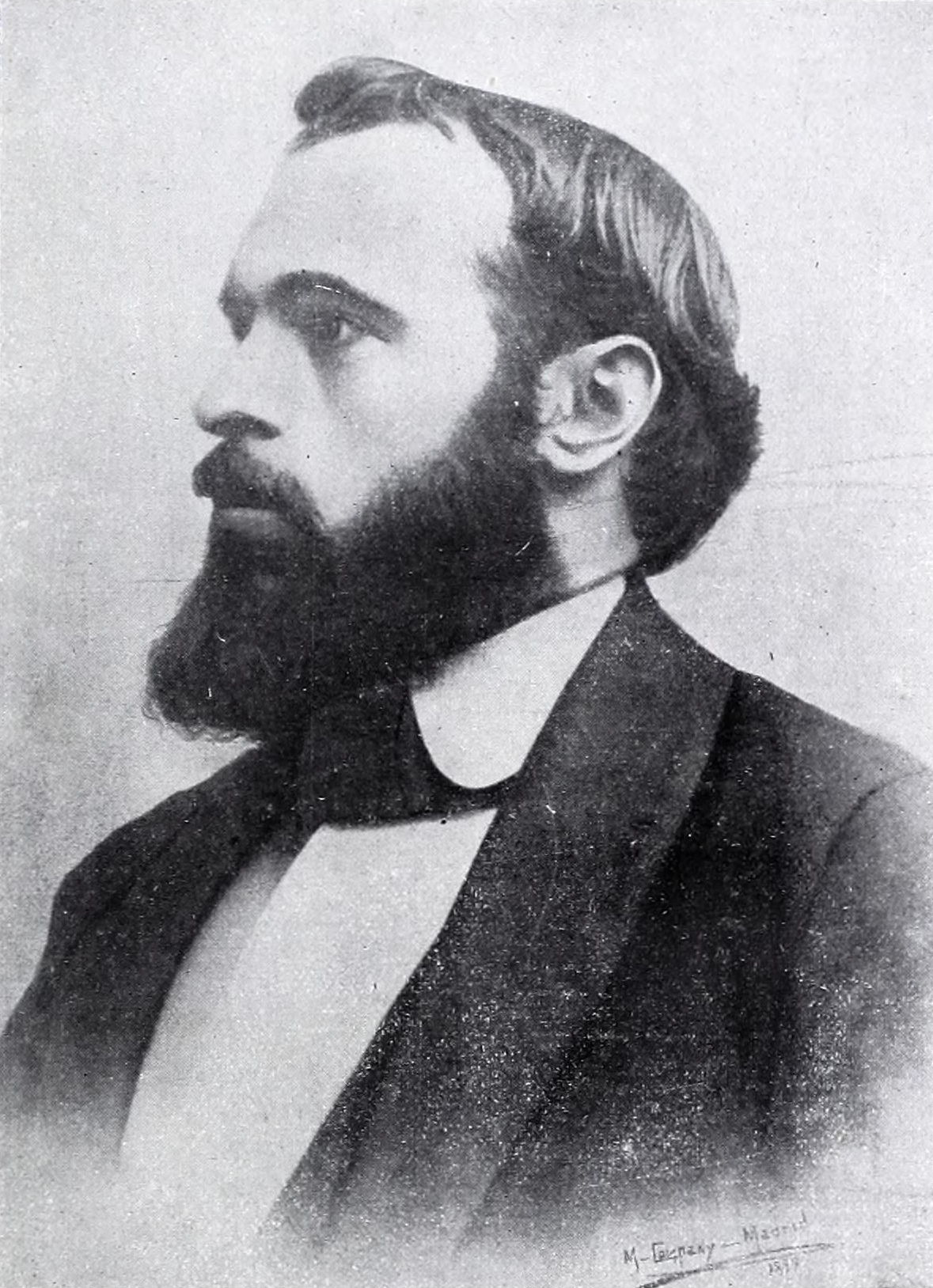
- Born: 13 December 1865; Granada, Spain
- Died: 29 November 1898 (aged 32); Riga, Russian Empire
- Occupations: writer and diplomat

Ángel Ganivet García (13 December 1865 – 29 November 1898) was a Spanish writer and diplomat. He was considered a precursor to the Generation of '98.

== Syphilitic paralysis and suicide ==
On 29 November 1898, disillusioned in love, Ganivet drowned himself in the Daugava River. Nearly failing in his attempt, he was first rescued but managed to throw himself into the river again. Ganivet had contemplated suicide for several years, and he had suffered from progressive syphilitic paralysis.

== Some of his works ==
- Granada la bella. (1896) (Granada the Beautiful)
- Idearium español. (1897) (literally, Spanish Idearium, also translated as Spain, an Interpretation)
- La conquista del reino de Maya, por el último conquistador español, Pío Cid (1897) (The Conquest of the Mayan Kingdom, by the Last Spanish Conqueror, Pío Cid)
- Cartas finlandesas. (1898) (Finnish Letters, also translated into Finnish as Suomalaiskirjeitä)
- El escultor de su alma. (1906) (The Sculptor of Your Soul)
