= Sociedad Económica de los Amigos del País de la Habana =

Learned society in Havana, Cuba

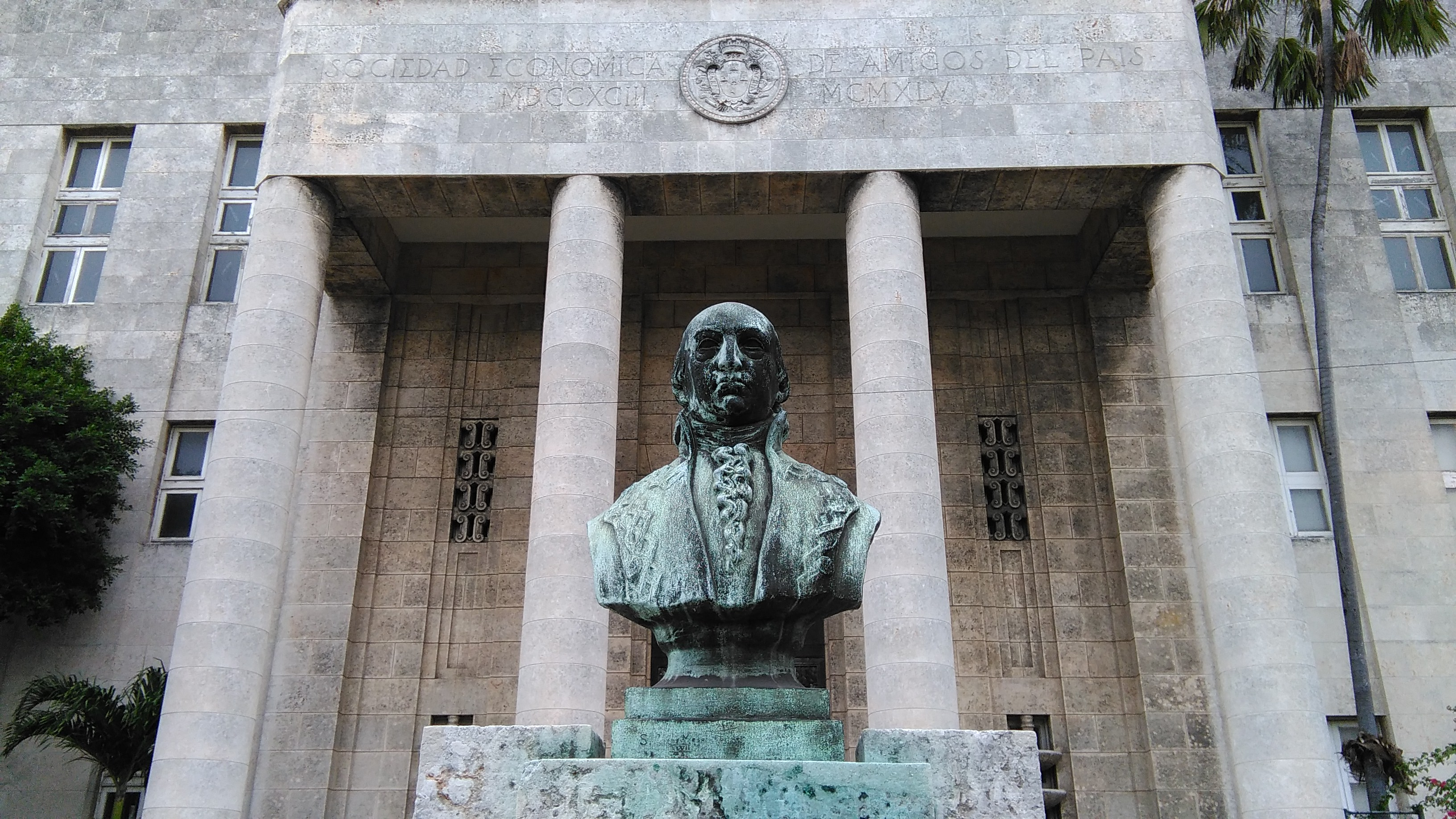
Headquarters of the Sociedad Económica, Havana (photo 2016)

The Sociedad Económica de los Amigos del País de la Habana or Real Sociedad Patriótica de la Habana (est. 1792 or 1793) is a learned society in Havana, Cuba. It was initially organized to promote agriculture, commerce, education, and industry, modelled on the Sociedad Económica de los Amigos del País in Spain. Founding members included Diego de la Barrera, Francisco Joseph Basabe, José Agustín Caballero, Luis de Las Casas, Juan Manuel O'Farrill, Tomás Romay y Luis Peñalver, and Antonio Robledo. In its early decades the group produced publications, maintained a library in the Convento de Santo Domingo (1800-1844), and arranged educational programs. Around the 1790s the group built the Hospicio o Casa de Beneficencia in Havana.

== Variant names ==
The society has renamed itself several times, as follows:

- Sociedad Patriótica de La Habana (1793-1795; 1838-1843)
- Real Sociedad Económica de La Habana (1817-1823; 1846-1849)
- Sociedad Económica de La Habana (1824-1825; 1843-1845)
- Real Sociedad Patriótica de La Habana (1835-1838)
- Reales Junta de Fomento y Sociedad Económica de La Habana (1849-1850)
- Real Junta de Fomento y Sociedad Económica de La Habana (1851-1853)
- Real Junta de Fomento y Real Sociedad Económica de La Habana (1853-1857)
- Real Junta de Fomento y Real Sociedad Económica (1858-1863)
- Real Sociedad Económica (1864-1866)
- Real Sociedad Económica de Amigos del País de La Habana (1877-1896)

== Bibliography ==
Issued by the society

- Memorias (in Spanish), 1793 – via HathiTrust 1793-
- El Papel Periódico de La Habana (in Spanish) 1790-1804. (fulltext issues via Biblioteca Nacional de España, Digital Newspaper Archive)
  - El Aviso (in Spanish) 1805-1809. (issues)
  - El Diario (in Spanish) 1810-1846

About the society

- "Real Sociedad Económica de Amigos del Pais de la Habana". Guia de forasteros de la siempre fiel Isla de Cuba [Guide for Strangers to Cuba] (in Spanish). Havana: Imprenta del Gobierno y Capitanía General por S.M. 1883. pp. 496–514.
- "Cuba: Sociedad Económica de los Amigos del País de la Habana". Handbook of Learned Societies and Institutions: America. USA: Carnegie Institution of Washington. 1908. hdl:2027/uc2.ark:/13960/t5t72q98c.
- Martínez Gutiérrez (1977), La Sociedad Económica de Amigos del País: su incidencia en la bibliotecología cubana (in Spanish), Universidad de La Habana (Thesis)
- La Literatura en el Papel periódico de la Habana, 1790-1805 (in Spanish), Editorial Letras Cubanas, 1990
- Juan Bosco Amores Carredano (1992), "La Sociedad Económica de La Habana y los Intentos de reforma universitaria en Cuba, 1793-1842" (PDF), Estudios de historia social y económica de América (in Spanish), no. 7, OCLC 13769013, archived from the original (PDF) on 2017-08-16 – via University of Alcalá
- Izaskun Alvarez Cuartero (1994). "Elementos renovadores en el crecimiento económico-social cubano: las Sociedades Patrióticas (1783-1832)". Boletín (in Spanish). 50 (1). Real Sociedad Bascongada de los Amigos del País. Archived from the original on 2016-10-05 – via Liburuklik: Basque Digital Library. (fulltext)
- Pedro M. Pruna (1994). "National Science in a Colonial Context: The Royal Academy of Sciences of Havana, 1861-1898". Isis. 85 (3): 412–426. doi:10.1086/356890. S2CID 143229761.
- Izaskun Alvarez Cuartero (2000), Memorias de la Ilustracion: las Sociedades Economicas de Amigos del Pais de Cuba (1783–1832) (in Spanish), Madrid: Real Sociedad Bascongada de Amigos del País
- Maria Merino and Carlos Fleitas (2000), "Trayectoria y ocaso de la Sociedad Economica de Amigos del Pais de Santiago de Cuba", Santiago (in Spanish), no. 90, Cuba: University of Santiago de Cuba, OCLC 62161906
