= Xavier María de Munibe e Idiáquez =

Basque writer (1729–1785)

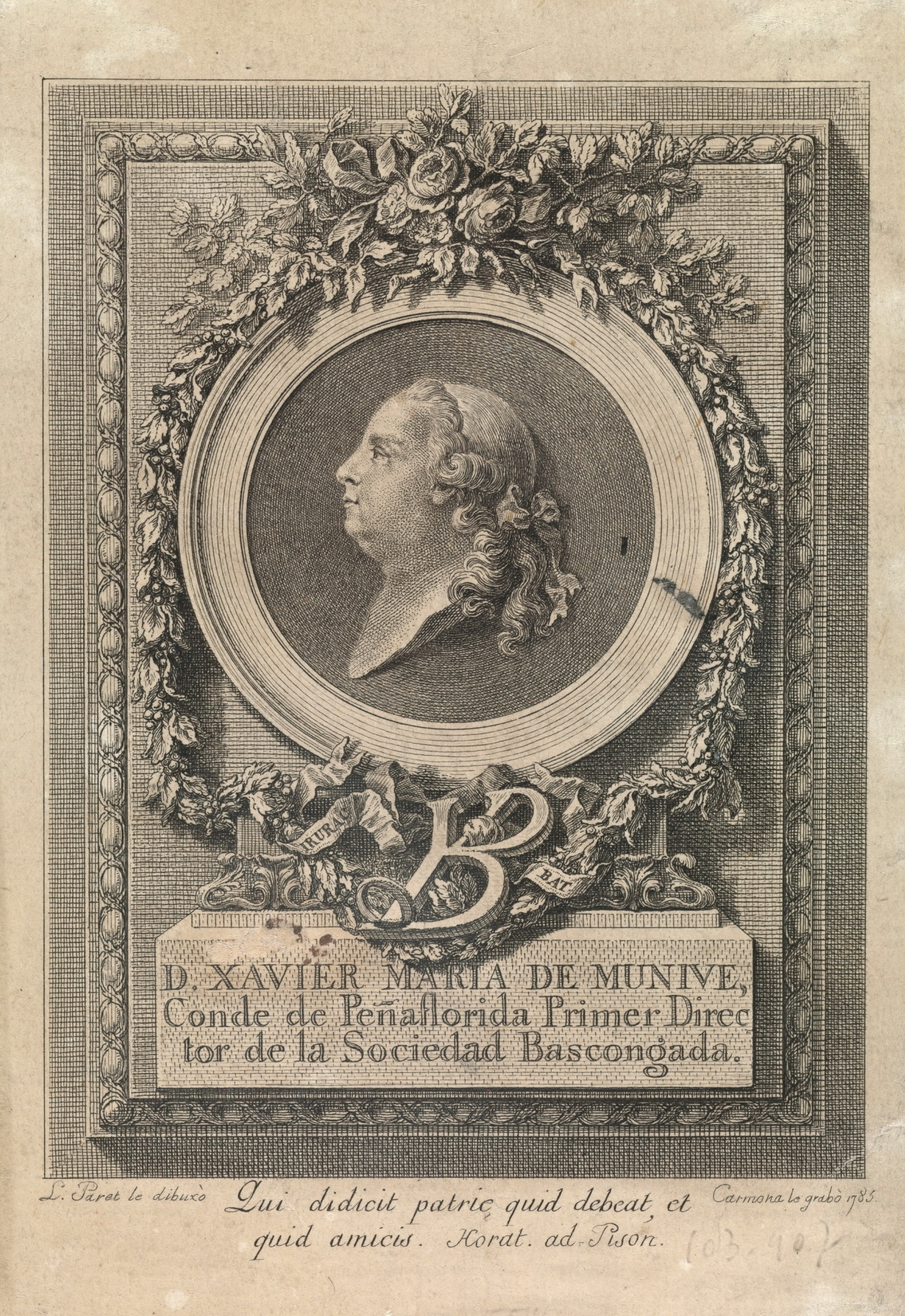
- Born: 23 October 1729; Azkoitia, Gipuzkoa, Spain
- Died: 13 January 1785 (aged 55); Bergara, Gipuzkoa, Spain
- Known for: Royal Basque Society of Friends of the Country
- Title: Count of Peñaflorida

Xavier María de Munibe e Idiáquez, Count of Peñaflorida (23 October 1729 — 13 January 1785) was a Spanish writer and intellectual, known for his leading work in Enlightenment Spain and Basque literature. He founded the Royal Basque Society of Friends of the Country in Bergara in 1748, which would become the first Sociedad Económica de los Amigos del País, a society inextricably linked to the Real Compañía Guipuzcoana de Caracas.

== Early life ==
Peñaflorida studied in Toulouse, where he established contacts with the Society of Jesus. He returned to Gipuzkoa—a semi-autonomous Basque territory—in 1746, settled in Azkoitia and became a senior official in the Regional Government (Diputación) in 1750.

== Enlightenment figure ==
Peñaflorida closely associated with two other men, the Marqués de Narros (José María de Eguía) and Manuel Ignacio Altuna. The three men came to be known as the "Gentlemen of Azkoitia" (los Caballeritos de Azcoitia) and the "Triumvirate of Azkoitia" (el Triunvirato de Azcoitia) and were responsible for promoting Enlightenment thought in Spain. In Peñaflorida's home, they founded an Enlightenment-style "academy" to discuss intellectual issues. For years the group maintained a regular program of discussing on mathematics on Mondays, physics on Tuesdays, history and literature on Wednesdays, geography on Fridays, and current events on Saturdays. It devoted Thursdays and Sundays to concerts, including works written by members of the "Gentlemen of Azkoitia" such as Fray José de Larrañaga. Out of these meetings evolved a more formal association, the Real Sociedad Bascongada de Amigos del País. Its incorporation charter and bylaws were presented to the government in 1763 and approved two years later. Peñaflorida, as its main proponent, was selected as its director for life. The three men also created in 1767 the Seminario de Vergara (Bergara). These two institutions proved to be key centers of Spanish Enlightenment thought and science.

== Works ==
Peñaflorida was the author of many works in his lifetime. They include Los aldeanos críticos (1758), Ensayo de la Sociedad Bascongada de amigos del país (1766), and Gabon-Sariac (1762) a religious epic dealing with the life of Louise de La Vallière (although some attribute this one to Manuel Larramendi). He also wrote the music and librettos of two bilingual (Spanish-Basque) comic operas, El borracho burlado (1764) and Comedia famosa.

=== Literature ===
- Los aldeanos críticos (1758)
- Ensayo de la Sociedad Bascongada de amigos del país (1766)
- Gabon-Sariac (1762)

=== Operas ===
- El borracho burlado (1764)
- Comedia famosa

== Sources ==
- Gran Enciclopedia Larousse. Barcelona, Planeta, 1988. ISBN 84-320-7370-9 (in Spanish)
- Historia de la REal Sociedad Bascongada de los Amigos del País at Real Sociedad Bascongada de los Amigos del País (in Spanish)
- Xavier María de Munibe e Idiaquez, Conde de Peñaflorida at Real Sociedad Bascongada de los Amigos del País (in Spanish)
- Libretto of El borracho burlado (in Spanish)

== See also ==
- Capilla Peñaflorida - early music ensemble established in 1985 as a tribute to the Count.
- Joan Tartas
