= Elhuyar =

Elhuyar is a surname. Notable people with the surname include:

- Fausto Elhuyar (1755–1833), Spanish chemist, and the joint discoverer of tungsten with his brother Juan José Elhuyar in 1783
- Juan José Elhuyar Lubize (1754–1796), Spanish chemist and mineralogist, who is best known for being first to isolate tungsten
