= José de Larrañaga =

Fray José de Larrañaga (1728–1806) was a Franciscan friar, organist, maestro de capilla of the Sanctuary of Arantzazu, composer, and was active in the Basque musical and cultural movement of the 18th century.

== Life ==
Larrañaga was born in Azkoitia (Spanish Azcoitia) in 1728, and entered the Franciscan order as a young man.

Although formal music in the Sanctuary of Arantzazu was still modelled on traditional Spanish models of Morales, Guerrero and Victoria, Larrañaga also had access to, and was influenced by the late Baroque Italianate style of Handel and Domenico Scarlatti. For example, the archive in Arantzazu contains two concertos by Handel copied in 1758.

Despite his monastic status, Larrañaga was closely linked to the birth of the Royal Basque Society of Friends of the Country, a movement bringing Enlightenment ideas in science and culture to the Basque country. Larrangada was therefore one of the 200 or more individuals in the Basque country who between 1789 and 1794 were investigated for their connections to Enlightenment movements abroad. Larrañaga was acquainted with Rousseau, possibly through his associate Manuel Ignacio Altuna y Portu, who had met Rousseau in Venice. Larrañaga also belonged to the circle of the Gentlemen of Azcoitia around Don Xavier María de Munibe e Idiáquez, count of Peñaflorida, who gathered at his home, the palace Insausti, in Azkoitia, Guipúzcoa, the composer's home town. He died in Arantzazu.

== Works ==
Partial list of edited works:

- various keyboard works.
- In omnibus requiem. Spiritual cantata for 5 voices with instruments.
- Missus est angelus (1785). Spiritual cantata for 5 voices with violins, trumpets and bass.
- Lamentation for the first day (1759), for 5 voices with violins, oboes, clarinets and muted horns.
- Prayer of Jeremiah - Oratorio Jeremías, for 5 voices with violins, oboes, horns and basso continuo.

== Selected recordings ==
- Fray José de Larrañaga Arantzazu XVIII - Sacred canatata In omnibus, Lamentations. Capilla Peñaflorida, Fabio Bonizzoni, NB musika. 2008
