= Sociedad Económica de los Amigos del País =

Private associations

The Sociedades Económicas de Amigos del País (Economic Societies of Friends of the Country) were private associations established in various cities throughout Enlightenment Spain, and to a lesser degree in some of Spain's overseas territories including the Philippines, Puerto Rico, Cuba, Guatemala, Chile, Venezuela, Mexico, and elsewhere.

== History ==
The Sociedades Económicas were founded as part of a movement to stimulate the economic and intellectual development of Spain. Many Spaniards recognized that Spain was lagging behind other European states and sought to diffuse and apply the principles of the Enlightenment. A principal promoter of the Societies' foundation was Pedro Rodríguez de Campomanes, a highly influential statesman and one of the most important thinkers in contemporary Spain. Campomanes, on a more practical level, saw that the Societies could stimulate improvements in agriculture, husbandry, industry, the professions and arts. The first one, the Basque Society of Friends of the Country, was founded in 1765 by the Marquis de Peñaflorida, Xavier María de Munibe e Idiáquez. According to Popescu, within a few years, the number of Economic Societies in Spain had passed 50, and they were present in all major population centers.

== In Spain ==
In Spain the organizations are credited with some success in sponsoring economic activity, stimulating new industries, and publicizing recent advances in philosophy and science (most of which emanated from England, France and Germany). These organizations were autonomous, although required to be licensed by royal authority, and their fortunes depended on a combination of the dedication of local members, official patronage, and the receptivity of the local community.

== In the Americas ==
In the American colonies, the Sociedades Económicas were established in Havana (1793), Santiago, Chile, Santa Cruz de Mompox (1784), Santa Fe de Bogotá (under the name of "Patriotic Society", 1801) Buenos Aires, Guatemala, Quito, Caracas etc. Dr. José Gualberto Padilla and together with Román Baldorioty de Castro, founded the Puerto Rican chapter of the Sociedad Económica de los Amigos del País and called it "La Sociedad de Amigos del País de Puerto Rico". Only one of these American groups, that of Guatemala, is known to have had any significant local influence at the time, and only one of them lasted for a long period of time (that of Havana exists today). Their mission of promoting local economic development, especially industry, conflicted with the dictates of mercantilism, which held that the colonies should remain dependent on the mother country. To the degree that intellectual development lagged in the New World, the Societies also had to fight an uphill battle to popularise Enlightenment thinking in the context of a very conservative culture.

Members were generally drawn from the local aristocracy, the university faculty if there was one in the city, professionals (e.g. lawyers), and skilled artisans. It is noteworthy that in the New World colonies, the later independence movements' first members were drawn from the same social categories.

Some of the groups in the Americas also strayed into activity that bordered on the political, and were punished by having their legal licenses revoked, which forced them to close, as happened repeatedly to the Society in Guatemala, for example. In some cities, the actual amount of useful work done was little, and they were rather more like faddish pet projects of a local intellectual and withered with the departure of the main personality who had gotten it started.

== In the Philippines ==
The Real Sociedad Económica de Amigos del País de Manila was founded in 1780.

Composed of leading men in business, industry and profession, the society was tasked to explore and exploit the islands' natural resources. The society led to the creation of Plan General Economico of Governor-General José Basco y Vargas, 1st Count of the Conquest of Batanes Islands, which implemented the monopolies on the areca nut, tobacco, spirited liquors and explosives.

It offered local and foreign scholarships, besides training grants in agriculture and established an academy of design. It was also credited to the carabao ban of 1782, the formation of the silversmiths and gold beaters guild and the construction of the first papermill in the Philippines in 1825.

The society was introduced in the Philippines in 1780, vanished temporarily in 1787-1819, 1820–1822 and 1822-1875 and ceased to exist at the end of the 1890s, when the United States took over as a colonial power.

== Legacy ==
In the larger view, the work of the New World Economic Societies was important for bringing Enlightenment ideas to the Spanish colonies, which was a necessary precondition for independence struggles after 1810. Some of the societies published essays on new developments in agriculture, industry, and other fields; they often advocated for relaxation of Imperial mercantilist economic regulation, with occasional (though short-lived) success. The Society in Santiago de Chile offered classes to the public in various trades, even venturing into teaching rhetoric, painting and drawing. Members of the Economic Societies defied local censorship to bring in copies of Diderot's Encyclopédie, the works of Voltaire, Locke, and others (books often available in Spain itself), and shared them amongst their friends.

In both Spain and the colonies, the Sociedades Económicas were incubators for modern forms of socialization, in which people (mostly men) gathered publicly to discuss the issues of the day. This represents a departure from the French Enlightenment's salon, which was a private gathering in someone's home. The Sociedades generally organized themselves formally, maintaining minutes of meetings, and having a set structure of officials to discharge various organizational duties.

== List of societies ==
=== In Spain ===
- Real Sociedad Caritativo Económica from villa de Alaejos, founded in 1785.
- Real Sociedad Económica Aragonesa de Amigos del País , founded in 1776.
- Real Sociedad Económica Extremeña de Amigos del País from Badajoz , founded in 1816.
- Societat Economica Barcelonesa D'Amics del Pais , founded in Barcelona in 1822.
- Real Sociedad Bascongada de Amigos del País , founded in 1765.
- Sociedad Económica de Amigos del País from Cádiz, founded in 1774.
- Real Sociedad Económica de Amigos del País from Gran Canaria , founded in 1776.
- Sociedad Económica de Amigos del País from Granada, asked its inception in 1775.
- Sociedad Económica de Amigos del País from Ciudad de Jaca y sus Montañas, founded in October 1783, seceded from the Aragon.
- Real Sociedad Económica de Amigos del País from Jaén , founded in 1786.
- Real Sociedad Económica de Amigos del País de Jerez de la Frontera (est. 1786)
- Sociedad Económica de Cosecheros del País from La Rioja, founded in 1783.
- Sociedad Económica de Amigos del País from Liébana , founded in 1839.
- Real Sociedad Económica Matritense de Amigos del País , founded in 1775 by Carlos III.
- Sociedad Económica de Amigos del País from Málaga.
- Sociedad de Amigos del País del Reino de Mallorca , founded in 1778.
- Sociedad Económica de Amigos del País from Medina Sidonia, founded in 1786.
- Real Sociedad Econòmica de Amigos del País from Navarra, founded in 1773.
- Sociedad Económica de Amigos del País from Oviedo.
- Sociedad Económica de Amigos del País from El Puerto de Santa María, founded in 1788.
- Sociedad Económica de Amigos del País from Puerto Real, founded in 1785.
- Sociedad Económica de Amigos del País from Sanlúcar de Barrameda, founded in 1780.
- Sociedad Económica de Amigos del País from Santiago de Compostela.
- Real Sociedad Económica de Amigos del País de la Provincia from Segovia , founded in 1780.
- Sociedad Económica Sevillana de Amigos del País, founded in 1775.
- Sociedad Económica de Amigos del País from Sigüenza.
- Real Sociedad Económica de Amigos del País from Tenerife , founded in La Laguna (Tenerife) in 1777.
- Sociedad Económica de Amigos del País from Teruel, asked its inception in 1803, but for lack of members it was not until 1834.
- Real Sociedad Tudelana de los Deseosos del Bien Público , founded in 1773.
- Real Sociedad Económica de Amigos del País from Valencia , founded in 1776.
- Sociedad Económica de Amigos del País from Valladolid, founded in 1783.
- Real Sociedad Económica de Amigos del País from Vera (Almería), founded in 1775.

=== Spanish Americas ===
- Sociedad Económica de Amigos del País from Santiago de Cuba founded in 1787
- Sociedad Económica de Amigos del País from Santa Fé (under the name of "Patriotic Society of Friends of the Country", (Bogotá) founded in 1801
- Sociedad Económica de Amigos del País from Colombia founded on October 19 - 1956 at Bogotá, Has some branch offices in others towns of Colombia.
- Sociedad Económica de Amigos del País from Cartagena de Indias (Reformed) in 1812
- Sociedad Económica de Amigos del País en Puerto Rico founded in 1813
- Sociedad Económica de Amigos del País from Santiago founded in 1813
- Sociedad Económica de Amigos del País from Mexico City founded in 1799
- Sociedad Económica de Amigos del País from Caracas founded in 1829
- Sociedad Económica de Amigos del País from Matanzas (Cuba) founded in 1830
- Sociedad Económica de Amigos del País from Panama City founded in 1834
- Real Sociedad de Amigos del País from Cartagena de Indias founded in 1790.
- Sociedad Económica de los Amigos del País de la Habana , founded in 1792 and currently active.
- Sociedad Económica de Amigos del País from Quito founded in 1792
- Real Sociedad Económica de Amantes de la Patria from Guatemala founded in 1795 and refounded in 1966
- Sociedad Económica de Amigos del País from Chiapas founded in 1819
- Sociedad Económica de Amigos del País from Lima founded in 1822
- Sociedad Económica de Amigos del País from Valencia founded in 1841
- Sociedad de Amigos del País from Pueblo de Los Ángeles founded in 1844, disbanded after a few months.
- Sociedad Económica de Amigos del País from Guayaquil founded in 1825
- Sociedad Económica de Amigos del País from Santa Cruz de Mompox founded in 1784
- Sociedad Económica de Amigos del País from Santa Marta founded in 1835
- Sociedad de Amantes del País|Sociedad Académica de Amantes del País from Lima, founded in 1790.

=== Spanish Philippines ===
- Real Sociedad Económica de Amigos del País from Manila founded in 1781

=== Elsewhere ===
- Economic Society of Friends from Dublin founded in 1762
- Wirtschaftliche Gesellschaft von Freunden from Bern founded in 1762

== See also ==
- Economic history of Spain

== Sources ==
Popescu, Oreste. Studies in the history of Latin American economic thought. London: Routledge, 1997.
Schafer, Robert J. The economic societies in the Spanish world, 1763-1821. Syracuse, N.Y.: Syracuse University Press, 1958.
