= Josefina Muriel =

Mexican historian and writer (1918–2008)

- Josefina Muriel de la Torre
- Born: February 2, 1918; Mexico City
- Died: January 30, 2008 (aged 89); Mexico City
- Education: National Autonomous University of Mexico
- Occupations: writer, historian, bibliophile
- Writing career
- Language: Spanish
- Period: 20th and 21st centuries
- Genre: History
- Notable awards: Order of Isabella the Catholic by the government of Spain, (1966)

Josefina Muriel de la Torre (February 2, 1918 in Mexico City – January 30, 2008) was a Mexican writer, historian, researcher, bibliophile, and academic. She specialized in the history of the feminine and religious world of the time of New Spain. She was awarded the Order of Isabella the Catholic by the government of Spain in 1966.

== Education ==
She obtained a master's degree and a doctorate from the Faculty of Philosophy and Letters of the National Autonomous University of Mexico (UNAM) in 1946. She was a student of Pablo Martínez del Río, Federico Gómez de Orozco, Antonio Caso, Ignacio Dávila Garibi, Rafael Heliodoro Valle, Rafael García Granados and Manuel Toussaint among others.

She was awarded a scholarship in 1947 and 1949 by the government of Spain, conducting studies and research at the General Archive of the Indies in Seville, as well as continuing her studies at the University of Seville in the field of Spanish Art History and at the University of Santander in the fields of Philosophy of History, Hispano-American Art and Castilian Literature.

== Distinctions ==
She was an Emeritus Researcher at the Institute of Historical Research of the UNAM and was interim director for three periods. She was a level III researcher of the Sistema Nacional de Investigadores (National System of Researchers). She was director of the Historical Archive of the Colegio de San Ignacio de Loyola Vizcaínas from 1976 to 1999. She joined the Academia Mexicana de la Historia as a full member in 1993, occupying seat 27. She was a member of the Hispano-American Academy of Sciences, Arts and Letters since 1993. She was named a full member of the Royal Basque Society of Friends of the Country in 1995. She was founder and member of the Mexican Society of Bibliophiles in 2007.

== Awards ==
- Order of Isabella the Catholic by the government of Spain in 1966.
- Emeritus Researcher at the National Autonomous University of Mexico in 1990.
- Medal for 45 years of academic services by the National Autonomous University of Mexico in 1996.
- Medal of Historical Merit – Captain Alonso de León by the Neolonese Society of History, Geography and Statistics in 1996.
- Lady of History Prize in 1998.
- United Mexico Foundation Award in 2002.
- Sor Juan Inés de la Cruz Award in 2003.

== Publications ==
She wrote almost twenty books, eighty book chapters, forty monographs, articles in Mexican magazines and in Spanish magazines. Her works include:

- Conventos de monjas en la Nueva España (1946). (Nuns' Convents in New Spain)
- Retratos de monjas (1952). (Portraits of nuns)
- La sociedad novohispana y sus colegios de niñas. I. Fundaciones del siglo XVI (1955). (The society of New Spain and its schools for girls. I. Foundations of the 16th century)
- La sociedad novohispana y sus colegios de niñas. II. Fundaciones de los siglos XVII, XVIII y XIX (2005). (The society of New Spain and its schools for girls. II. Foundations of the seventeenth, eighteenth and nineteenth centuries)
- Hospitales de la Nueva España (1956). (Hospitals of New Spain)
- Las indias caciques de Corpus Christi (1963). (The Indian chiefs of Corpus Christi)
- Los recogimientos de mujeres. Respuesta a una problemática social novohispana (1974). (The recollections of women. Response to a social problem in New Spain)
- Cultura femenina novohispana (1982). (Novohispanic feminine culture)
- Los vascos en México y su Colegio de las Vizcaínas (1987). (The Basques in Mexico and their Colegio de las Vizcainas)
- Las mujeres de Hispanoamérica en la época colonial (1992). (The women of Latin America in the colonial era)
- Crónica del Real Colegio de Santa Rosa de Viterbo (1996). (Chronicle of the Royal College of Santa Rosa de Viterbo)
- La música en las Instituciones Femeninas Novohispanas (2009). (Music in the Novohispanic Women's Institutions)

== Bibliography ==
- National Autonomous University of Mexico; Perez San Vicente, Guadalupe (1992). "Josefina Muriel de la Torre". General Directorate of Academic Personnel Affairs, ed. Our teachers. Mexico: National Autonomous University of Mexico. pp. 225–227. ISBN 968-36-2299-2. Retrieved December 14, 2009.
