= Count of Echauz =

Spanish hereditary peerage title

County of Echauz
- Creation date: 1784
- Created by: Charles III of Spain
- Peerage: Grandee of Spain
- First holder: José Manuel de Acedo y Jiménez de Loyola
- Present holder: Alfonso Cervantes Sánchez-Navarro
- Seats: Château d'Etchaux; Palacio de Montehermoso; Palacio de Ezpeleta

Count of Echauz is a Spanish hereditary peerage title which was created by King Charles III of Spain and Naples in 1784 and bestowed upon José Manuel de Acedo y Jiménez de Loyola, heir of the Majorat of Loyola, Acedo and Lord of Riocavado.

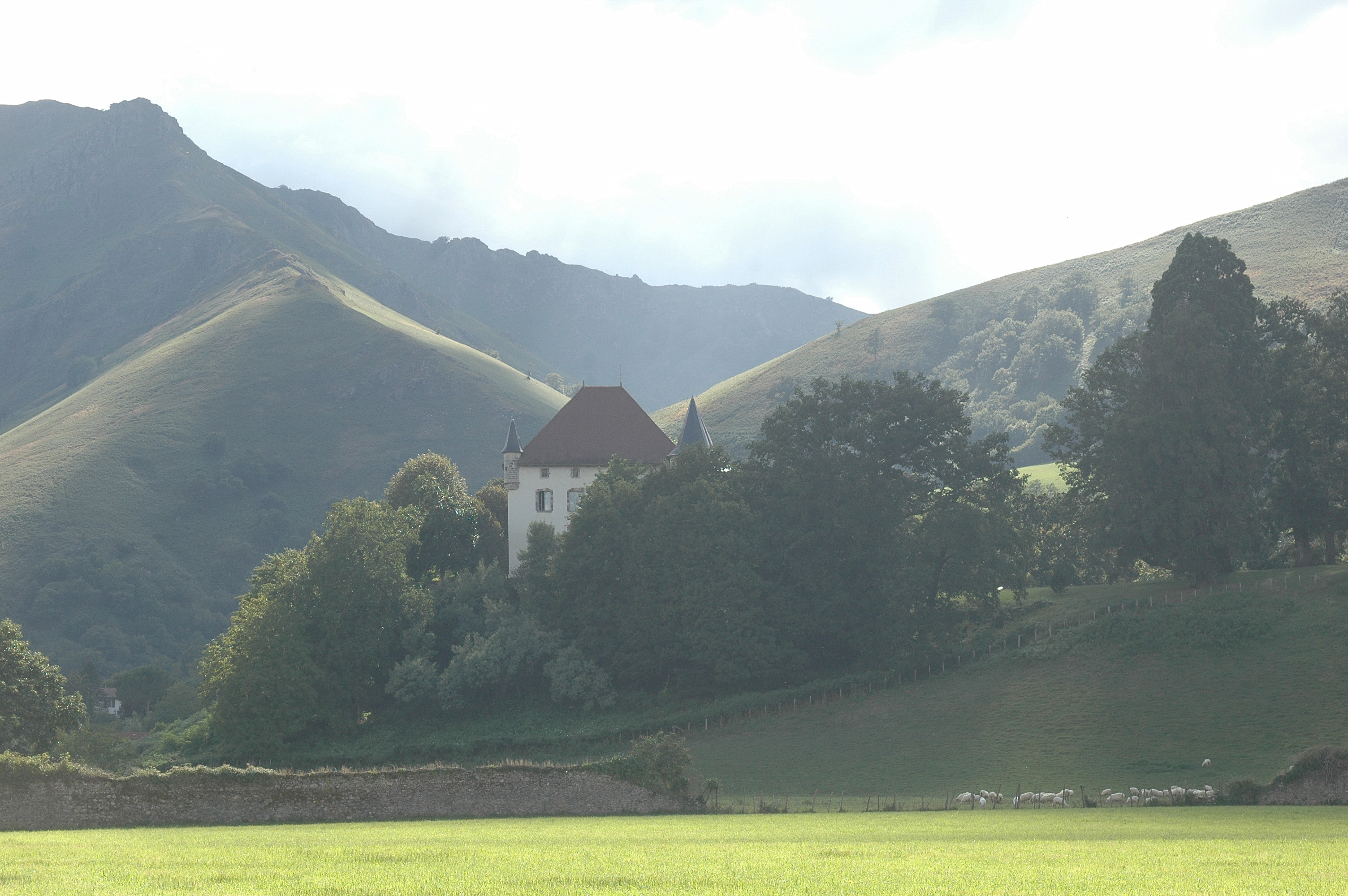
Echauz Castle, Château d'Etchaux, built in the 16th century by the Counts of Echauz

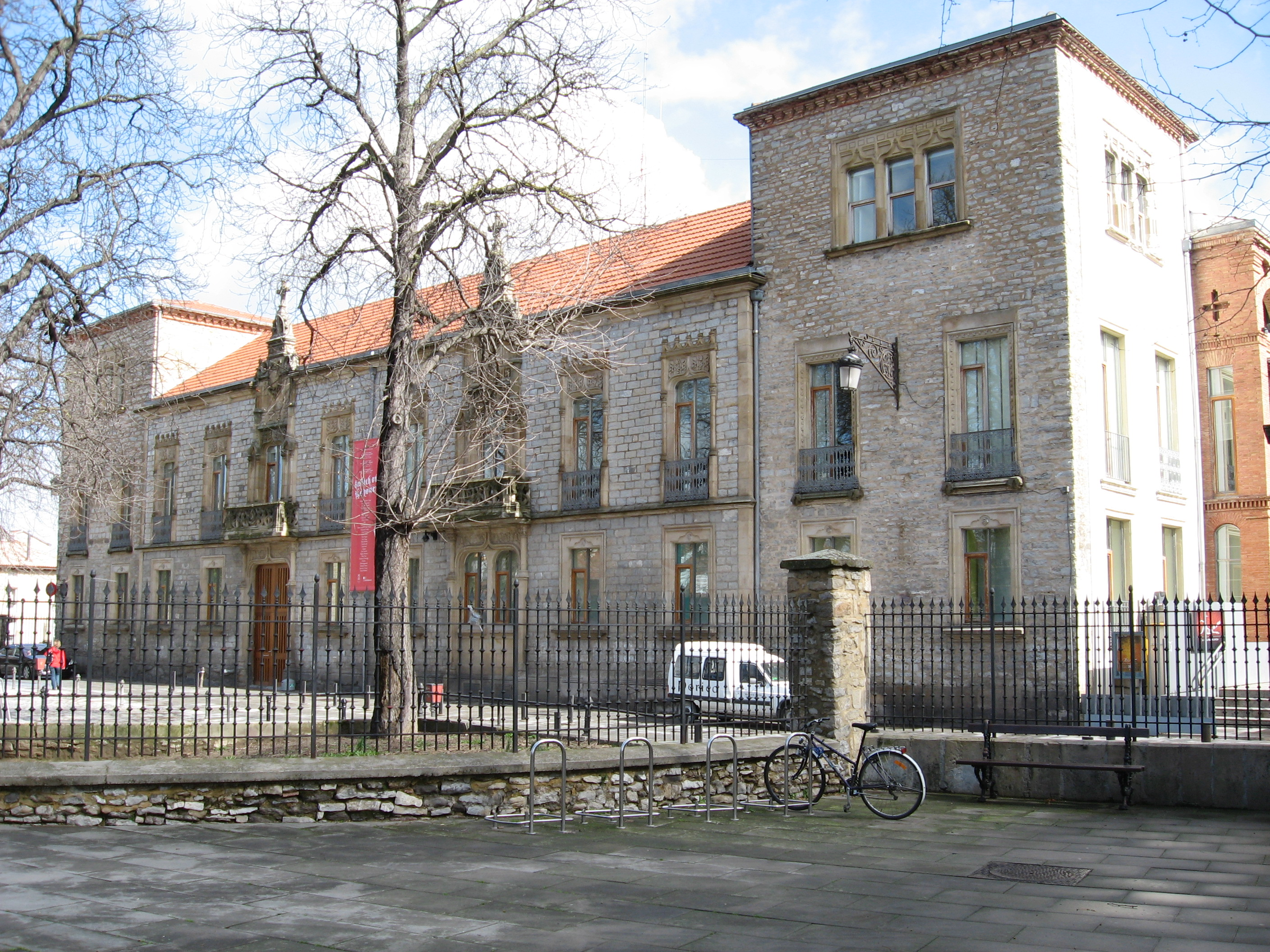
Palace of Montehermoso, built in the 16th century Renaissance Palace, seat of the 3rd countess of Echauz

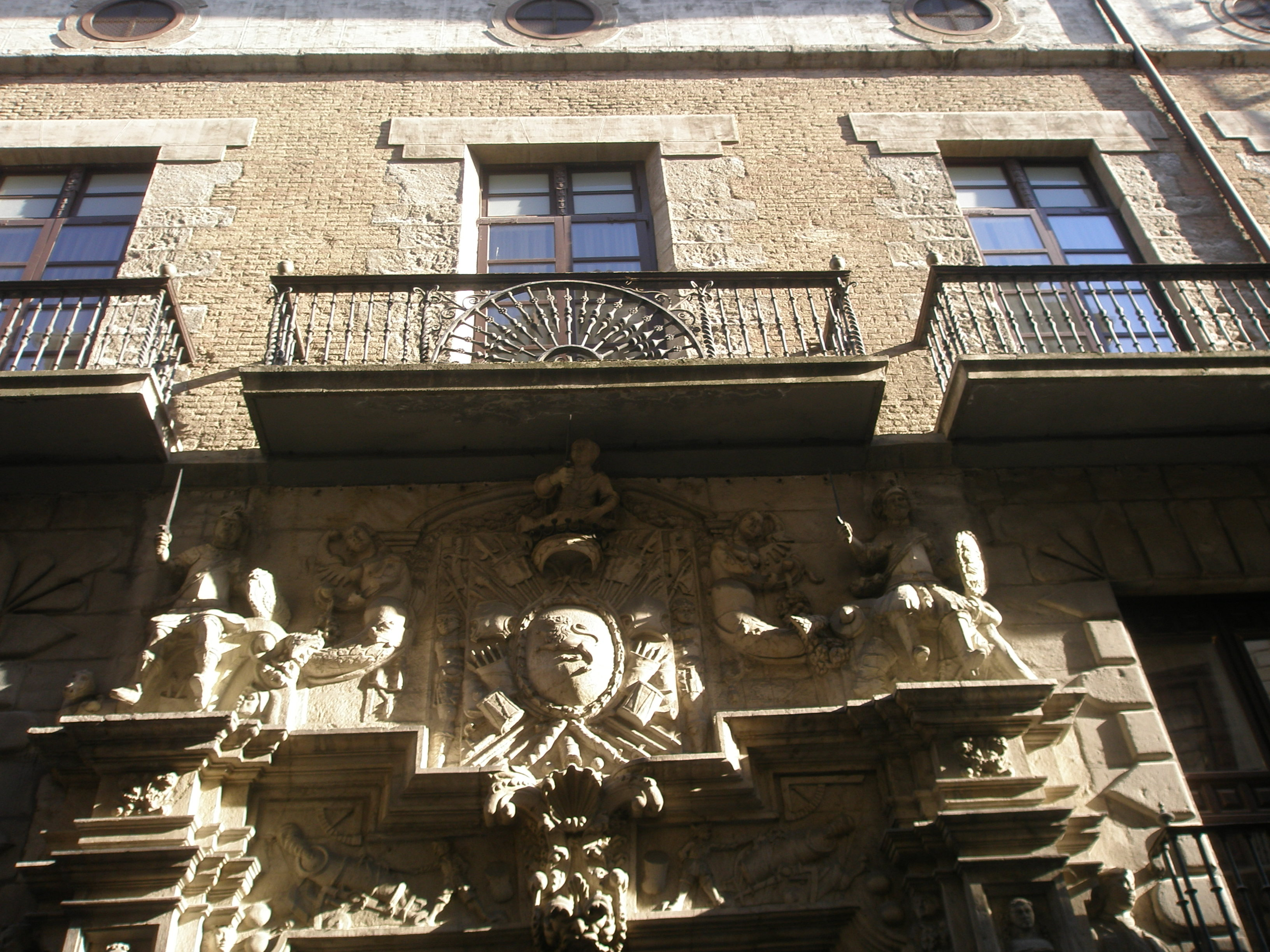
Palace of Ezpeleta, built in the 18th century, seat of the 5th count of Echauz

== History ==
The Counts of Echauz are a branch of the Viscounts of Baigorri. The title was granted around 1033, in the High Middle Ages, by King Sancho III of Pamplona.

The name of the peerage refers to Echauz Castle, in the province of Saint-Étienne-de-Baïgorry, Lower Navarre, which was part of the Kingdom of Navarre, alongside the Bay of Biscay between present-day Spain and France.

== Counts of Echauz ==
Created by Charles III of Spain
	Name	Period	Other titles	Notes
I	José Manuel de Acedo y Jiménez de Loyola (1726–1786)	1784–1786	Heir of the Majorat Loyola and Acedo; Lord of Riocavado	
II	José María de Acedo y Atodo (b. 1758)	1788–1809		Son of the preceding
III	María del Pilar Acedo y Sarriá (1784–1867)	1809–1867	5th countess of Vado	Daughter of the preceding
IV	María Amalia del Pilar de Aguirre-Zuazo y Acedo (1801–1876)	1867–1876	3rd duchess of Castro-Terreño; 12th countess of Triviana; 6th countess of Vado	Daughter of the preceding
V	José María Ortuño de Ezpeleta y Samarniego (1846–1919)	1876–1919	4th duke of Castro-Terreño; 4th count of Ezpeleta; 13th count of Triviana	Grandson of the preceding
VI	María de Ezpeleta y Álvarez de Toledo (1872–1949)	1919–1949	5th duchess of Castro-Terreño; 5th countess of Ezpelta; 14th countess of Triviana; 23rd countess of Adernò	Daughter of the preceding
VII	Fernando de Villar-Villamil y Ezpeleta (1899-1984)	1949–1984	6th duke of Castro-Terreño; 6th count of Ezpelta; 15th count of Triviana; 24th count of Adernò	Son of the preceding
VIII	Blanca de Villar-Villamil y Ezpeleta (1913-1993)	1984–1993	7th duchess of Castro-Terreño; 7th countess of Ezpelta; 16th countess of Triviana; 25th countess of Adernò	Sister of the preceding
IX	Carlos Sánchez-Navarro de Villar-Villamil (b. 1947)	1993–2010	8th duke of Castro-Terreño; 8th count of Ezpelta; 17th count of Triviana	Son of the preceding
X	Alfonso Cervantes Sánchez-Navarro (b. 1962)	since 2010		

== Family tree ==
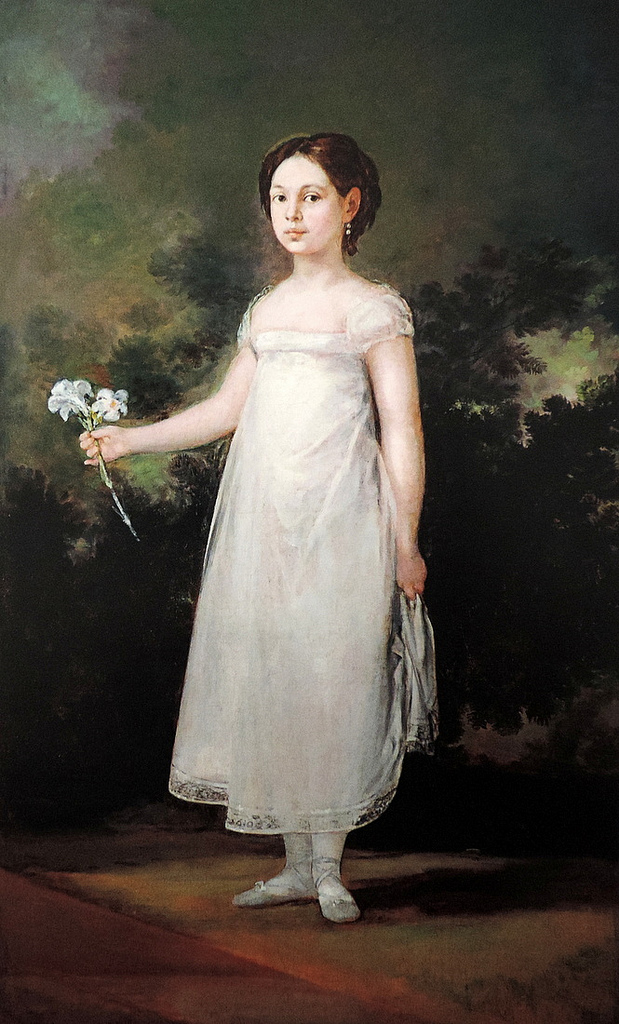
María Amalia de Aguirre-Zuazo y Acedo, 4th countess de Echauz.

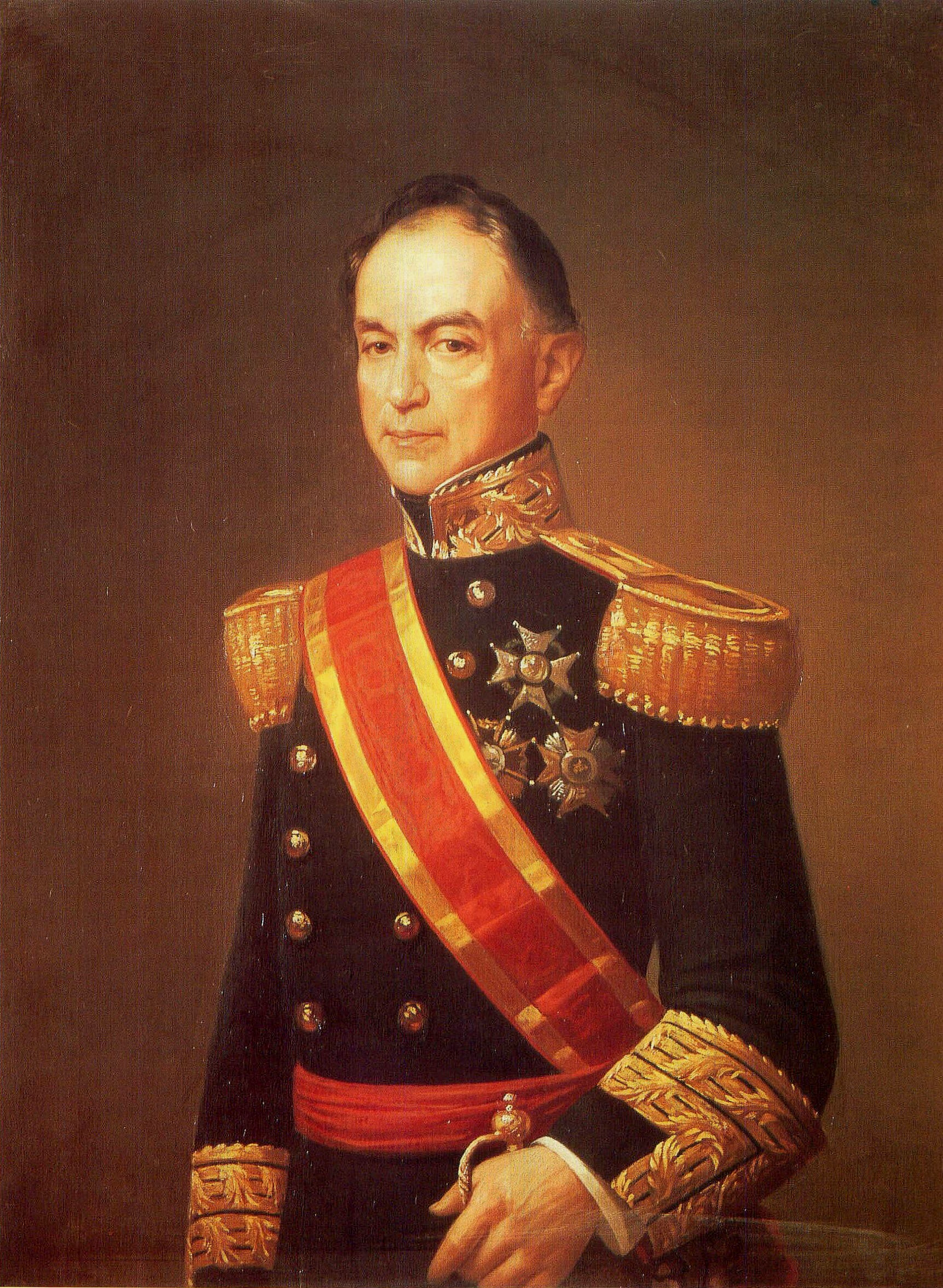
Count of Echauz

José Manuel de Acedo y Jiménez de Loyola, 1st count of Echauz; Heir of Acedo, de Loyola and Lord of Rivocado (1784-1786)
José María de Acedo y Atodo, 2nd count of Echauz (1788-1809)
María del Pilar de Acedo y Sarria, 3rd countess of Echauz; 5th countess of Vado (1809-1867)
María Amalia del Pilar de Aguirre-Zuazo y de Acedo, 4th countess of Echauz; 3rd duchess of Castro-Terrreño; 12th countess of Triviana; 6th countess of Vado (1867-1876)
María del Pilar Ezpeleta y Aguirre-Zuazo, 7th countess del Vado countess of Guenduláin (1876-1902)	José María Ortuno de Ezpeleta y Aguirre-Zuazo, 3rd count of Ezpeleta de Veire (1818-1885)
José María Ortuño de Ezpeleta y Samarniego, 5th count of Echauz; 4th duchess of Castro-Terreño; 4th countess of Ezpeleta de Veire; 13th count of Triviana (1876-1919)
María de Ezpeleta y Álvarez de Toledo, 6th countess of Echauz; 5th duchess of Castro-Terrreño; 5th countess of Ezpeleta de Veire; 14th countess of Triviana; 23rd countess of Adernò (1919-1949)
Fernando de Villar-Villamil y Ezpeleta, 7th count of Echauz; 6th duke of Castro-Terreño; 6th count of Ezpeleta de Veire; 15th count of Triviana; 24th count of Adernò (1949-1984)	Blanca de Villar-Villamil y Ezpeleta, 8th countess of Echauz; 7th duchess of Castro-Terrreño; 7th countess of Ezpeleta de Veire; 16th countess of Triviana; 25th countess of Adernò (1984-1993)
Blanca Sánchez-Navarro y Villar-Villamil,	Carlos Sánchez-Navarro y Villar-Villamil, 9th count of Echauz; 8th duke of Castro-Terrreño; 8th count of Ezpeleta de Veire (1993-2010)
Alfonso Cervantes Sánchez-Navarro, 10th count of Echauz (2010-)
