= Capilla Peñaflorida =

The Capilla Peñaflorida is a Spanish early music group founded in 1985 by Jon Bagüés.

The first director was the late José Rada Sereno (1947–2001). Currently musical direction is shared by the founder, the Basque musicologist Jon Bagüés (b. Errenteria, 1955), and by the bass Josep Cabré. The ensemble has also been directed by guest conductors including the French cellist Christophe Coin and Italian harpsichordist Fabio Bonizzoni.

The name is a tribute to the work of Don Xavier María de Munibe e Idiáquez, count of Peñaflorida, (Azcoitia, 1723-Vergara, 1785) although the original count did not himself have a capilla, but was responsible instead for promoting musical education and arts in the Basque Country.

== Discography ==
- 1991 - Juan García de Salazar (1639-1710). Elkar 260.
- 1993 - José Rada In Memoriam. Elkar KD-342.
- 1996 - José de Nebra: Viento es la dicha de Amor. Capilla Peñaflorida with the Ensemble Baroque de Limoges. Christophe Coin. Audivis Valois 4752
- 1996 - Juan Vásquez: Agenda Defunctorum. Almaviva 0122.
- 1997 - Vísperas de Santa María. 14th Centenary of the Roman Catholic Diocese of Osma-Soria. Valladolid GAM 9710025.
- 1998 - Francisco Guerrero: Missa "Puer natus est" - Canciones y Villanescas Espirituales. Almaviva 0126.
- 1999 - Salve Reyna: Música Española. by Juan Hidalgo de Polanco, Joan Cererols, Antonio Martín y Coll, Carlos Patiño, Juan García de Salazar. Glissando 777 005–2.
- 2004 - Juan de Anchieta: Missa Sine Nomine. Salve Regina. with the Ministriles de Marsías. recorded 2000. Naxos 8.555772.
- 2004 - Juan García de Salazar: Officium Et Missa Pro Defunctis. dir.Cabré K617162.
- 2005 - Juan de Anchieta: Missa Rex Virginum - Motecta. dir.Cabré K617178.
- 2006 - Juan García de Salazar: Complete Vespers of Our Lady. with Ministriles de Marsías. Naxos 8.555907.
- 2007 - Fray José de Larrañaga (1728-1806): Obras religiosas. dir. Fabio Bonizzoni. NB Musika005.
- 2008 - Urbán de Vargas (1606-1656): Quicumque. with the Ministriles de Marsías. NB NB010.
- 2008 - Juan de Anchieta: Missa de Nostra Dona. with the Ministriles de Marsías. NB NB012.
- 2011 - Juan García de Basurto (c.1480-1548) video In agendis mortuorum NB musika.
