= Valentin de Foronda =

Spanish diplomat (1751–1821)

Valentin de Foronda y González de Echávarri (14 January 1751, in Vitoria – 24 December 1821), was Spanish general consul in Philadelphia from 1801 to 1807 and Spanish plenipotentiary minister in the U.S. from 1807 to 1809—tense times because of American ships' lack of discipline in trading with Cuba and the U.S.'s support for Francisco de Miranda, who led an attempted revolution for Venezuelan independence from Spain.

He returned to Spain upon the arrival of Luis Onís, who replaced him, and who was nominated by the "Junta Patriótica" opposed to the invasion of Spain by Napoleon Bonaparte.

He taught at the Basque Institutional School, known as Seminario de Vergara, was promoted to Knight of the Military Order of Santiago in 1793, a Knight of the Order of Carlos III in 1801 and was later a member of the American Philosophical Society in 1802.

In November 1799, De Foronda wrote a letter to the then Spanish Secretary of State Mariano Luis de Urquijo, another Basque, concerning the financial crushing of the "Banco de San Carlos", a precursor to the present-day Bank of Spain, where he had invested the proceeds of the sale of his land and farms. Its reception probably resulted in his diplomatic nomination to the Spanish consulate in Philadelphia.

His "Observaciones sobre algunos puntos de la Obra de Don Quijote", Philadelphia (1807), motivated his inclusion on the shortlist of people phobic against seventeenth-century Spanish writer Miguel de Cervantes (September 29, 1547 – April 23, 1616).
