= Juan García de Basurto =

Spanish composer and cantor

Juan García de Basurto (c.1480–1548) was a Spanish composer and cantor of the Cathedral of Tarazona.

He was active at the time the Flemish Chapel included Pierre de Manchicourt and Philippe Rogier.

Garcia de Basurto first appears as a singer heard during the Holy Week festivities April 1517. His major work is the compiled Requiem mass Missa in agendis mortuorum (1525) which includes parts of Ockeghem's and Brumel's requiems. In 2010 the Spanish group La Capilla Peñaflorida with the Accademia Bizantina of Ottavio Dantone made a video of the agendis mortuorum for NB musika.
