= José Larrañaga Arenas =

Spanish politician (b. 1927, d. 1984)

José Tomás Larrañaga Arenas (popularly known as Txiki or José Txiki) (Azcoitia, 7 March 1926 – Azcoitia, 31 December 1984) was a Spanish politician who was assassinated by the ETA.

== Biography ==
Larrañaga was a politician and businessman. He owned a construction company and served as the leader of the Movimiento Nacional in Guipúzcoa, as well as city councilor in the municipality of Azkoitia during the final years of Francoist Spain. During the Spanish Transition he became a member of the Union of the Democratic Centre (UCD). A native of Azkoitia, following the second attempt on his life he moved to Logroño, where he worked as a District Court Official. At the time of his murder he was married with three children.

== Previous assassination attempts ==
Before his murder, Jose Larrañaga Arenas had been the target of two other assassination attempts. The first attempt occurred on 13 April 1978, when he was attacked at 11:30 p.m. Two people shot at him from a vehicle using a 9mm semi-machine gun. At least 11 shots were fired, with 3 shots striking his left leg, fracturing his fibula.

Almost two years later, on the night of 10 April 1980, José Larrañaga Arenas was again the victim of an assassination attempt. Arenas had just bid a friend farewell and had nearly arrived home when a group of men in a Chrysler or Renault opened fire. After the burst of machine-gun fire the car immediately fled. Arenas was struck only once, and was able to walk to a nearby restaurant and get assistance. First-aid was administered by a doctor who happened to live near the restaurant, and he was taken to a nearby hospital where he was placed in intensive care. He had been shot in his right arm, with the bullet going through one of his lungs and exiting from his sternum. Following the attack, the ETA claimed responsibility in a statement to several media outlets.

== Death ==
José Tomás Larrañaga Arenas was assassinated by the ETA on 31 December 1984 in Azkoitia. Following the multiple attempts on his life, he had moved from his hometown, but had a habit of spending New Year's in Azkoitia. On the night of 31 December 1984 he, along with his wife and brother-in-law came to the city, and he spent the evening with several lifelong friends, including the mayor of Azcoitia, Román Sodupe and José María Sudupe, brother of the president of Executive Committee of the Partido Nacionalista Vasco. He met with friends at a bar in Azkoitia to celebrate the New Year. Upon becoming aware of his presence in the bar, ETA members Miguel Angel Gil Cervera, alias "Kurika", Ignacio Bilbao Beascoechea, alias "Iñaki de Lemona", and Antonio López Ruiz, alias "Kubati" hijacked a car at gunpoint and waited for him to leave the bar. As soon as they saw him leave, "Kurika" and "Iñaki de Lemona" exited the car, approached him from behind, and shot him twice in the head, and once in the chest, killing him instantly. After his body hit the ground, they continued to fire several rounds into his body. For their role in the murder, Ignacio Bilbao Beascoechea and Miguel Angel Gil Cervera were later sentenced to 39 years in prison, and were also ordered to pay 50,000,000 pesetas in compensation to his widow. Following his murder, on 1 January 1985, the municipality of Azkoitia convened an extraordinary plenary session to denounce his assassination. The newspaper Egin said that on 2 January 1985 they received a release from ETA's military claiming responsibility for Jose's murder. The statement said: "He was conscious that ETA had decided to attack him, and therefore decided to move away from the south of Basque Country. He tried to prevent our actions with his displacement, but despite everything that happened he did not resign from continuing his fascist and anti-Basque work. He continued serving fascist structures and making trips to the south of Basque country."

== Bibliography ==
- MERINO, A., CHAPA, A., Roots of liberty. pp. 99–115. FPEV (2011). ISBN 978-84-615-0648-4
- This article makes use of material translated from the corresponding article in the Spanish-language Wikipedia.
