= Bergara =

- Municipality
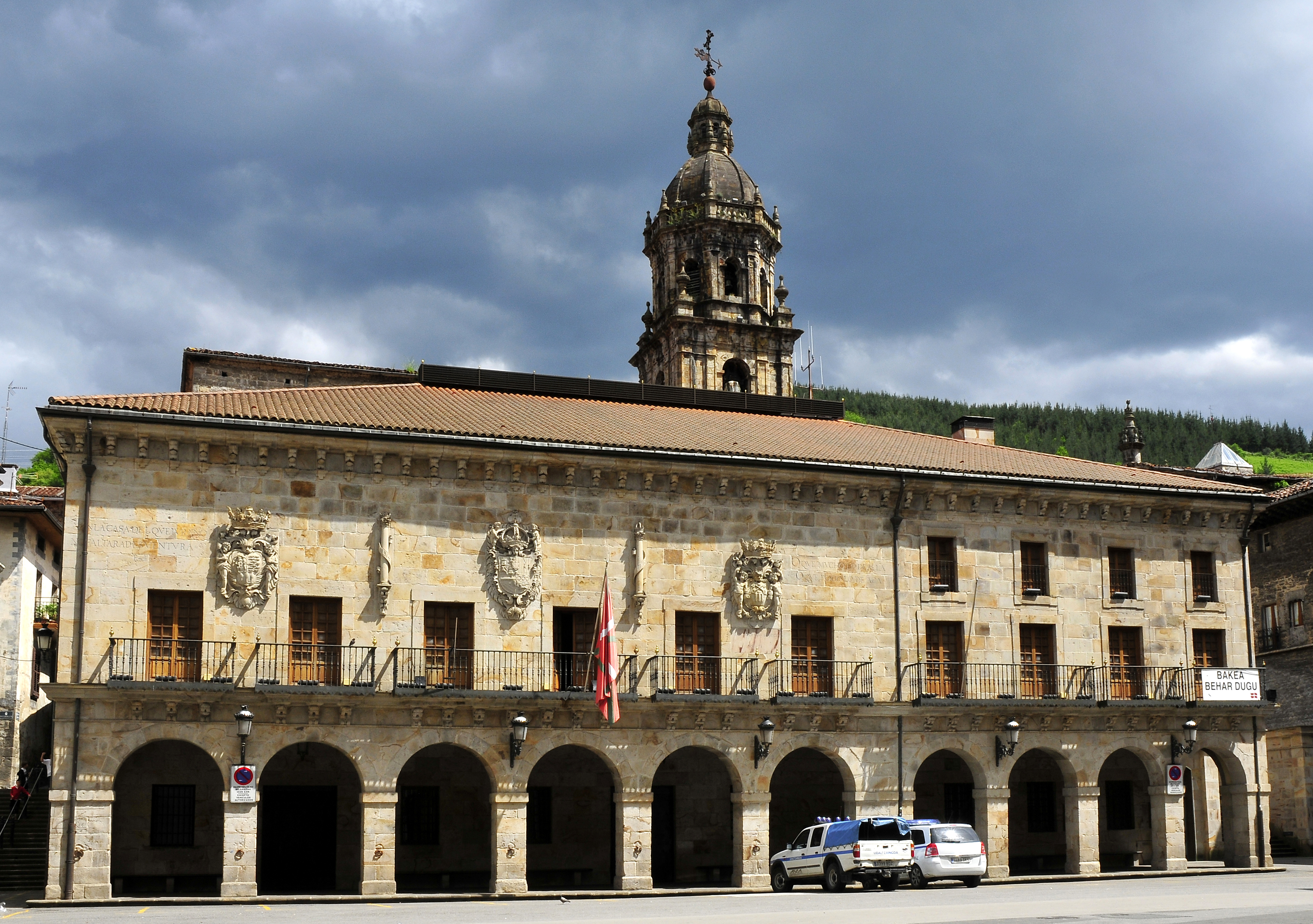
- Town hall

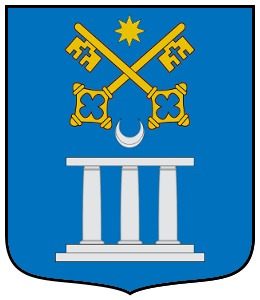
- Coat of arms

- Location of within the Basque Country Location within Spain
- Coordinates: 43°07′03″N 2°24′48″W
- Country: Spain
- Autonomous community: Basque Country
- Province: Gipuzkoa
- Eskualdea: Debagoiena
- Founded: 1268

Government
  - Mayor: Gorka Artola Alberdi (Euskal Herria Bildu)

Area
  - Total: 75.97 km^{2} (29.33 sq mi)

Population (2025-01-01)
  - Total: 14,404
  - Density: 189.6/km^{2} (491.1/sq mi)
- Demonym(s): Basque: bergarar Spanish: vergarés, vergaresa
- Time zone: UTC+1 (CET)
  - Summer (DST): UTC+2 (CEST)
- Postal code: 20570; 20578–20580
- Official language(s): Basque; Spanish
- Website: Official website

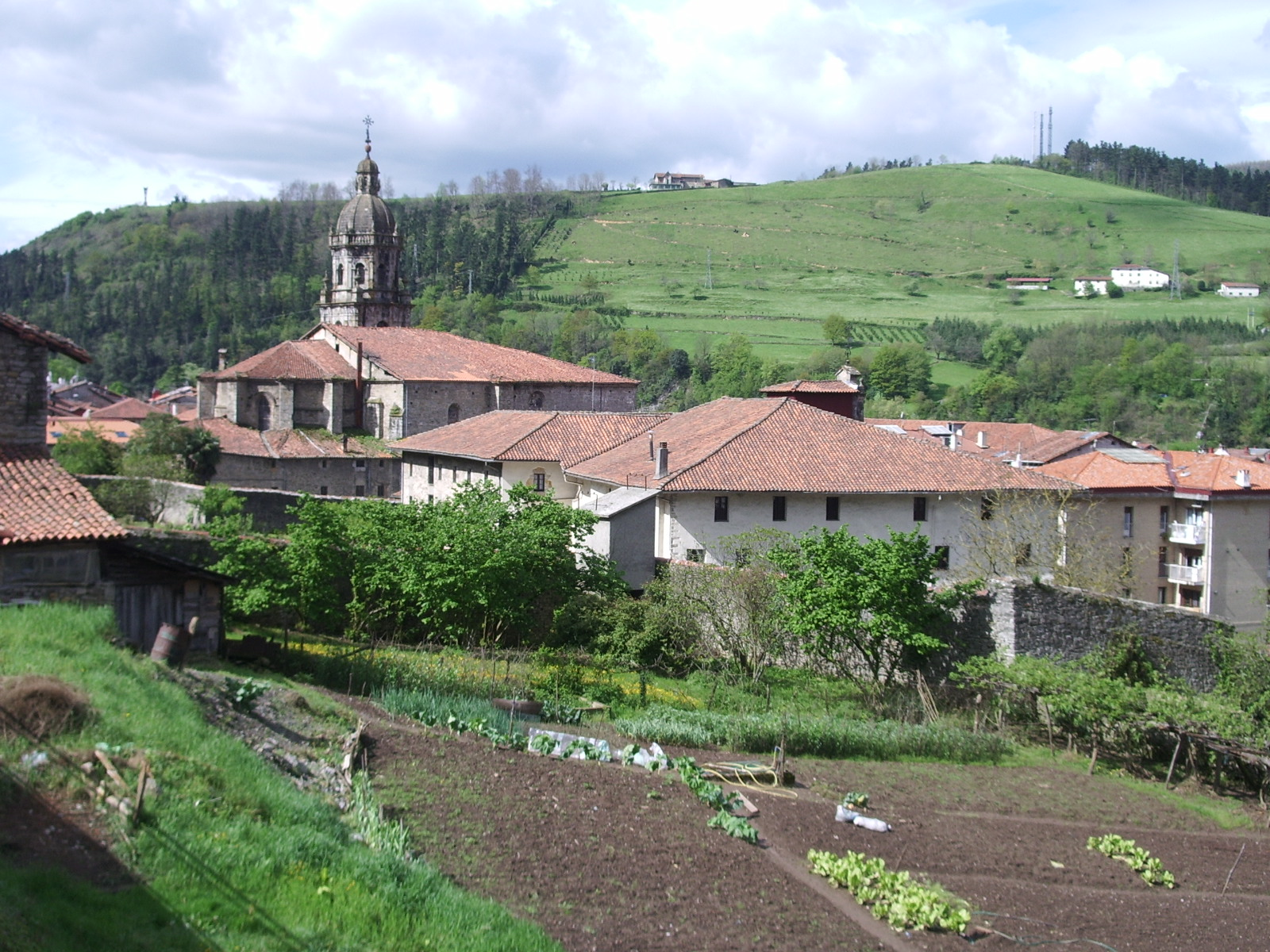
View of historic quarter of Bergara

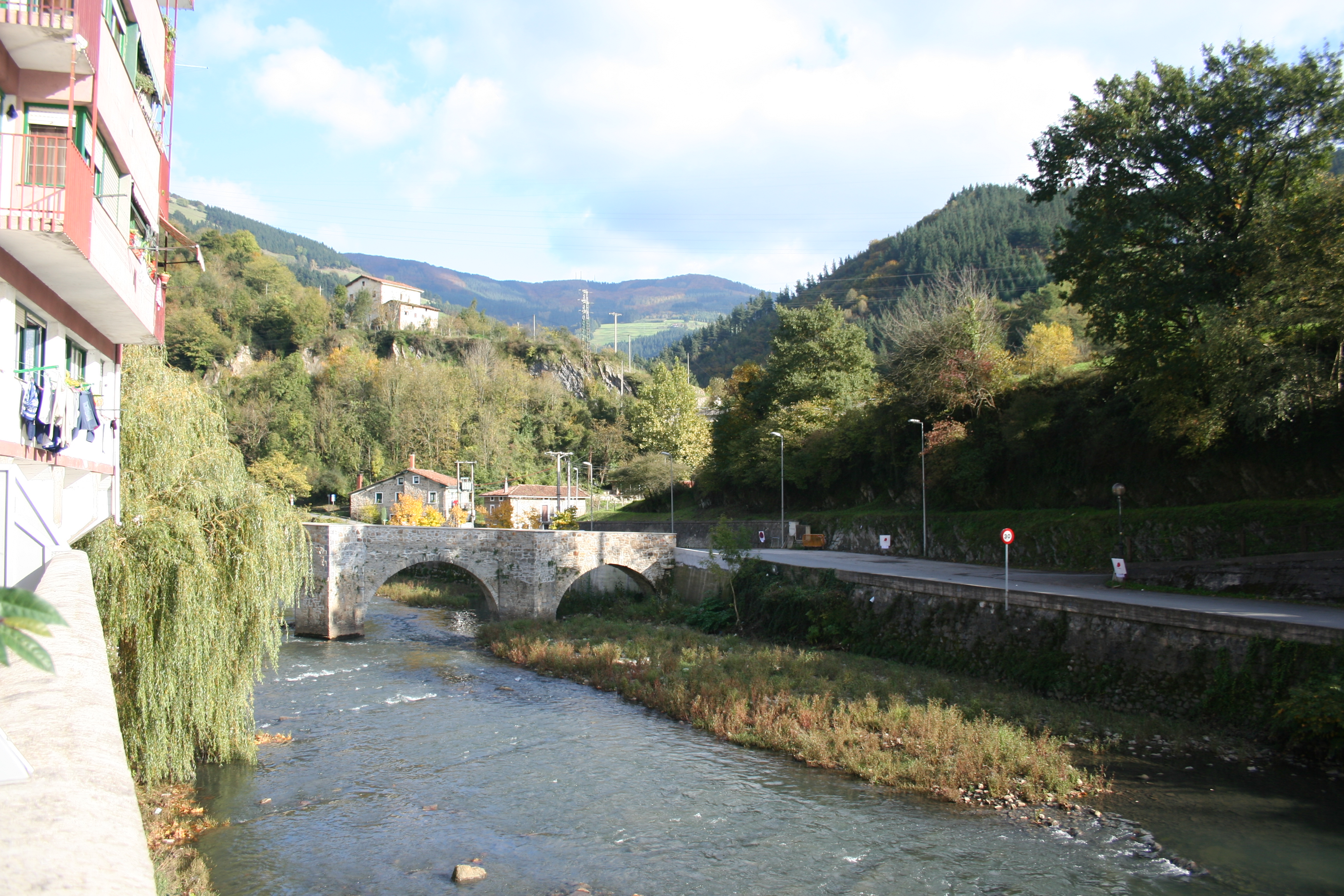
Osintxu neighborhood

Bergara (Basque pronunciation: [berɣaɾa]; Spanish: Vergara) is a town and municipality located in the province of Gipuzkoa, in the autonomous community of Basque Country, in the north of Spain.

An Enlightened center of education operated by the Real Sociedad Bascongada de Amigos del País ("Royal Basque Society of Friends of the Country"), it was the place where brothers Juan José and Fausto Elhuyar discovered Tungsten .

During the Carlist Wars, it operated as the capital and royal court of the Carlists. It was there where the agreement symbolized in the Vergara Embrace between Rafael Maroto and Baldomero Espartero, Prince of Vergara ended one of the period wars.
