= María del Pilar Acedo y Sarriá =

Spanish aristocrat

María del Pilar Acedo y Sarriá (1784–1869), was a Spanish noble, marchioness de Montehermoso, and royal mistress of Joseph Bonaparte during his tenure as king of Spain. She was one of the most famed people in Spain during the reign of Joseph Bonaparte, known for her influential connections, and their affair attracted a lot of attention.

== Life ==
She was born to the Spanish count José María Manuel Acedo y Atodo, II conde de Echauz and Luisa de Sarria y Villafañe. She was a childhood friend of Theresa Cabarrus. She married Ortuño de Aguirre y del Corral, marqués de Montehermoso (1784–1811), in 1800, with whom she had a daughter. She spent most of her early life in Vitoria.

Her father and spouse were members of the Real Sociedad Bascongada de Amigos del País and she lived in an environment of the enlightenment. She was a described as a beauty with liberal anticlerical views who opposed the Inquisition, spoke French and Italian, painted, wrote poetry, played the guitar and the piano and sang. She inherited the title Countess of Vado after her aunt.

In October 1807, her home town of Vitoria was occupied by the French. She met Joseph Bonaparte during his trip to Madrid after he had been appointed king of Spain by Napoleon. He stayed in Vitoria in September 1808, where they became lovers when he was housed in the residence of her and her spouse, the Palace de Montehermoso. She accompanied him to Madrid in November, where she became his mistress and resided with him in the royal palace. Her spouse was given a title by Joseph and was given the task to welcome Napoleon at the border in 1809. In 1811, she resided in Vitoria during Joseph's stay in Paris: her spouse accompanied him and died in France. She left Spain for France with Joseph Bonaparte in March 1813, prior to the Battle of Vitoria. She settled in France, where she died. She first stayed in Barèges, where she gathered a small court around her. In 1816, she married the French noble officer Amadeo de Carabène, and settled in the castle Carresse in Bearn, where she was given the income from her estates in Spain and involved in charity.
