= Josep Cabré =

Catalan bass-baritone singer and choral conductor

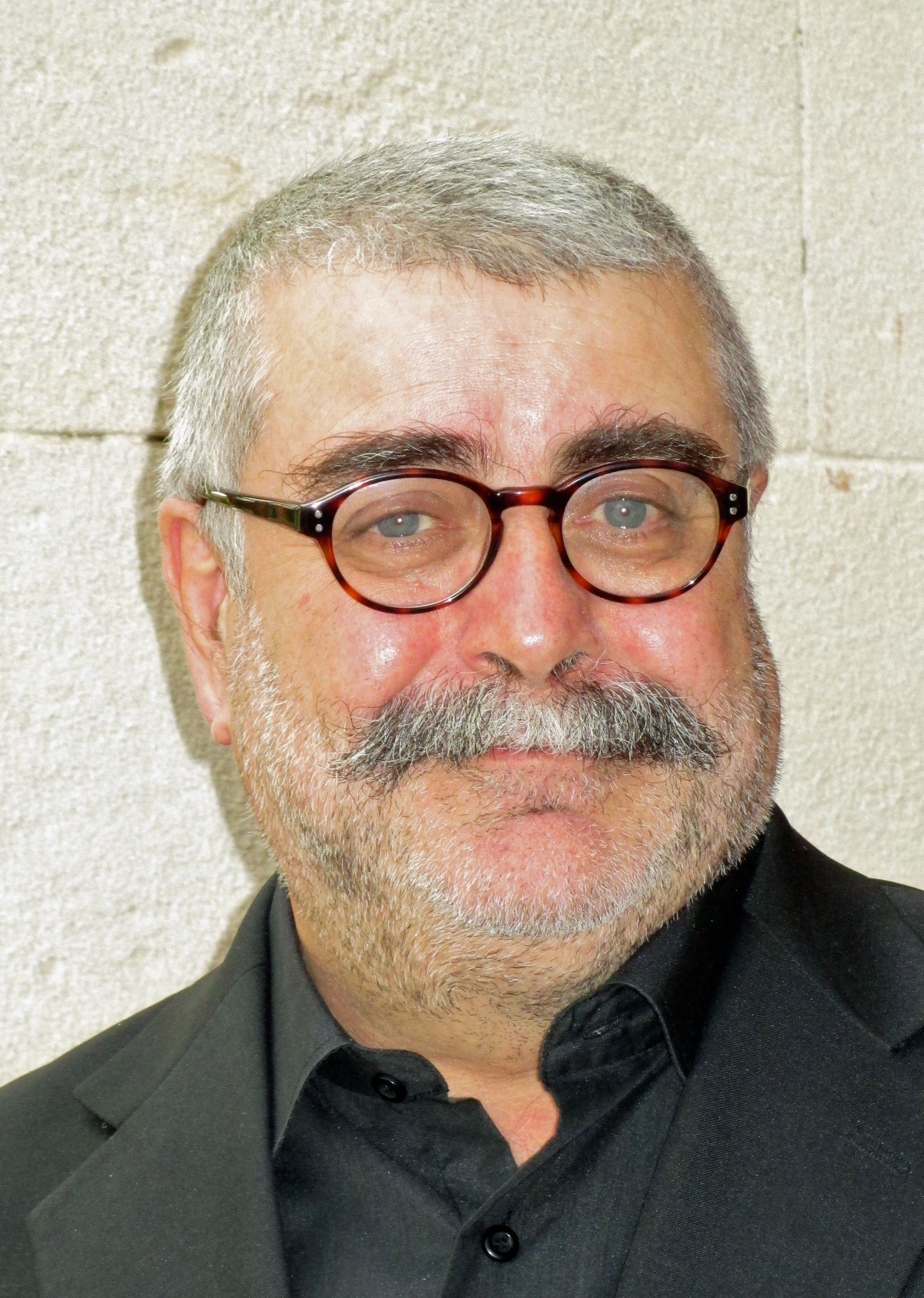
Cabré (3 August 2013)

Josep Cabré Cercós (born 1956 in Barcelona) is a Catalan bass-baritone singer and choral conductor. He is a founder member of the vocal quartet La Colombina (es) with María Cristina Kiehr (soprano), Claudio Cavina (alto), and Josep Benet (tenor). In 1992, Cabré founded La Compañía Musical, an ensemble performing early Spanish and Latin American music. Since 2009 he has been director of the Coral de Cámara de Pamplona. He is also a professor of early music at the Conservatory of the Basque Country "Musikene." Cabré is also a director of the Basque Capilla Peñaflorida.
