= Fausto Elhuyar =

Spanish chemist (1755–1833)

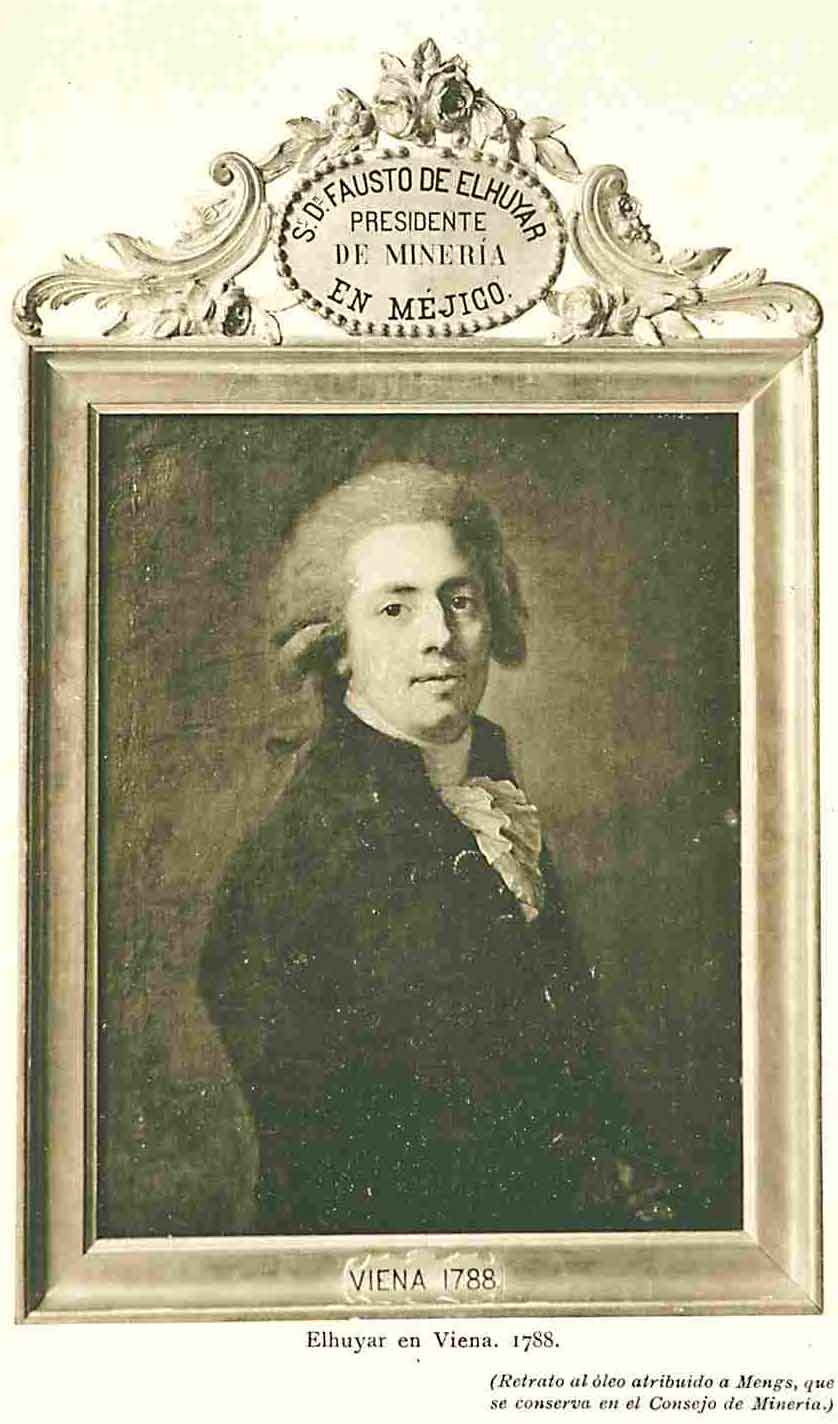
- Fausto Elhuyar
- Born: 11 October 1755; Logroño, Spain
- Died: 6 February 1833 (aged 77); Madrid, Spain
- Known for: Tungsten
- Scientific career
- Fields: Chemistry

Fausto de Elhuyar (11 October 1755 – 6 February 1833) was a Spanish chemist, and the first to isolate tungsten with his brother Juan José Elhuyar in 1783. He was in charge, under a King of Spain commission, of organizing the School of Mines in México City and so was responsible for building the Palacio de Minería, a structure that would house the school. Elhuyar left Mexico after the Mexican War of Independence, when most of the Spanish residents in Mexico were expelled.

== Life ==
He was born in Logroño, La Rioja, Spain son of Basque-French parents from Hasparren, France.

Between 1773 and 1777, Elhúyar studied medicine, surgery and chemistry, as well as mathematics, physics and natural history with his brother Juan José Elhuyar in Paris. After graduating, he returned to Spain, where he exercised himself in the study of mineralogy, specially that of the Basque Country and Navarre, where he resided. In 1781, he was appointed a member of the Real Sociedad Bascongada de Amigos del País (Royal Basque Society of Friends to the Country), an enlightened institution thanks to which he started teaching as professor of mineralogy and metallurgy in Bergara, the seat of both the Vascongada Society and the University of Vergara (nowadays merged with the University of the Basque Country). During those years, he published numerous articles and dossiers about minerals, ways to extract and purify them, etc., which made him famous throughout Europe as one of the top experts on the subject. In 1780, he started working in the Laboratorium Chemicum of Vergara along with François Chavaneau, with whom he was the first to purify platinum. After several months, he was the first person to discover and isolate tungsten, of which he's credited, along with his brother Juan José, as its discoverer. He also collaborated with Joseph-Louis Proust, the famous French chemist at the service of king Charles IV of Spain, who directed the National Laboratory in Segovia.

In 1783, he visited several European universities, such as the School of Mines of Freiberg, at which he lectured on metallurgy and mine machinery; the University of Uppsala, where he collaborated with Torbern Olof Bergman; and Köping, where he visited Carl Wilhelm Scheele, the one who announced Elhúyar's discovery of tungsten, and for some reason is credited for having made the discovery himself.

After his return to Spain, in 1785 he renounced his professorship and, in July 1786, was appointed General Director of Mines in Mexico. Before departing to his new office, he toured Europe again from 1786 to 1788 in order to study Born's method on refining silver. During this trip, he married Joan Raab in Vienna, in 1787. For the next thirty three years, he resided in Mexico City, where the crown founded the capital's School of Mines (January 1, 1792), with Elhuyar as its first director. During his tenure, he commissioned and directed the construction of that institution's seat, the Palacio de Minería, which was finished in 1813 and is considered one of the jewels of the Spanish American neoclassicism. He also visited and improved several of the existing Royal Mines of Mexico, dramatically increasing their productivity due to the introduction of new methods of exploitation. He aided Alexander von Humboldt during his time in New Spain, along with other mining experts then in Mexico, allowing Humboldt's section on mining in his Political essay on the Kingdom of New Spain to be replete with statistics and insights.

After Mexican Independence, he returned to Spain, where, due to his wide experience in modern minery methods, he was appointed Minister of Minery in 1822, and supervised the modern mining of the mines in Almadén, Guadalcanal, and Río Tinto. After falling from his ministry, he was appointed yet again General Director of Mines, and resumed his research activities in chemistry from this quieter office till his death in Madrid on January 6, 1833.
