= Rafael García Granados =

Mexican historian

Rafael García Granados (February 20, 1893 – 1955) was a Mexican historian.

== Books ==
- Huexotsingo. La ciudad y el convento franciscano (1934)
- Xochimilco (1934)
- Sillería del coro de la Antigua iglesia de San Agustín, 2 volumes (1941)
- Diccionario biográfico de historia Antigua de Méjico, 3 volumes (1952–1953)
- El hospital de Jesús, published posthumously (1956)
