= Liburuklik =

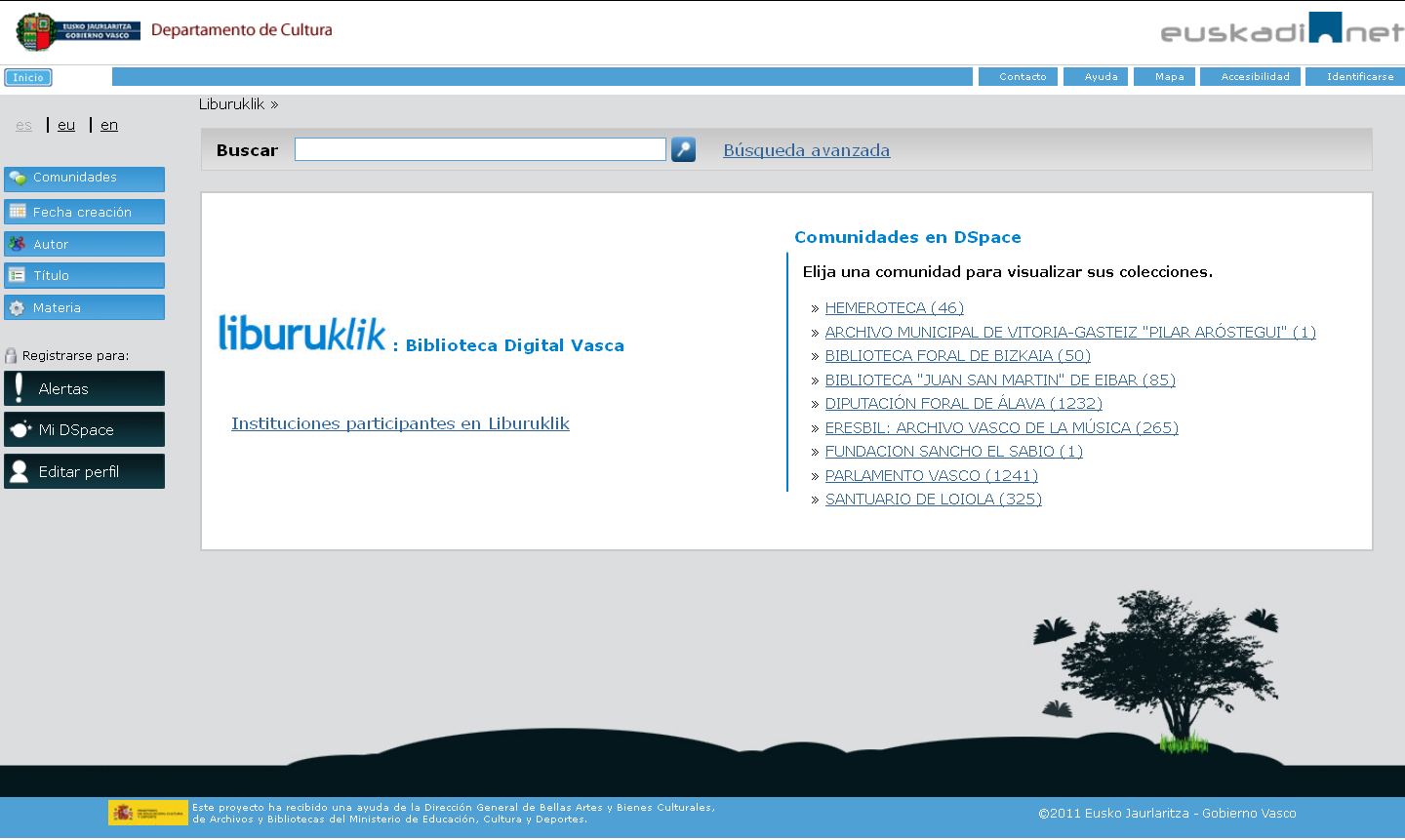
Liburuklik - Biblioteca Digital Vasca 2012

Liburuklik (est. 2011) is a digital library of publications related to the Basque. It includes items from Ondarenet and from contributing institutions such as the Arabako Foru Aldundia, Basque Parliament, and Sancho el Sabio Foundation. The Basque Government oversees the project.
