= Juan García de Salazar =

Spanish baroque composer

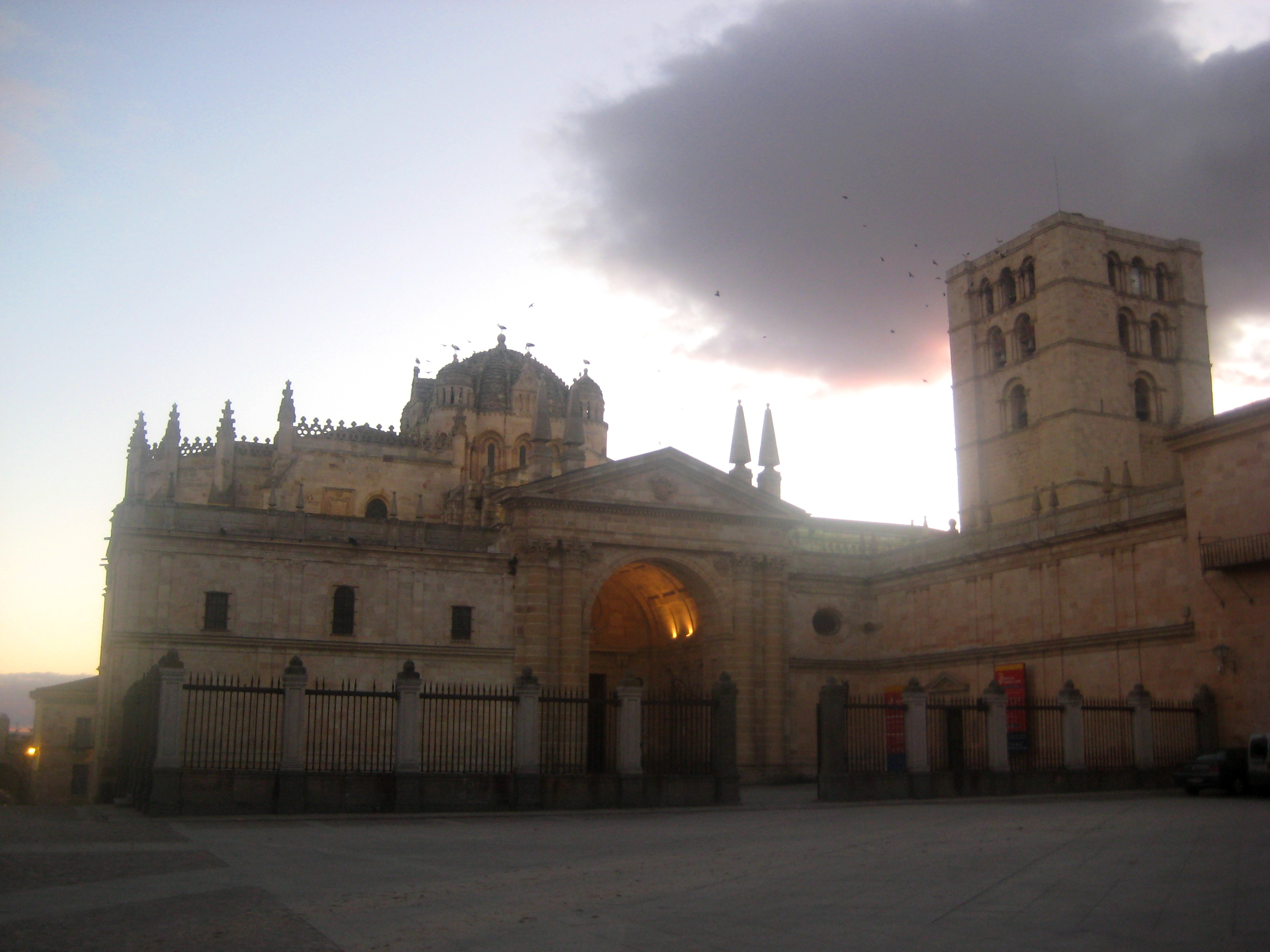
The cathedral of Zamora

Juan García de Salazar (12 February 1639 (baptized) – 8 July 1710) was a Spanish baroque composer best remembered for his choral works in the stile antico, though a few Spanish works in a more modern style have also survived.

Salazar was born in Tuesta, Álava. He was educated in the Burgos cathedral choir and became maestro de capilla at Toro (1661), El Burgo de Osma (1663) and finally at Zamora in 1668. He died in Zamora, Spain.

== Works ==
- Vesper psalms
- Requiem
