= Juan José Elhuyar =

Spanish chemist (1754–1796)

- Born: 15 June 1754; Logroño
- Died: 20 September 1796 (age 42); Santafé de Bogotá, New Granada
- Known for: Tungsten
- Scientific career
- Fields: Chemistry; Mineralogy

Juan José Elhuyar Lubize (15 June 1754 – 20 September 1796) was a Spanish chemist and mineralogist, who was best known for being first to isolate tungsten with his brother Fausto Elhuyar in 1783.

He was born in Logroño, in northern Spain and died in Santafé de Bogotá, New Granada (present-day Colombia) at 42.
