= Real Sociedad Bascongada de Amigos del País =

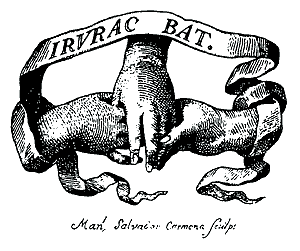
- Emblem of the society, featuring the Basque motto "Irurac bat" (The three in one)
- Formation: 1765
- Headquarters: Azcoitia, Basque Country, Spain
- Founder: Xavier María de Munibe e Idiáquez

The Royal Basque Society of Friends of the Country (Basque: Euskalerriaren Adiskideen Elkartea; Spanish: Real Sociedad Bascongada de Amigos del País), also known as La Bascongada or Bascongada Society, was founded in the mid-18th century to encourage the scientific, cultural and economic development of the Basque Country.

== Establishment ==
The founding members were the Knights of Azcoitia or the Triumvirate of Azcoitia, under the encouragement of Xavier María de Munibe e Idiáquez, count of Peñaflorida, José María de Eguía, marquis of Narros, and the encyclopedist and Enlightenment scholar Manuel Ignacio de Altuna. The blueprint for its constitution was drafted in 1763 in Vergara and approved in 1765. Its inception is inextricably linked to the economic momentum spurred by the activity of the Guipuzcoana Company.

== Importance for the arts, culture, and the territory ==
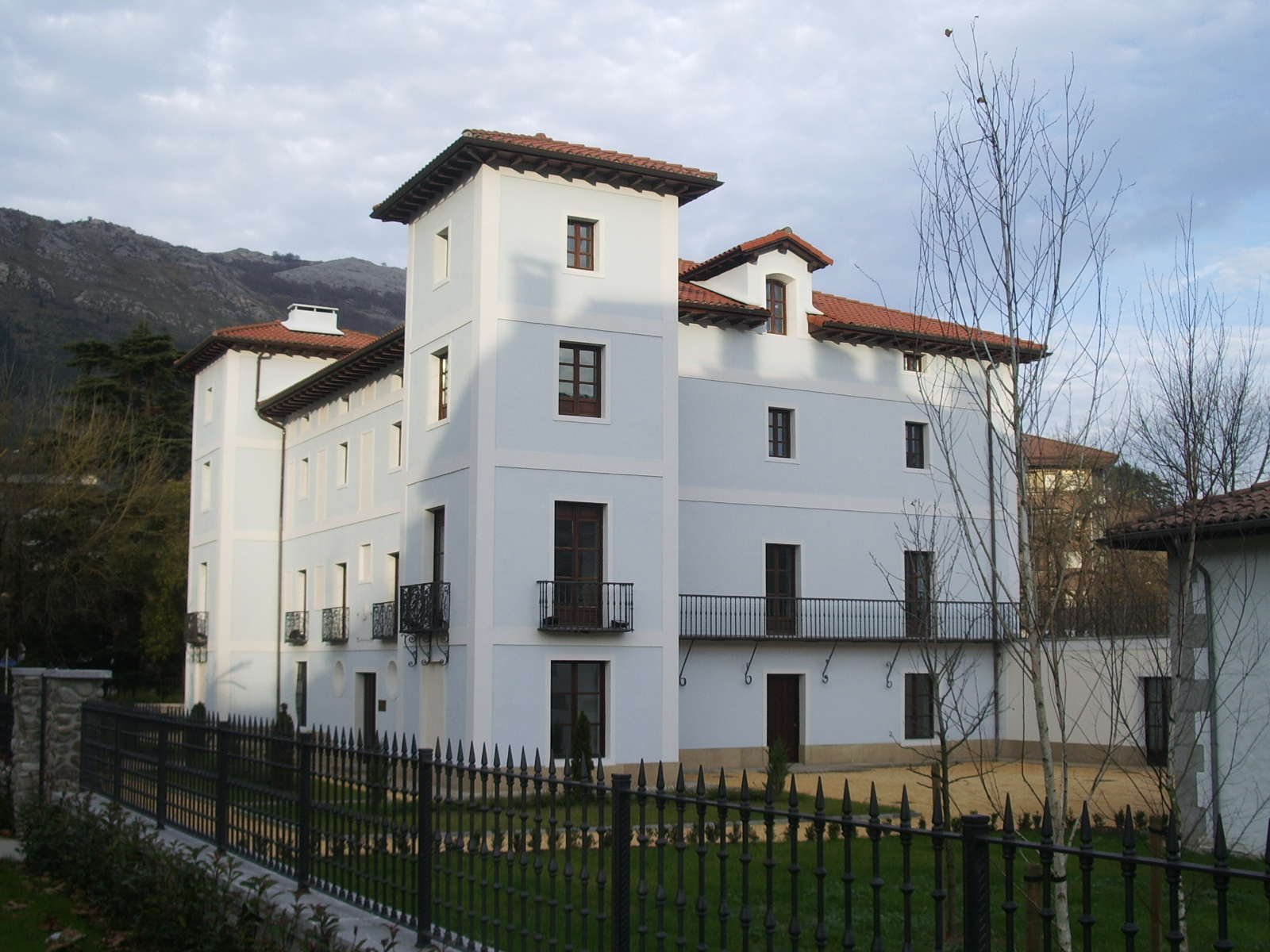
Insausti palace in Azcoitia, the main headquarters of the association

The establishment of the society was followed by the founding of the Seminar of Vergara a decade later (1776), the first higher education institution to operate in Basque territory. Research carried out by Fausto Elhuyar and brother Juan Jose in the seminar led to their isolating of the chemical element tungsten, and Ignacio de Zavala came up with the procedure to obtain cast steel. In music the Society sponsored the work of composer José de Larrañaga. Literary activity was conducted by Félix María de Samaniego and others.

The Society was the first institution in Modern Age to ever regroup any Basque districts into a sole cluster out of common concerns—they operated on their own up to that point. It was also the first society of its kind in the Basque Country and Spain, with societies cut out after its pattern spreading soon afterwards all over Spain, and the New World.

== Historical members or "friends" ==
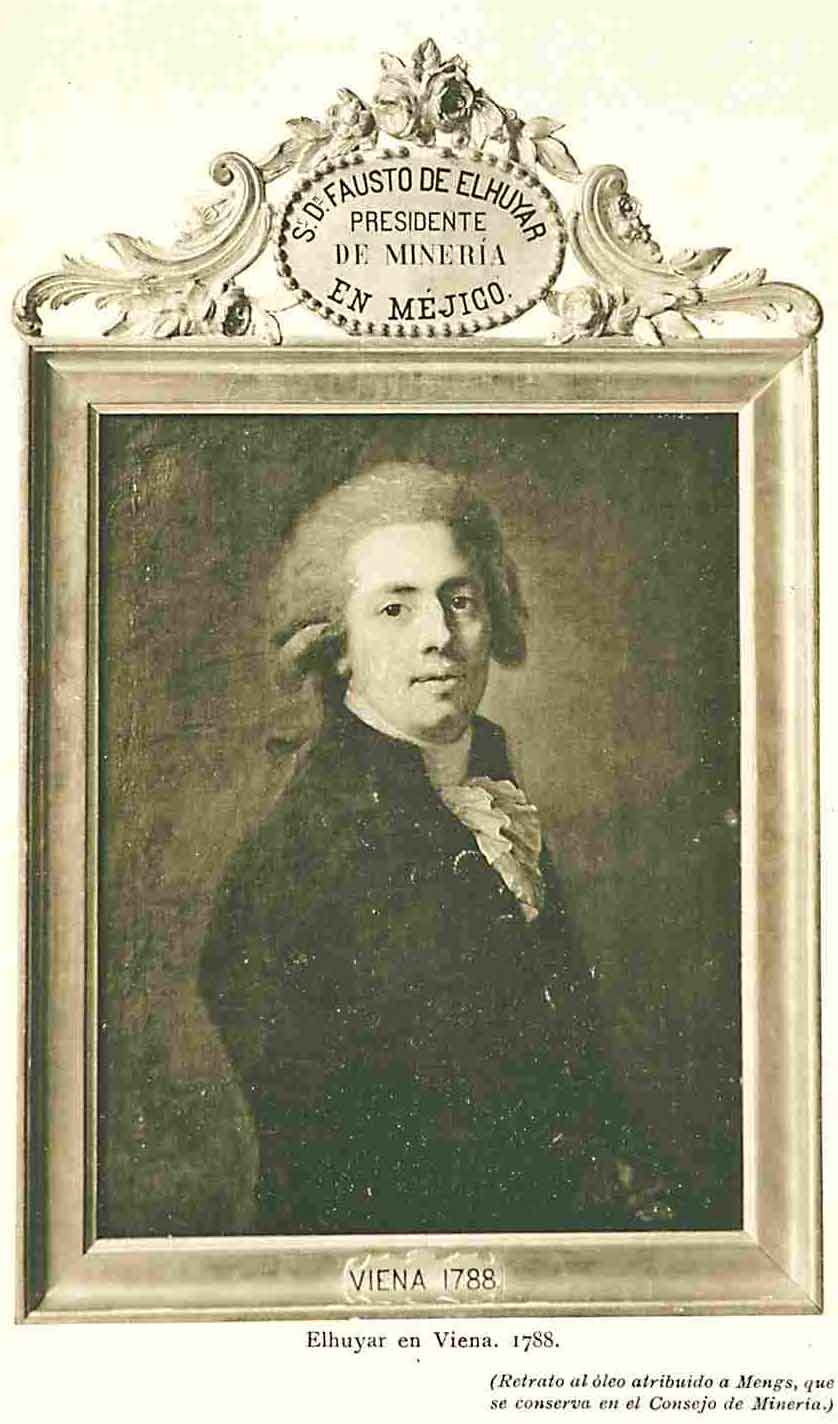
Fausto Elhuyar (1755–1833), chemist and joint discoverer of tungsten

- Pablo de Olavide (1725–1803), politician, lawyer and writer born in Perú.
- José de Larrañaga (1728–1806), Franciscan friar and composer.
- Félix María de Samaniego (1745–1801), neoclassical fabulist.
- Jose de Mazarredo y Salazar (1745–1812), naval commander, cartographer, ambassador, astronomer and professor of naval tactics.
- Valentin de Foronda y González de Echávarri (1751–1821), Spanish General Consul in Philadelphia from 1801 to 1807 and Spanish Plenipotentiary Minister in the U.S. from 1807 to 1809.
- Fausto Elhuyar (1755–1833), chemist, and the joint discoverer of tungsten with his brother Juan José Elhuyar in 1783.
- Cosme Damián de Churruca y Elorza (1761–1805), naval admiral and scientist.
- Diego de Borica (1742–1800), Governor of the Californias from 1794 to 1800.
- Josefina Muriel (1918–2008), writer, historian, researcher, bibliophile, academic; Order of Isabella the Catholic by the government of Spain in 1966.

== Organisation Today ==
- Director: Mikel Badiola González, lawyer and professor of administrative law at the University of Deusto
- Deputy director: Juan José Pujana Arza, lawyer and politician, first president of the Basque Parliament and former senator in Parliament of Spain.
- General Secretary: Joseba Sobrino Aranzabe
- Treasurer: Joseba Jaureguizar Bilbao, General Director of Tecnalia
- President of the commission of Alava: Amelia Baldeón Iñigo
- President of the commission of Biscay: Lorenzo Goikoetxea Oleaga
- President of the commission of Gipuzkoa: Juan Bautista Mendizabal Juaristi
- President of the delegation in the Courts: Íñigo López de Uralde Garmendia
- President of the delegation in Mexico: Ana Rita Valero de García Lascurain
