= Azkoitia =

- Municipality
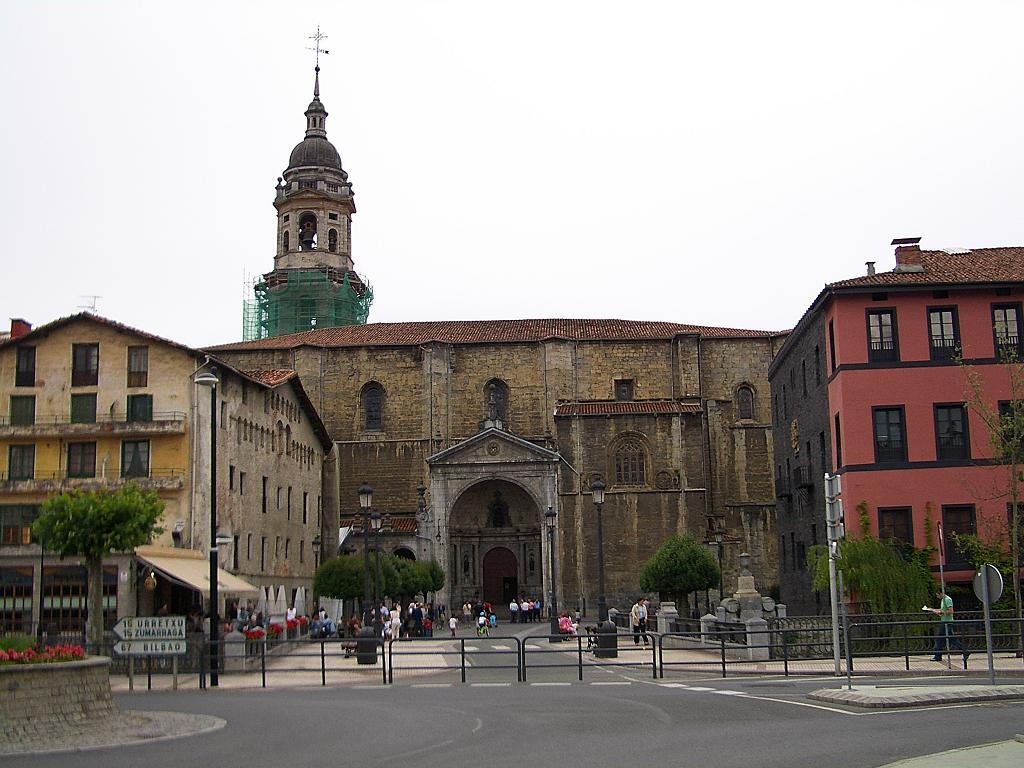
- Azkoitia's central square, with Paroquia Santa Maria La Real

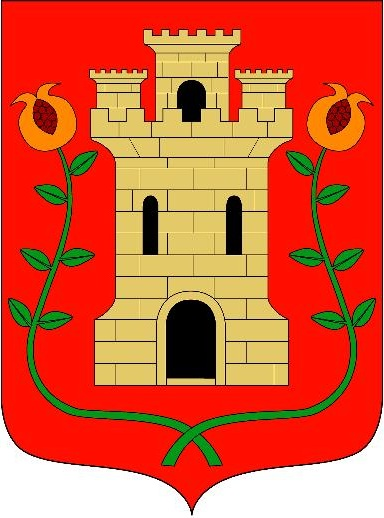
- Coat of arms

- Location of Azkoitia within the Basque Autonomous Community
- Coordinates: 43°10′45″N 2°18′38″W
- Country: Spain
- Autonomous community: Basque Country
- Province: Gipuzkoa
- Comarca: Urola Kosta
- Founded: 1331

Government
  - Mayor: Ana Azkoitia (Basque Nationalist Party)

Area
  - Total: 54.71 km^{2} (21.12 sq mi)
- Elevation: 113 m (371 ft)

Population (2025-01-01)
  - Total: 11,774
  - Density: 215.2/km^{2} (557.4/sq mi)
- Demonym: Spanish: azcoitano
- Time zone: UTC+1 (CET)
  - Summer (DST): UTC+2 (CEST)
- Postal code: 20720
- Website: Official website

Azkoitia (Spanish: Azcoitia) is a town located in the province of Gipuzkoa, in the Autonomous Community of Basque Country, in northern Spain. It is also the seat of the municipality of the same name.

== Geographical setting ==
Azkoitia and the municipality of the same name, are located on and around the upper Urola river valley, centered on a small alluvial plain surrounded by the Basque Mountains. Except for the valley itself, the terrain is rather rugged, with elevations ranging to little less than 950 meters.

== Population ==
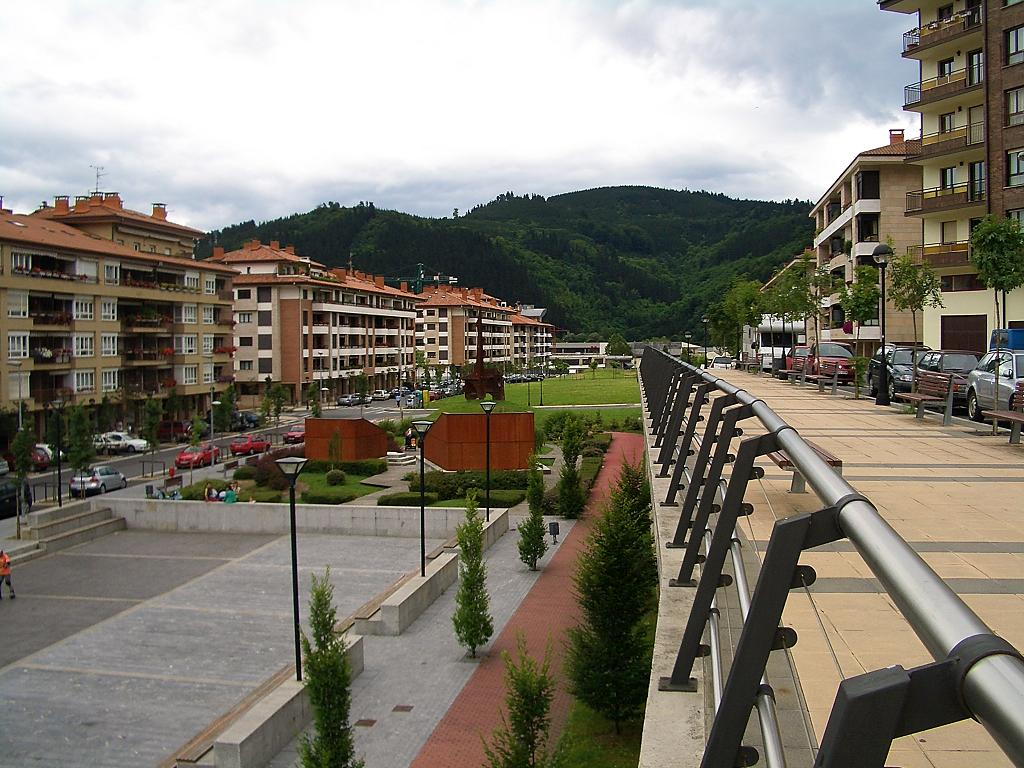
A boulevard across the river from Azkoitia's old central square

As of 2004, the municipality numbered 10,946 inhabitants, of whom 5,324 (49.867%) were men and 5,262 (50.133%) were women. Age is distributed among the sexes rather evenly with children and adolescents (0 to 17 years of age) forming 16.235% of the population, adults (18 to 54 years of age) making up 53.744%, and senior citizens forming the remaining 30.021%.

== Historical relevance ==
Azkoitia was the birthplace of the mother of Saint Ignatius of Loyola, founder of the Jesuit religious order. Ignatius' maternal grandfather, Don Martin Garcia de Licona, had purchased Balda Tower in the mid-15th century. Recurring bloody encounters in the region persuaded the king, Henry IV of Castile, to reduce the tower from a fortress to a courthouse. On 13 July 1467 Don Martin's daughter, Dona Marina Saenz de Licona Balda married Don Beltran Ibanez de Onaz y Loyola from neighbouring Azpeitia in the Licona family home in Azkoitia. The original wedding contract still exists.

Loyola's birth house is still preserved as a museum a part of a large Jesuit compound. It is located a few kilometers east of Azkoitia's city center, at the small community of Azpeitia, and is a major tourist attraction.

== See also ==
- José Larrañaga Arenas

== Notes ==
1. Demographics for all Basque municipalities
