= Rovira (surname) =

Rovira (Eastern Catalan: [ruˈβiɾə]) is a surname of Catalan origin. It is derived from the Latin: robereda, "oak grove", meaning that it is etymologically akin to another Catalan surname, Roureda. Variants of Rovira include Rovires, Robira, Ruvira, Rubira, Rubires, Roïra and Ruyra, as well as the compound forms Roviralta, Roviro, Rovireta, Rovirola and Rubirosa.

== List of persons with the surname ==
- Gaspar de Portolá i Rovira (1716–1786), Spanish Catalan noble, soldier, explorer
- Antoni Rovira i Virgili (1882–1949), Spanish Catalan politician
- Antoni Rovira i Trias (1816–1889), Spanish Catalan architect
- Carlos Rovira (born 1956), Argentine politician
- Custodio García Rovira (1780–1816), Neogranadine general and statesman
- Francesc Rovira i Sala (1764–1820), priest and partisan leader of the Peninsular War
- Francisco Rovira Beleta (1913–1999), Spanish Catalan screenwriter and film director
- Jacme Rovira (fl. 1380s), medieval Catalan poet
- Josep Rovira Soler (1900–1998), Spanish Catalan painter
- Josep-Lluís Carod-Rovira (born 1952), Spanish Catalan politician
- José Miguel Rovira (c. 1920–1993), Puerto Rican industrialist
- Luis D. Rovira (1923–2011), justice of the Colorado Supreme Court
- Pere de Rovira (1143–1158), Catalonia, Spain, Knights Templar (First Provincial Master)
- Teresa Rovira i Comas (1918-2014), Spanish Catalan librarian

== Others ==
- Rovira Biscuits Corporation, the crackers company
