= Rovira =

Rovira may refer to:

- Rovira, Tolima, Colombia
- Rovira, Chiriquí, Panama
- Rovira (surname)
