= Bases de Manresa =

Project to create a self-governing body for Catalonia and to reform the Spanish state

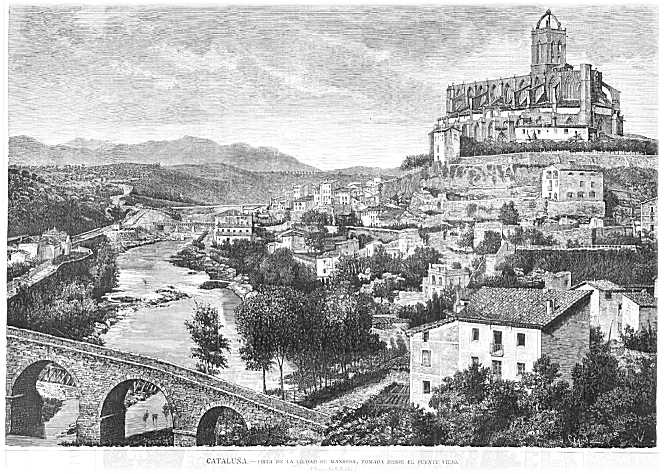
Manresa in 1881.

The Bases for the Catalan Regional Constitution (in Catalan: Bases per a la Constitució Regional Catalana, Spanish: Bases para la Constitución Regional Catalana), better known as the Manresa Bases (Bases de Manresa), is the document presented as a draft Catalan regional constitution for a constitution by the Unió Catalanista to the council of representatives of Catalanist associations, which met in Manresa (Barcelona) on 25 and 27 March 1892 at the initiative of the Regionalist League of Catalonia. The Bases de Manresa are often considered to be the "birth certificate of political Catalanism", at least that of conservative roots.

== Background ==
In 1887 the Centre Català underwent an acute crisis as a result of the split between the two currents that made it up, one more left-wing and federalist, led by Valentí Almirall, and the other more Catalanist and conservative, grouped around the newspaper La Renaixensa. The latter current had produced an important work published in 1878 under the title Los Fueros de Cataluña (The Charters of Catalonia), authored by Josep Coroleu and Josep Pella i Forgas. After a statement that "from the splendid variety with which Providence has graciously endowed Catalonia has sprung the characteristic genius of her children" —"her fierce liberty, her practical sense"— the ancient laws that governed the Principality of Catalonia are explained, organised in articles, as if they were a Constitution, accompanied by long digressions.

The first article states: "The Catalan nation is the gathering of the peoples who speak the Catalan language. Its territory comprises: Catalonia, with the counties of Roussillon and Cerdagne; the Kingdom of Valencia; the Kingdom of Majorca". The conservative nature of the work is evident, for example, in Article 51, which states that "only citizens who are heads of families have the right to appoint and be appointed" to the popular arm, since the Cortes will be of a statal nature, or in Article 39, which states: "Since the religion of the Catalans is Catholic, apostolic and Roman, it is not licit for any layman to discuss publicly or privately about its dogmas". It also demanded that military service be carried out in Catalonia and that "only Catalans born in the Principality and not those naturalised by privilege who are in full enjoyment of their citizenship may obtain ecclesiastical benefits and offices in Catalonia and exercise jurisdiction, public office, employment or military command in Catalonia and the Kingdom of Majorca". After denying the legitimacy of the Spanish constituent processes initiated in the Cortes of Cadiz, Coroleu and Pella concluded that Spain must repair "the imprescriptible rights of its peoples" oppressed by "the despotism of foreign dynasties [sic]" and the "Jacobinism of infamous politicians".

The members of the conservative tendency left the Centre Catalá in November 1887 to found the Lliga de Catalunya, which was joined by the Centre Escolar Catalanista, an association of university students that included the future leaders of Catalan nationalism: Enric Prat de la Riba, Francesc Cambó and Josep Puig i Cadafalch. From that moment on, Catalan nationalist hegemony passed from the Centre Català to the Lliga, which during the Jocs Florals of 1888 presented a second memorial of wrongs to the Queen Regent in which, among other things, they asked "that the Catalan nation should once again have its free and independent general courts", voluntary military service, "the official Catalan language in Catalonia", education in Catalan, a Catalan Supreme Court and that the king should swear "in Catalonia his fundamental constitutions".

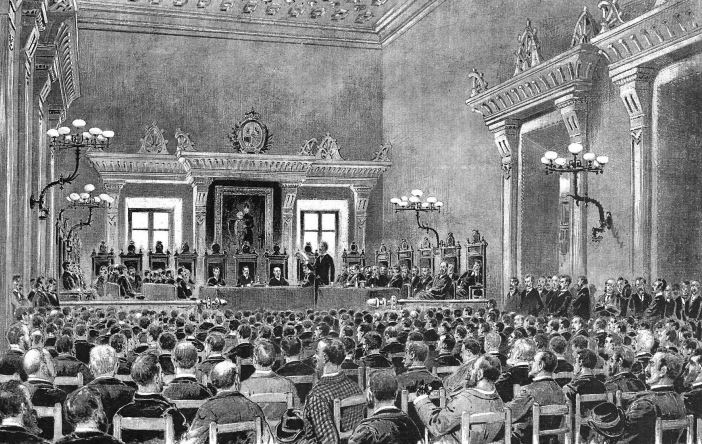
The Manresa Assembly (engraving from La Ilustració Catalana, no. 282, 15 April 1892).

In 1891 the Lliga de Catalunya proposed the formation of the Unió Catalanista, which immediately gained the support of Catalanist organisations and newspapers, and also of individuals —unlike what had happened four years earlier with the failed Gran Consell Regional Català proposed by Bernat Torroja, President of the Associació Catalanista de Reus, which was intended to bring together the presidents of Catalanist organisations and the editors of related newspapers—. In March 1892, the Unió held its first assembly in Manresa, attended by 250 delegates representing some 160 localities, where the Bases per a la Constitució Regional Catalana, better known as the Bases de Manresa, were approved.

The presidency was held by Lluís Domènech i Montaner and Enric Prat de la Riba acted as secretary. The commission in charge of drafting the Bases was chaired by the priest Josep Torras i Bages.

== Content ==
Base 1 dealt with central power and the rest (Bases 2 to 17) with regional power. According to the historians Jaume Claret and Manuel Santirso, the Bases moved away from both the federalist project and the possibilism of the Memorial of Wrongs of 1885 to advocate a return to the Catalonia of pre-1714, as can be seen especially in Base 2, which preserves the old Catalan legislation; Base 3, which establishes that the Catalan language will be the only language that, [with] official character, can be used in Catalonia and in the relations of this region [with] the central power; Base 4, which reserves public posts for the natives of Catalonia; or Base 7 which establishes an annual Cortes elected by corporate suffrage of all the heads of families grouped in classes based on manual labour, on skills or professional careers and on property, industry and commerce.

From the regional power, formed by a Cortes that would meet once a year in different parts of the territory, would come an executive made up of five or seven high-ranking officials who would be in charge of the country's administration. The judiciary would remain in the old Court of Catalonia, which would be re-established. The sole official status of the Catalan language, as well as the condition of the Catalan language as a compulsory clause for the exercise of public functions, were also considered. They also established the creation of a corps of volunteers for the formation of an army. The territorial organisation was divided into comarques and municipalities, elements that clearly contradicted a Spanish state that was at that time centralist and uniformising.

According to historians José Luis de la Granja, Justo Beramendi and Pere Anguera, "the Bases are an autonomist project, in no way pro-independence, of a traditional and corporatist nature. Structured in seventeen articles, they advocate the possibility of modernising civil law, the exclusive official status of Catalan, the reservation of public posts, including military posts, the comarca as the basic administrative entity, exclusive internal sovereignty, corporately elected courts, a higher court of last resort, the extension of municipal powers, voluntary military service, a body of public order and its own currency, and education sensitive to Catalan specificity".

=== Original text ===
Central power.

Base 1.ª. Its powers. The central power shall be responsible for

a) International relations.

b) The army at sea and on land, defence works and military education.

c) Spain's economic relations with other countries and, consequently, the fixing of tariffs and customs duties.

d) Construction and maintenance of roads, railways, canals and ports of general interest. The Regions concerned may freely agree on those of inter-regional interest, with the intervention of the Central Power only in the event of disagreement. Roads of regional interest shall be the exclusive competence of the Regions: The same criterion shall be followed for Postal and Telegraph services.

e) The resolution of all inter-regional problems and conflicts.

f) Formation of the annual expenditure budget, which, insofar as customs revenues are not sufficient, shall be distributed among the Regions in proportion to their wealth.

Regional Power.

Base 2. In the dogmatic part of the Catalan regional constitution, it shall maintain the expansive temperament of our ancient legislation, reforming, in order to bring them into line with new needs, the wise provisions it contains with regard to the rights and liberties of the Catalans.

Base 3. The Catalan language shall be the only language which may be used officially in Catalonia and in the relations of this region with the central power.

Base 4. Only Catalans, whether by birth or by naturalisation, may hold public office in Catalonia, including governmental and administrative posts which depend on the central government. Military posts involving jurisdiction shall also be held by Catalans.

Base 5. The territorial division of the hierarchy of governmental, administrative and judicial powers shall be based on the natural region and the municipality.

Base 6. Catalonia shall be the sole sovereign of its internal government, and therefore shall freely dictate its organic laws; it shall be responsible for its civil, criminal, mercantile, administrative and procedural legislation; the establishment and collection of taxes; the minting of coins; and it shall have all other powers inherent to sovereignty and which do not correspond to the central power in accordance with Base 1.

Base 7. Regional legislative power shall be vested in the Catalan Cortes, which shall meet every year at a fixed time and in a different place. The Cortes shall be formed by suffrage of all heads of families, grouped by classes based on manual labour, ability or professional careers and on property, industry and commerce through the corresponding corporation organisation where possible.

Base 8. The judiciary shall be organised by re-establishing the former Audiència de Catalunya; its President and Vice-President, appointed by the Cortes, shall constitute the supreme judicial authority of the region, and such lower courts as may be necessary shall be established, and all lawsuits and cases shall be decided within a specific period of time and in the final instance within Catalonia. Special jurisdictions such as the industrial and commercial courts shall be organised. Judicial officers shall be responsible.

Base 9. Executive power shall be exercised by five or seven high-ranking officials appointed by the Cortes, who shall be in charge of the various branches of the regional administration.

Base 10. The natural comarca shall be granted the widest possible range of administrative powers to govern its interests and satisfy its needs. A Council shall be organised in each district, appointed by the municipalities thereof, which shall exercise the aforementioned powers.

Base 11. The municipality shall be granted all the powers it needs to look after its own exclusive interests. For the election of municipal offices, the same system of representation by class adopted for the formation of the Cortes shall be followed.

Base 12. Catalonia shall contribute to the formation of the standing army of land and sea by means of volunteers or by means of a cash compensation agreed upon in advance as before 1845. The army corps corresponding to Catalonia shall be fixed and the volunteers to which it contributes shall belong. The reserve to which all boys of a given age will be subject shall be established with regional organisation.

Base 13. The preservation of public order and internal security in Catalonia shall be entrusted to the Sometent, and for permanent active service a corps similar to that of the Mossos d'Esquadra or the Guardia Civil shall be created. All these forces shall depend solely on the regional power.

Base 14. In the minting of currency, Catalonia shall be subject to the unitary rates agreed upon by the Regions and the international treaties of Monetary Union, and Catalan currency, like that of the other Regions, shall be compulsory throughout Spain.

Base 15. Public education in its different grades and branches shall be organised in a manner appropriate to the needs and character of the civilisation of Catalonia. Teaching plans shall be based on the principle of dividing and specialising courses of study, avoiding encyclopaedic teaching.

Base 16. The Catalan Constitution and the rights of the Catalans shall be under the safeguard of the Catalan executive power and any citizen shall be able to sue before the courts any civil servants who infringe them.

Manresa, 27th March 1892. By agreement of the Assembly of Delegates of the Unió Catalanista. The President: Lluis Domenech i Montaner. The Secretaries: Joseph Soler i Palet; Enrich Prat de la Riba.

La Ilustració Catalana, 12 August 1907.

== Bibliography ==
- Claret, Jaume; Santirso, Manuel (2014). La construcción del catalanismo. Historia de un afán político (in Spanish). Madrid: Los Libros de la Catarata. ISBN 978-84-8319-898-8.
- De la Granja, José Luis; Beramendi, Justo; Anguera, Pere (2001). La España de los nacionalismos y las autonomías (in Spanish). Madrid: Síntesis. ISBN 84-7738-918-7.
