= Catalan nationalism =

Ideology asserting that the Catalans are a nation

Catalan nationalism promotes the idea that the Catalan people form a distinct nation and national identity. A related term is Catalanism (Catalan: catalanisme, Spanish: catalanismo), which is more related to regionalism and tends to have a wider meaning; most people who define themselves as Catalanist do not necessarily identify as Catalan nationalists.

Intellectually, modern Catalan nationalism can be said to have commenced as a political philosophy in the unsuccessful attempts to establish a federal state in Spain in the context of the First Republic (1873-1874). Valentí Almirall i Llozer and other intellectuals that participated in this process set up a new political ideology in the 19th century, to restore self-government, as well as to obtain recognition for the Catalan language. These demands were summarized in the so-called Bases de Manresa in 1892.

The movement had little support at first. After the Spanish–American War, in which Spain lost the last of their colonies in the Pacific and the Caribbean, these early stages of Catalanism grew in support, mostly because of the weakened Spanish international position after the war and the loss of the two main destinations for Catalan exports (Cuba and Puerto Rico).

== Origins of Catalan national identity ==
Diachronic map of the realms of the Crown of Aragon, including the Principality of Catalonia in light green

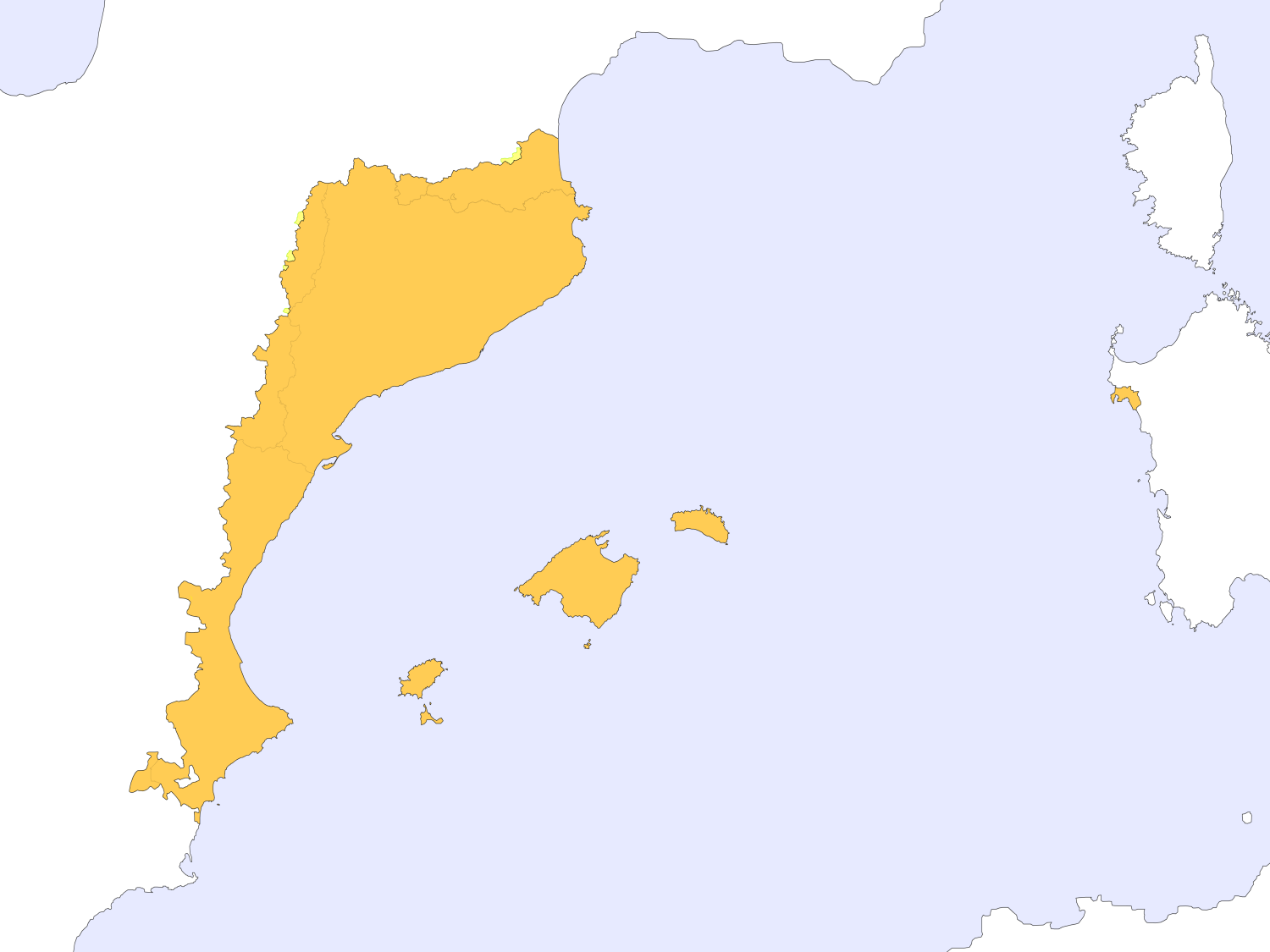
Areas of Catalan language

Miniature (15th century) of the General Court of the Principality of Catalonia, presided over by Ferdinand II of Aragon

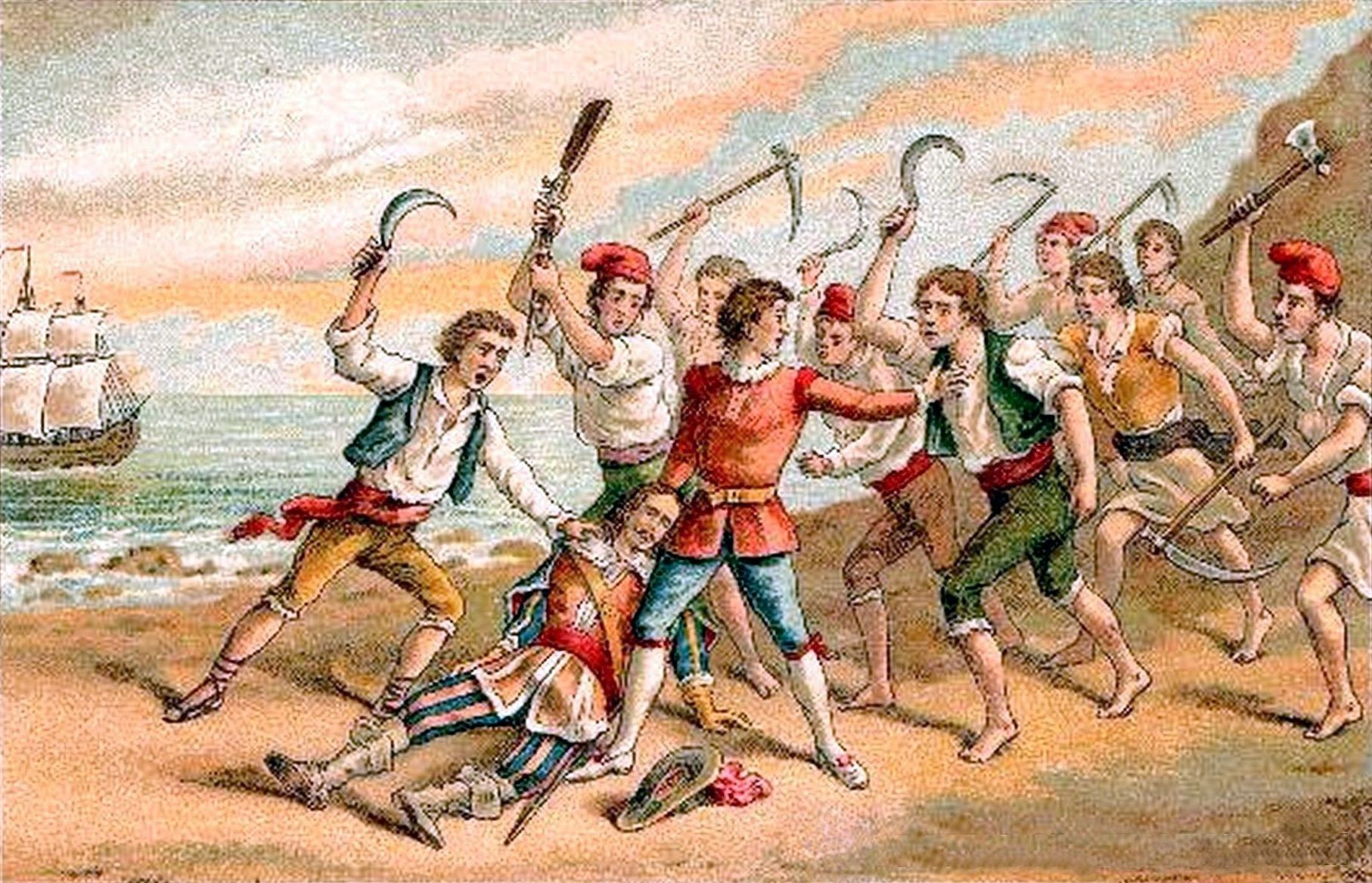
The Reapers' War "Corpus of Blood" by H. Miralles (1910)

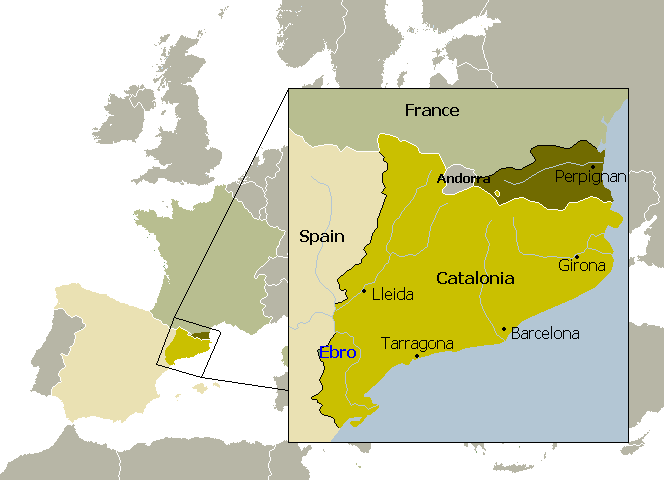
After the 1659 Treaty of the Pyrenees, the Roussillon (in ocher) became part of the Kingdom of France. The Principality of Catalonia south to the Pyrenees remained in the Spanish Crown

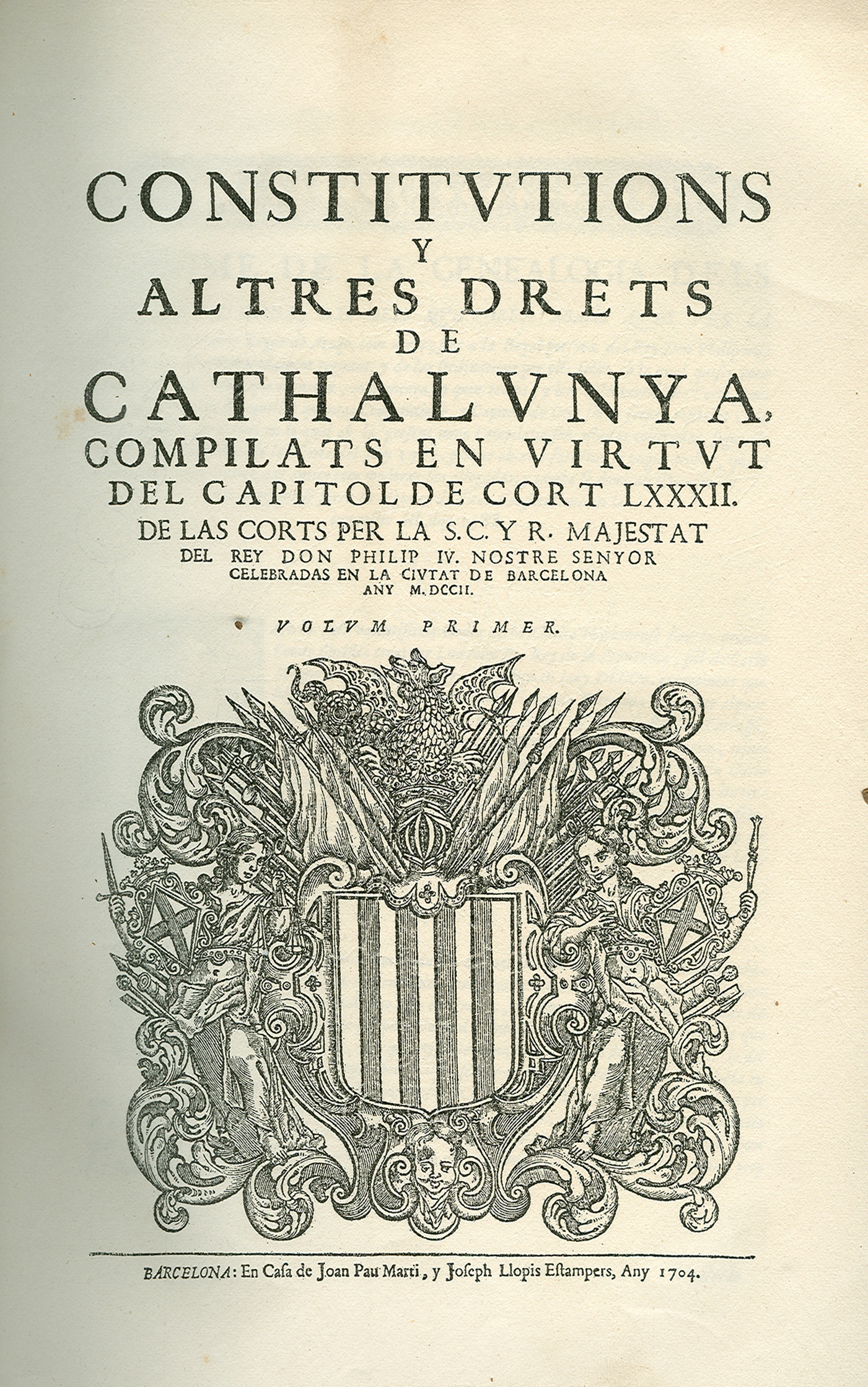
Catalan Constitutions (1704)

During the first centuries of the Reconquista, the Franks drove the Muslims south of the Pyrenees. To prevent future incursions, Charlemagne created in 790 CE a series of Frankish counties through the conquered territory (which was occasionally called "Marca Hispanica"), serving as buffer states between the Frankish kingdom and Al-Andalus.

Between 878 and 988 CE, the area became a hotbed of Frankish-Muslim conflict. However, as the Frankish monarchy and the Caliphate of Córdoba both weakened during the 11th century, the resulting impasse allowed for a process of consolidation throughout the region's many earldoms, resulting in their combination into the County of Barcelona, which became the embryo of today's Catalonia. By 1070, Ramon Berenguer I, Count of Barcelona, had subordinated other Catalan counts and intransigent nobles as vassals. His action brought peace to a turbulent feudal system and sowed the seeds of Catalan identity. Ramon Berenguer approved a series of pacts, called the Usatges, which "explicitly acknowledged legal equality between burghers ... and nobility".

According to several scholars, the term "Catalan" and "Catalonia" emerged near the end of the 11th century and appeared in the compiled Usatges of 1173. Two factors fostered this identity: stable institutions and cultural prosperity. While the temporary lack of foreign invasions contributed to Catalonia's stability, it was not a major cause. Rather, it provided a zone for sociopolitical development. For example, after the County of Barcelona signed an agreement with the Kingdom of Aragon in 1137 to create a dynastic union of both entities later known as Crown of Aragon, the system was designed to mutually check both the king's and the nobility's powers, while the small but growing numbers of free citizens and bourgeoisie would tactically take sides with the king in order to diminish typically feudal institutions. In 1173, Catalonia was legally delimited for the first time, while, apart from the compilation of the Usages, between 1170 and 1195 the Liber feudorum maior and the Gesta Comitum Barchinonensium were compiled and written, being considered together as the three milestones of Catalan political identity.

In addition, the estates of the realm established the Corts Catalanes (Catalan Courts), a representative body of nobles, bishops, abbots and the bourgeoisie that counterbalanced the King's authority. By the end of the 13th century, "the monarch needed the consent of the Corts to approve laws or collect revenue". Soon after, the Catalan Courts elected a standing body called the Diputació del General or the Generalitat, which included the rising upper bourgeoisie. The first Constitutions of Catalonia were promulgated by the Catalan Courts held in Barcelona in 1283, following the Roman tradition of the codex.

In the 13th century, King James I of Aragon conquered Valencia, and the Balearic Islands. Subsequent conquests expanded into the Mediterranean, reaching Sardinia, Corsica, Sicily, Naples, and Greece, so by 1350 the Crown of Aragon "presided over one of the most extensive and powerful mercantile empires of the Mediterranean during this period". Catalonia's economic success formed a powerful merchant class, which wielded the Corts as its political weapon. It also produced a smaller middle class, or menestralia, that was "composed of artisans, shopkeepers and workshop owners".

Over the 13th and 14th centuries, these merchants accrued so much wealth and political sway that they were able to place a significant check on the power of the Aragonese crown. By the 15th century the Aragonese monarch "was not considered legitimate until he had sworn to respect the basic law of the land in the presence of the Corts". This balance of power is a classic example of pactisme, or contractualism, which seems to be a defining feature of the Catalan political culture.

Along with political and economic success, Catalan culture flourished in the 13th and 14th centuries. During this period, the Catalan vernacular gradually replaced Latin as the language of culture and government. Scholars rewrote everything from ancient Visigothic law to religious sermons in Catalan. Wealthy citizens bolstered Catalan's literary appeal through poetry contests and history pageants dubbed the Jocs Florals, or "Floral Games." As the kingdom expanded southeast into Valencia and the Mediterranean, the Catalan language followed.

The medieval heyday of Catalan culture would not last, however. After a bout of famine and plague hit Catalonia in the mid-14th century, the population dropped from 500,000 to 200,000. This exacerbated feudal tensions, sparking serf revolts in rural areas and political impasses in Barcelona. Financial issues and the burden of multiple dependencies abroad further strained the region.

In 1410, the king died without leaving an heir to the throne. Finding no legitimate alternative, representatives of the three Iberian realms composing the Crown of Aragon (the kingdoms of Aragon and Valencia and the Principality of Catalonia) agreed by means of the Compromise of Caspe that the vacant throne should go to the Castilian Ferdinand I, as he was among the nearest relatives of the recently extinguished House of Barcelona through a maternal line. The new dynasty began to assert the authority of the Crown, leading to a perception among the nobility that their traditional privileges associated with their position in society were at risk. From 1458 to 1479, civil wars between King John II and Catalan institutions engulfed Catalonia.

During the conflict, John II, in the face of French aggression in the Pyrenees "had his heir Ferdinand married to Isabella I of Castile, the heiress to the Castilian throne, in a bid to find outside allies". Their dynastic union, which came to be known as the Catholic Monarchs, marked the de facto unification of the Monarchy of Spain. At that point, however, de jure both the Castile and the states of the Crown of Aragon remained distinct entities, each keeping its own separate jurisdictions, institutions, parliaments and legislation. This was a common practice at this time in Western Europe as the concept of sovereignty lay with the monarch.

With the dawn of the Age of Discovery, led by the Portuguese, the importance of the Aragonese possessions in the Mediterranean became drastically reduced and, alongside the rise of Barbary pirates predating commerce in the Mediterranean, the theatre of European power shifted from the Mediterranean basin to the Atlantic Ocean. These political and economic restrictions impacted all segments of society. Also, because of locally bred social conflicts, Catalonia squandered in one century most of what it had gained in political rights between 1070 and 1410.

Nevertheless, early political, economic and cultural advances gave Catalonia "a mode of organization and an awareness of its own identity which might in some ways be described as national, though the idea of popular or national sovereignty did not yet exist". Other scholars like Kenneth McRoberts and Katheryn Woolard hold similar views. Both support Pierre Vilar, who contends that in 13th and 14th centuries "the Catalan principality was perhaps the European country to which it would be the least inexact or risky to use such seemingly anachronistic terms as political and economic imperialism or 'nation-state'". In other words, an array of political and cultural forces laid the foundations of Catalan "national" identity.

Llobera agrees with this opinion, saying, "By the mid-thirteenth century, the first solid manifestations of national consciousness can be observed." Indeed, 13th- and 14th-century Catalonia did exhibit features of a nation-state. The role of Catalan Counts, the Corts, Mediterranean rule and economic prosperity support this thesis. But as Vilar points out, these analogies are only true if we acknowledge that a 14th-century nation-state is anachronistic. In other words, those living in Catalonia before latter day nationalism possessed a collective identity on which this was to be based, but this does not automatically equate to the modern concept of nation, neither in Catalonia nor elsewhere in similar circumstances during the Middle Ages.

The Catalan Courts and the rest of the autochthonous legal and political organization of the Principality of Catalonia were finally terminated in 1716, as a result of the War of the Spanish Succession. The Catalan institutions and most of local population took sides and provided troops and resources for Archduke Charles, the pretender, who was expected to maintain and modernize the legal status quo. His utter defeat meant the legal and political termination of the autonomous parliaments in the Crown of Aragon, as the Nueva Planta decrees were passed and King Philip V of Spain of the new House of Bourbon sealed the transformation of Spain from a de facto unified realm into a de jure centralized state.

== Development of modern Catalanism ==
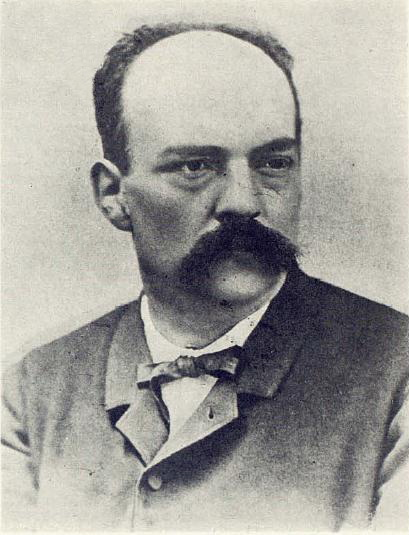
Valentí Almirall

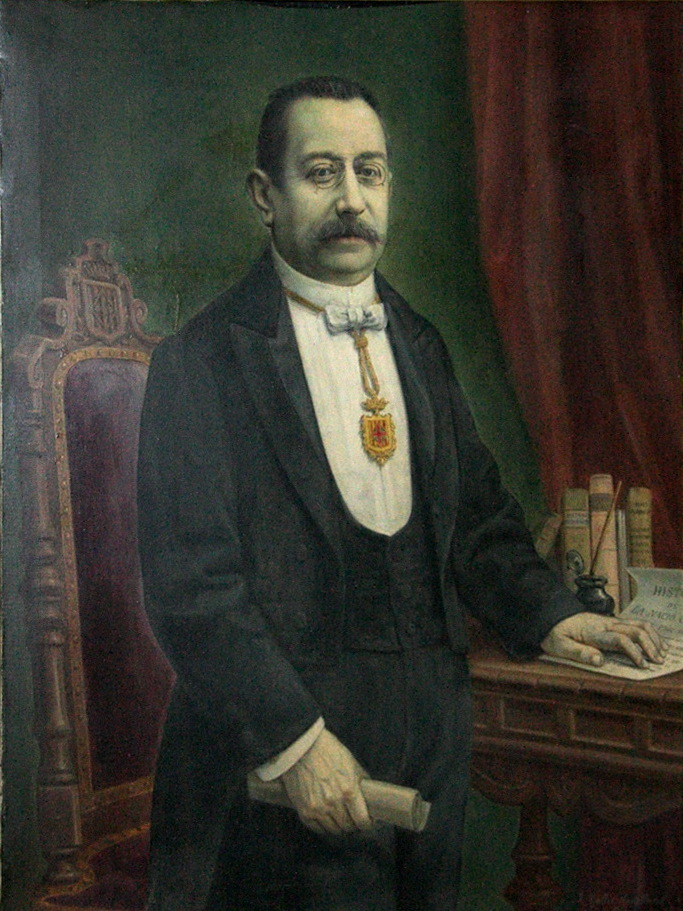
Enric Prat de la Riba

The Renaixença ("rebirth" or "renaissance") was a cultural, historical and literary movement that pursued, in the wake of European Romanticism, the recovery of the Catalans' own language and literature after a century of repression and radical political and economical changes. As time went by, and particularly immediately after the fiasco of the Revolution of 1868 (led by the Catalan general Joan Prim) and the subsequent fail of the First Spanish Republic (1873–1874), which many Catalans expected an instauration of a federal republic, the movement acquired a clear political character, directed to the attainment of self-government for Catalonia within the framework of the Spanish liberal state.

Like most Romantic currents, the Renaixença gave historical analysis a central role. History, in fact, was an integral part of Catalonia's "rebirth." Texts on Catalonia's history — inspired by the Romantic philosophy of history — laid the foundations of a Catalanist movement. Works like Valentí Almirall i Llozer's Lo Catalanisme, Victor Balaguer's Historia de Cataluña y de la Corona de Aragón and Prat de la Riba's La nacionalitat catalana used history as evidence for Catalonia's nationhood. According to Elie Kedourie, such claims were common in 19th century nationalist discourse because "the 'past' is used to explain the 'present,' to give it meaning and legitimacy. The 'past' reveals one's identity, and history determines one's role in the drama of human development and progress". Publications of histories thus "explained" why the Catalans constituted a nation instead of a Spanish region or coastal province.

At the heart of many of the works of the Renaixença lay a powerful idea: the Volk. Indeed, the concept of Volk played a vital role in mainstream Catalan Romantic nationalism. It has its origins in the writings of German Romantics like Friedrich Carl von Savigny, Georg Wilhelm Friedrich Hegel and, most notably, Johann Gottfried Herder.

The concept of Volk entered Catalan intellectual circles in the 1830s, stemming from the emphasis on the region's medieval history and philology. It first appeared in the writings of Juan Cortada (1805–1868), Marti d'Eixalà (1807–1857) and his disciple, Francesco Javier Llorens y Barba, intellectuals who reinvigorated the literature on the Catalan national character. Inspired by the ideas of Herder, Savigny and the entire Scottish School of Common Sense, they asked why the Catalans were different from other Spaniards — especially the Castilians. For example, Cortada wanted to determine why, despite its poor natural environment, Catalonia was so much more successful economically than other parts of Spain. In a series of generalizations, he concluded that the "Catalans have succeeded in developing a strong sense of resolution and constancy over the centuries. Another feature of their character was the fact that they were hardworking people". D'Eixalà and Llorens held a similar understanding of the Catalan national character. They held that two characteristics particular to Catalans were common sense (seny) and industriousness. To them, "the traditional Catalan seny was a manifestation of the Volksgeist", one which made Catalans essentially different from Castilians.

The early works on the Catalan Volk would remain on paper long before they entered politics. This is because the Catalan bourgeoisie had not yet abandoned the hope of spearheading the Spanish state. Indeed, in the 1830s, the Renaixença was still embryonic and the industrial class still thought that it could at least control the Spanish economy. Notions of Catalonia's uniqueness mattered little to a group that believed it could integrate and lead the entire country. But this all changed around 1880. After decades of discrimination from Spanish elites, Catalan industrialists buried their dream of leading Spain. As Vilar observes: "It is only because, in its acquisition of the Spanish market, the Catalan industrial bourgeoisie did not succeed either in securing the state apparatus or identifying its interests with those of the whole of Spain, in influential opinion, that Catalonia, this little "fatherland", finally became the 'national' focal point".

This switch of allegiance was particularly easy because the idea of a Catalan nation had already matured into a corpus of texts about the region's "uniqueness" and Volksgeist. Inspired by these works of Romantic nationalism, the Catalan economic elite became conscious of "the growing dissimilitude between the Catalonia's social structure and that of the rest of the nation". Consequently, Romantic nationalism expanded beyond its philosophical bounds into the political arena.

Nonetheless, this idea lost its importance, and even were abandoned by many sectors (specially from the left-wing Catalanism) during the last years of the 19th century and the first third of the 20th century, thanks to the contact with the ideas of Ernest Renan and its civic and republican concept of nation. Antoni Rovira i Virgili (1882–1949), Catalan nationalist and republican historian and politician, gave support to these ideas.

In the last third of the 19th century, Catalanism was formulating its own doctrinal foundations, not only among the progressive ranks but also amongst the conservatives. At the same time it started to establish its first political programmes (e.g. Memorial of Wrongs Bases de Manresa, 1892), and to generate a wide cultural and association movement of a clearly nationalistic character.

In 1898, Spain lost its last colonial possessions in Cuba and the Philippines, a fact that not only created an important crisis of national confidence, but also gave an impulse to political Catalanism. The first modern political party in Catalonia was the Lliga Regionalista. Founded in 1901, it formed a coalition in 1907 with other Catalanist forces (from Carlism to Federalists), grouped in the so-called Solidaritat Catalana, and won the elections with the regionalist programme that Enric Prat de la Riba had formulated in his manifesto La nacionalitat catalana (1906).

=== Industrialization and Catalanism ===
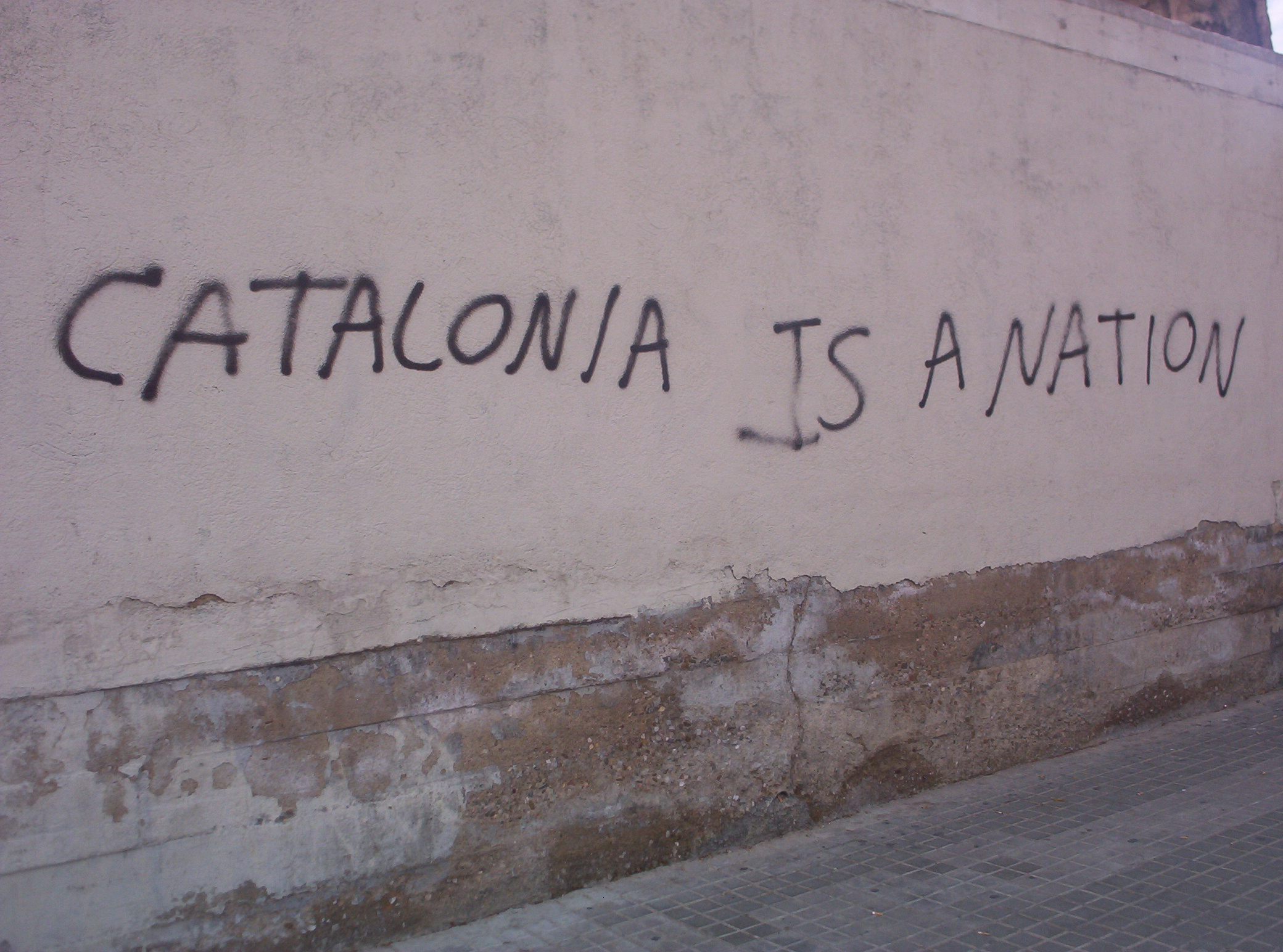
Nationalist graffiti in Catalonia

The 18th-century Spanish economy depended mostly on agriculture. The social structure stayed hierarchical, if not feudal, while the Catholic Church and Bourbon monarchs wrestled for internal supremacy. Into the 19th century, the Napoleonic invasion devastated the country and its early attempts in industrialization and led to chronic political instability, with Spain remaining politically and culturally isolated from the rest of Europe.

Unlike in the rest of Spain, the Industrial Revolution made some progress in Catalonia, whose pro-industry middle class strove to mechanize everything, from textiles and crafts to wineries. Industrialization and trade went hand in hand with the proto-nationalist Renaixença cultural movement, which, annoyed with the shortcomings of the Royal court in Madrid, began to fashion an alternative, and that was Catalan identity.

To finance their cultural project, a locally bred proto-nationalist intelligentsia sought patronage and protection from Barcelona's industrial barons. This relationship played a decisive role in the development of Catalanism. On the one hand, intellectuals sought to renew Catalan identity as a response to Spain's overall backwardness. They wanted to distance themselves from the Spanish problems by creating a new ontology rooted in Catalan culture, language and world view. On the other hand, those same intellectuals avoided demands for separation. They knew that their patrons would want Catalan nationalism to include Spain for two reasons:

- Any secession from Spain would devastate industrial markets and impoverish the region.
- The Catalan industrial class was "unconditionally pro-Spanish at heart".

As Woolard notes, the economic interests in Madrid and the budding Catalan industrialists converged during the 18th century, resulting in cooperation. For the nationalist literati, this meant that Catalanism could promote a national identity, but it had to function within Spain.

Furthermore, Barcelona's industrial elite wanted Catalonia to stay part of Spain since Catalonia's industrial markets relied on consumption from other Spanish regions which, little by little, started to join some sort of development. In fact, part of the industrialists' desire to remain part of Spain was their desire for protectionism, hegemony in domestic markets and the push to "influence Madrid's political choices by intervening in central Spanish affairs". Thus, it made no economic sense to promote any secession from Spain. On the contrary, Catalonia's prominent industrialists acted as the Spanish leading economic heads. As Stanley Payne observes: "The modern Catalan élite had played a major role in what there was of economic industrialization in the nineteenth century, and had tended to view Catalonia not as the antagonist but to some degree the leader of a freer, more prosperous Spain". Barcelona's bourgeois industrialists even claimed that protectionism and leadership served the interests of the "'national market' or of 'developing the national economy' (national meaning Spanish here)". The inclusion of Spain was instrumental to Catalonia's success, meaning that industrialists would not tolerate any secessionist movement. Claiming that independence would have assured nothing but weak markets, an internal enemy and strengthened anarchist movements. And hence, though manufacturers funded the Renaixença—and Catalan nationalism—they demanded that Catalonia stayed part of Spain to ensure economic stability.

This federalist-like lobbying had not worked at first, nor did it succeed until the late 1880s. Finally, in 1889, the pro-industrialist Lliga Regionalista managed to save the particular Catalan Civil Code, after a liberal attempt to homogenize the Spanish legal structures. Two years later, they coaxed Madrid into passing protectionist measures, which reinvigorated pro-Spanish attitudes among manufacturers. Then, they also took great profits from Spain's neutrality in World War I, which allowed them to export to both sides, and the Spanish expansion in Morocco, which Catalan industrialists encouraged, since it was to become a fast growing market for them. Also, by the early 20th century, Catalan businessmen had managed to gain control of the most profitable commerce between Spain and its American colonies and ex-colonies, namely Cuba and Puerto Rico.

This nationalist-industrialist accord is a classic example of inclusionary Catalanism. Nationalists might have hoped for an independent Catalonia but their patrons needed access to markets and protectionism. As a result, nationalists could propagate the Catalan identity provided that it coincided with the industrialists' pro-Spanish stance. Because the Lliga Regionalista de Catalunya endorsed this compromise, it dominated Catalan politics after the start of the 20th century. Payne notes: "The main Catalanist party, the bourgeois Lliga, never sought separatism but rather a more discrete and distinctive place for a self-governing Catalonia within a more reformist and progressive Spain. The Lliga's leaders ran their 1916 electoral campaign under the slogan Per l'Espanya Gran (For the Great Spain)". The Lliga had tempered the nationalist position to one of inclusionary nationalism. It allowed Catalanism to flourish, but demanded that it promote federalism within Spain, and not separation from it. Any deviation from this delicate balance would have enraged those pro-Catalan and Spanish-identifying industrialists. Ultimately, this prevented any moves towards separation while strengthening Catalonia's "federal" rights after the Commonwealth of Catalonia took power in 1914.

=== Catalanism in the 20th century ===
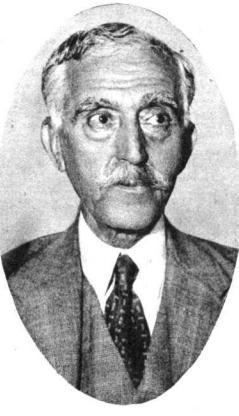
Francesc Macià, republican and left-wing independentist leader, first president of the Generalitat of Catalonia (1931–1933)

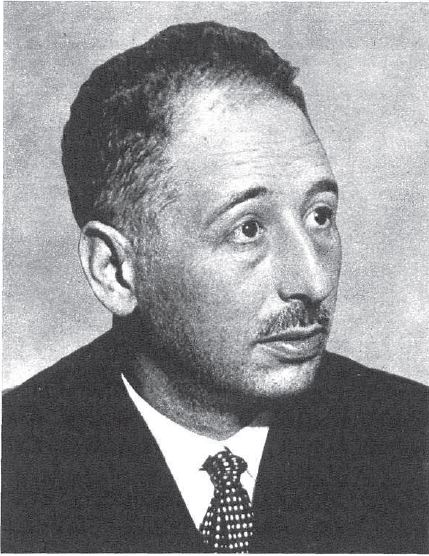
Lluís Companys, left-wing Catalan nationalist leader and second president of Catalonia (1933-1940), executed by Franco's Dictatorship in 1940

During the first part of the 20th century, the main nationalist party was the conservative Lliga Regionalista, headed by Francesc Cambó. For the nationalists, the main achievement in this period was the Commonwealth of Catalonia, a grouping of the four Catalan provinces with limited administrative power. The Commonwealth developed an important infrastructure (like roads and phones) and promoted the culture (professional education, libraries, regulation of Catalan language, study of sciences) in order to modernize Catalonia. The failure in being granted an Estatute of autonomy in 1919 within the Restoration regime, led to radicalisation of the moderate nationalist parties in Catalonia, leading in turn to the creation of Acció Catalana (Catalan Action) and also Estat Català (Catalan State), drifting apart from the Lliga. Among the leaders of Acció Catalana founded in 1922 and chiefly supportive of liberal-democratic catalanism and a catalanisation process were Jaume Bofill, Antoni Rovira i Virgili and Lluís Nicolau d'Olwer. It also featured an internal elitist faction, moved by the thinking of Charles Maurras and Action française of which Josep Vicenç Foix and Josep Carbonell were representatives, while Jaume Bofill was ambivalent to the extreme right French thinker. Estat Català, somewhat more attached to the idea of downright independence, was founded right after the creation of Acció Catalana by Francesc Macià.

The Mancomunitat of Catalonia was dissolved during the dictatorship of Miguel Primo de Rivera in 1925. The anti-Catalan measures taken by dictator Primo de Rivera led to further disappointment among Catalan conservatives, who initially trusted in him because of an earlier support of regionalism prior to his pronunciamiento in September 1923, and also further exacerbation of insurrectionary nationalists. In November 1926 Macià helmed an attempt of military invasion of Catalonia from France which would purposely lead to a civil uprising and the proclamation of the Catalan Republic; he was not able even to get past through the border.

In 1931, the left-wing Catalan nationalist Esquerra Republicana de Catalunya (Republican Left of Catalonia, ERC) party, born as a result of the fusion of Catalan Republican Party and Estat Català, won the elections in Catalonia, advocating a Catalan Republic federated with Spain the same day of the proclamation of the Second Spanish Republic. Under pressure from the new Spanish government, the leader of ERC, Francesc Macià, accepted an autonomous Catalan government instead, which recovered the historical name of Generalitat de Catalunya.

The Catalan Government broke with the Republican legality in the events of October 1934, when Lluís Companys, under the influence of the JEREC, rebelled against the Spanish government.

A dramatically short period of restoration of democratic and cultural normality was interrupted at its outset by the outbreak of the Spanish Civil War. The autonomous government, which was loyal to the Republic during the 1936–1939 war period, was abolished in 1939, after the victory of the Francoist troops. During the last stages of the war, when the Republican side was on the verge of defeat, Catalan president of the Generalitat, Lluís Companys, rhetorically declared Catalan independence, even though it never materialized due to objections within Catalonia and, eventually, by the defeat of the Second Spanish Republic.

Right after the war, Companys, along with thousands of Spanish Republicans, sought cover in France exiled but because of the, by that time, mutual sympathy between Franco's government and Nazi Germany, he was captured after the Fall of France in 1940 and handed to Spanish authorities, who tortured him and which sentenced him to death for 'military rebellion'. He was executed at Montjuïc in Barcelona at 6.30 a.m. on October 15, 1940. Refusing to wear a blindfold, he was taken before a firing squad of Civil Guards and, as they fired, he cried 'Per Catalunya!'.

Several political or cultural Catalan movements operated underground during the dictatorship of Francisco Franco, which lasted until 1975. A president of the Catalan government was still designated, and operated symbolically in exile.

Companys's successor in exile, Josep Tarradellas, kept away from Spain until Franco's death in 1975. When he came back in 1977, the government of Catalonia -the Generalitat- was restored again. Following the approval of the Spanish constitution in 1978, a Statute of Autonomy was promulgated and approved in referendum. Catalonia was organized as an Autonomous Community, and in 1980, Jordi Pujol, from the conservative nationalist party Convergència Democràtica de Catalunya, was elected president and ruled the autonomous government for 23 consecutive years.

In contrast, there is no significant political autonomy, nor recognition of the language in the historical Catalan territories belonging to France (Roussillon, in the French département of Pyrénées-Orientales).

=== Referendum and political developments since 2006 ===
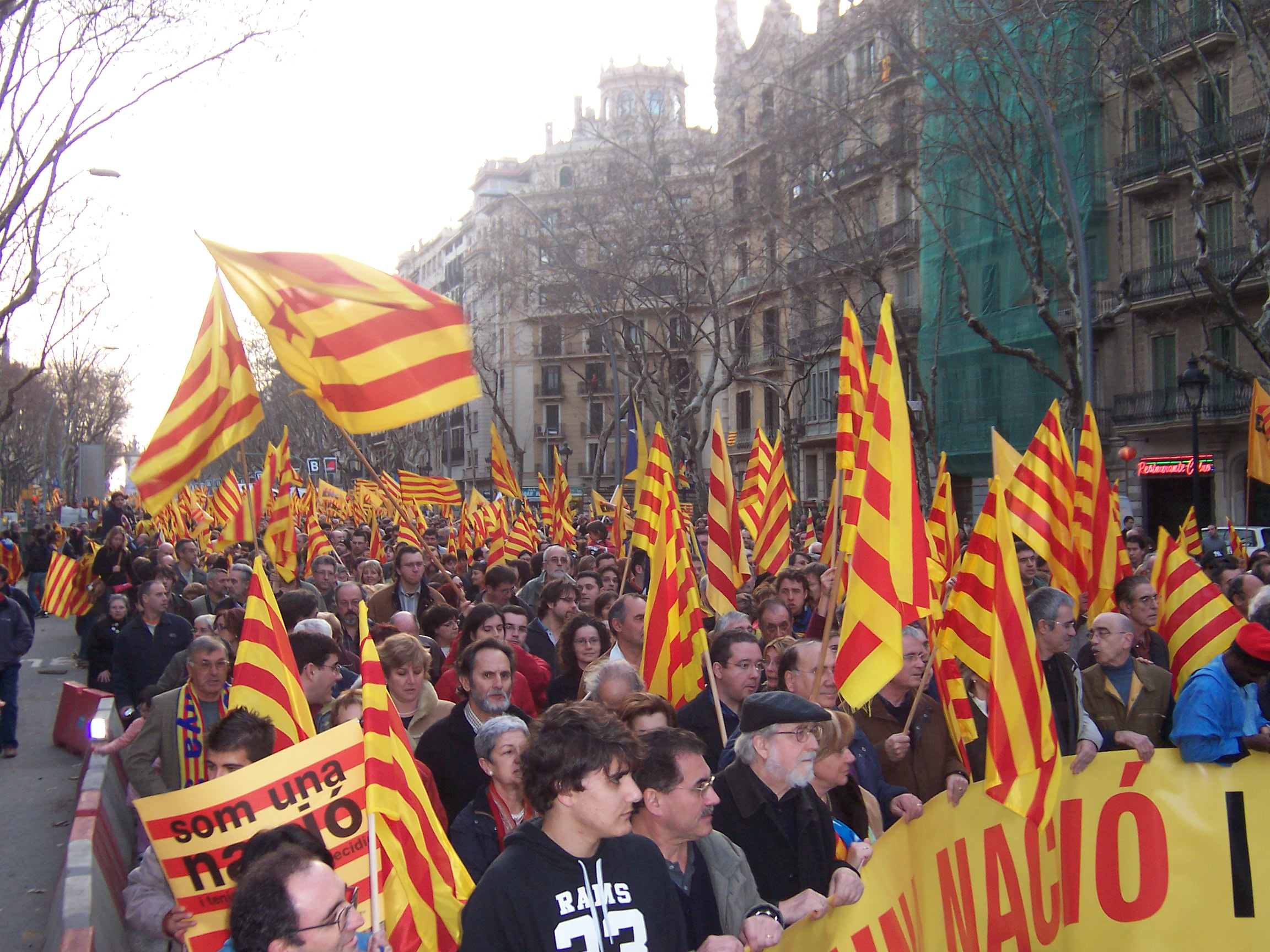
Catalan Nationalist demonstration celebrated in Barcelona on 18 February 2006

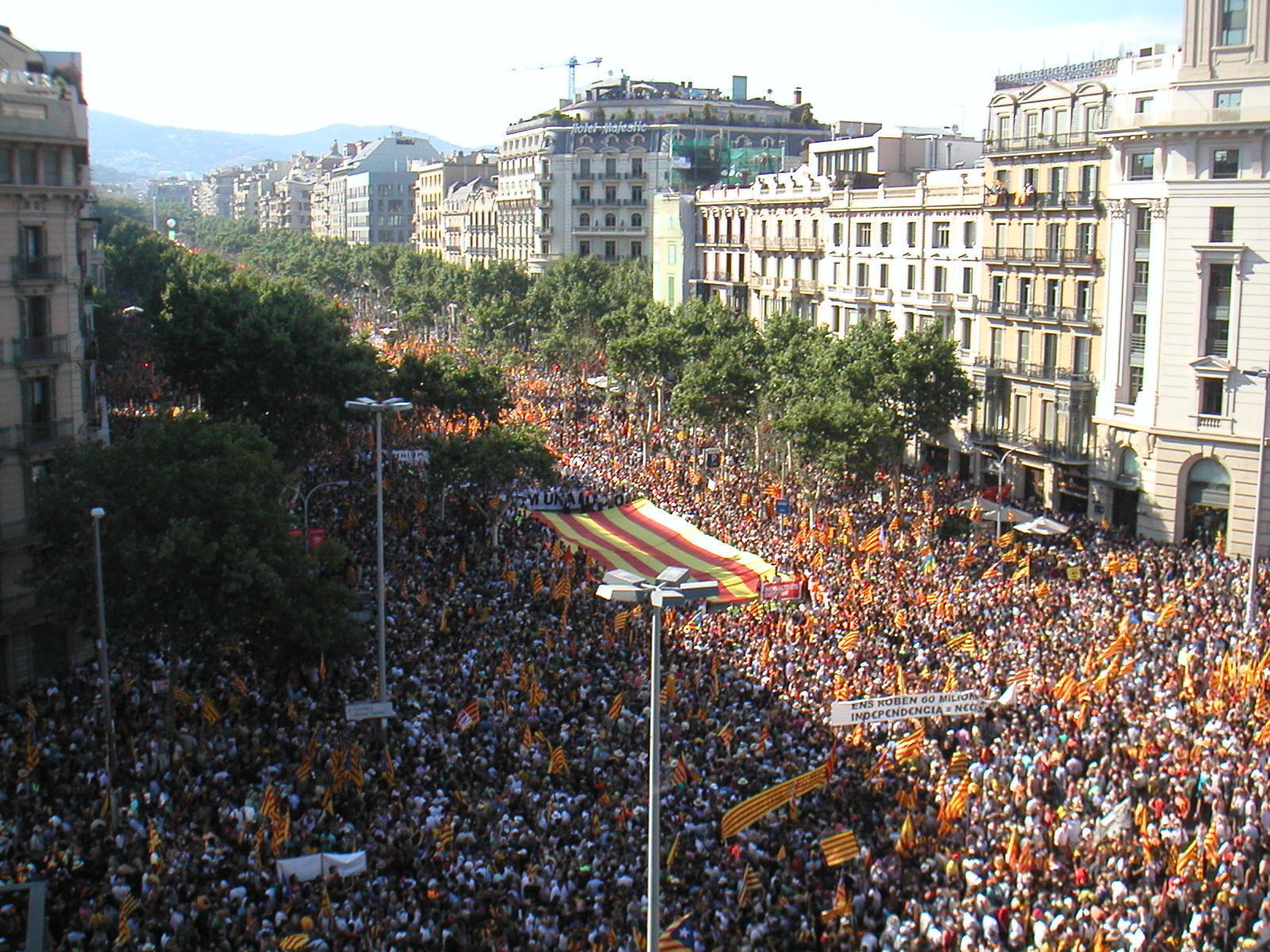
View of the demonstration on 10 July 2010 (Barcelona) to reject the ruling that the Constitutional Court of Spain had about Statute of Autonomy (2006) and in favor of the right to decide.

Currently, the main political parties which define themselves as being Catalan nationalists are Convergència Democràtica de Catalunya, Unió Democràtica de Catalunya. The Esquerra Republicana de Catalunya, although deriving from nationalism, refuses the term "nationalism" and prefers to describe itself as pro-independence; so does Solidaritat Catalana. These parties obtained 50.03% of the votes in the 2010 election. Within these parties, there is much divergence of opinion. More radical elements are only content with the establishment of a separate Catalan state. In contrast, more moderate elements do not necessarily identify with the belief that protection of Catalan identity is incompatible within Spain. Others vote for these parties simply as a protest and do not necessarily identify with the overall party platform (for example, some people may vote for ERC because they are simply tired of CiU, even though they do not actually desire a leftist Catalan republic). The other way around also occurs: some voters may vote for non-nationalist parties (especially the Initiative for Catalonia Greens, ICV, and the Socialists' Party of Catalonia, PSC) for reasons of policy, ideology or personal preference, although they share a nationalist viewpoint regarding Catalonia's status within Spain. Some polls, conducted in 2010, show that more than a third of PSC and more than half of ICV voters support Catalonia's independence (in the latter case, the percentage is even higher than among Convergence and Union voters); according to these polls, even 15% of the pro-Spanish Partido Popular voters in Catalonia support the region's independence.

Two commonly seen variants of the Estelada, the pro-independence flag

In 2006, a referendum was held on amending the Statute of Autonomy of Catalonia of 1979 to further expand the authority of the Catalan government. It was approved by 73.24% of the voters or 35.78% of the census, and became effective as of August 9, 2006. However, the turnout of 48.84% represented an unprecedented high abstention in Catalonia's democratic history. This has been cited both as a symptom of having large sectors in the average populace disengaged or at odds with the politics of identity in Catalonia, and, alternatively, as a symptom of fatigue among Catalan nationalists who would like to see bolder steps towards political autonomy or independence. In this regard, both Esquerra Republicana de Catalunya (Catalan pro-independence left wing) and Partido Popular (Spanish right wing) campaigned against having the 2006 Statute of Autonomy passed: the former considered it too little, the latter too much.

On September 11, 2012 between 600,000 (according to Spanish Government Delegation in Barcelona) and 2 million (according to the organisers) people gathered in central Barcelona calling for independence from Spain. In September and October, numerous Catalan municipalities declared themselves to be Free Catalan Territory.

On September 11, 2013 the Catalan Way took place, consisting of a 480-kilometre (300 mi) human chain with 1.6 million people in support of Catalan independence.

Following the economic crisis of 2008, the government of Artur Mas moved away from its former regionalist position and came to overtly support Catalan independence. The Catalan government held a non-binding popular consultation on the subject in 2014. Catalan nationalists polled well in the 2015 election to the Catalan parliament, which Artur Mas declared to be a referendum-election.

In the 2017 Catalan regional election the nationalist parties that support the creation of an independent state (JuntsxCat, ERC and CUP) obtained a plurality of seats, but a minority of votes with less than 50%. The most voted party remained the non-nationalist Citizens (Cs).

=== 2017 referendum, Declaration of Independence and new regional elections ===
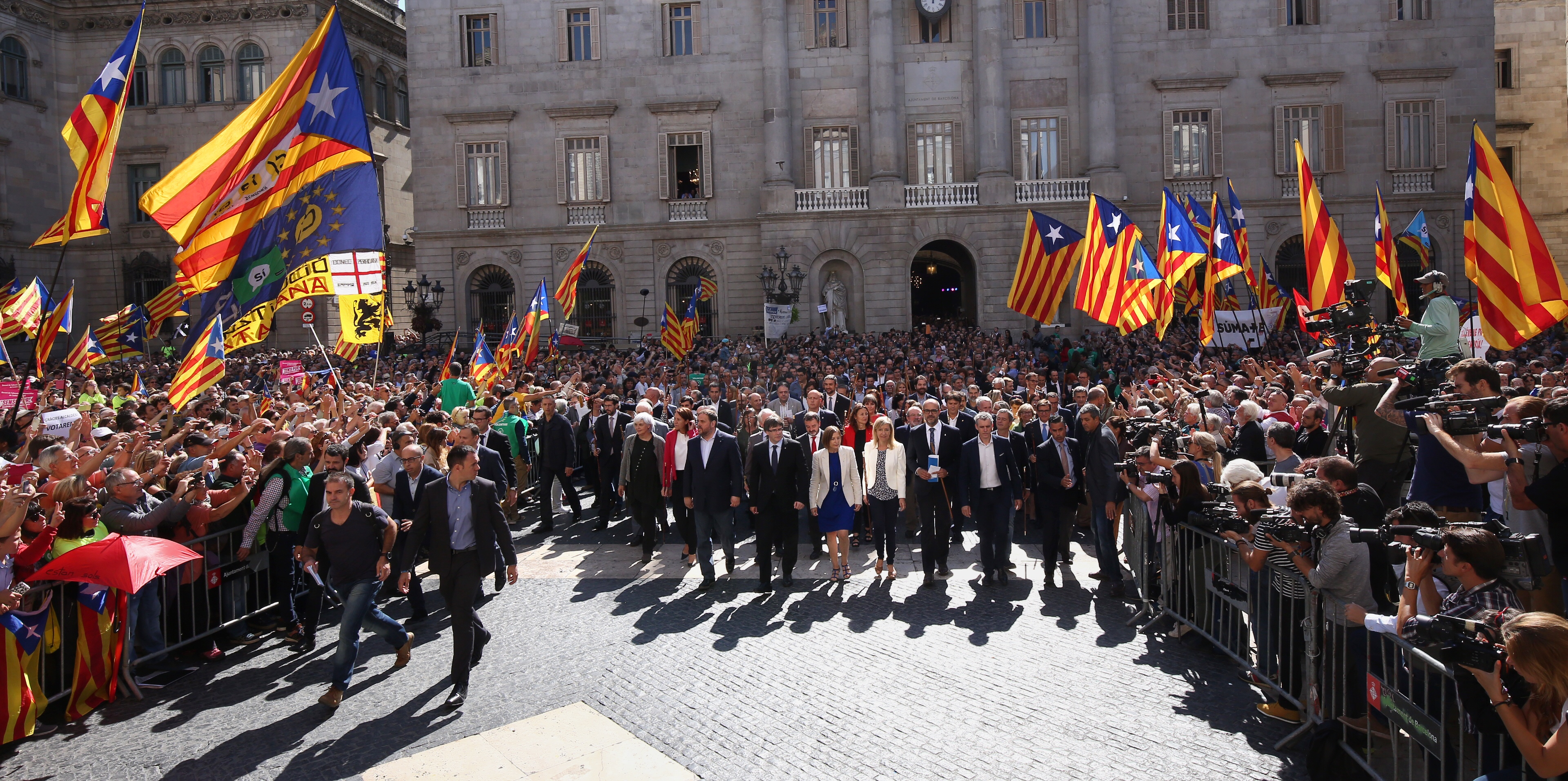
Catalan President Carles Puigdemont and more than 700 mayors from Catalonia met to show support for holding an independence referendum.

In late September 2016, Puigdemont told the parliament that a binding referendum on independence would be held in the second half of September 2017, with or without the consent of the Spanish institutions. Puigdemont announced in June 2017 that the referendum would take place on 1 October, and that the question would be, "Do you want Catalonia to become an independent state in the form of a republic?" The Spanish government said in response, "that referendum will not take place because it is illegal."

A law creating an independent republic—in the event that the referendum took place and there was a majority "yes" vote, without requiring a minimum turnout—was approved by the Catalan parliament in a session on 6 September 2017. Opposition parties protested against the bill, calling it "a blow to democracy and a violation of the rights of the opposition", and staged a walkout before the vote was taken. On 7 September, the Catalan parliament passed a "transition law", to provide a legal framework pending the adoption of a new constitution, after similar protests and another walkout by opposition parties. The same day, 7 September, the Spanish Constitutional Court suspended the 6 September law while it considered an appeal from Mariano Rajoy, seeking a declaration that it was in breach of the Spanish constitution, meaning that the referendum could not legally go ahead on 1 October. The law was finally declared void on 17 October and is also illegal according to the Catalan Statutes of Autonomy which require a two-thirds majority in the Catalan parliament for any change to Catalonia's status.

The national government seized ballot papers and cell phones, threatened to fine people who staffed the polling stations up to €300,000, shut down web sites, and demanded that Google remove a voting location finder from the Android app store. Police were sent from the rest of Spain to suppress the vote and close polling locations, but parents scheduled events at schools (where polling places are located) over the weekend and vowed to occupy them to keep them open during the vote. Some election organizers were arrested, including Catalan cabinet officials, while demonstrations by local institutions and street protests grew larger.

The referendum took place on 1 October 2017, despite being suspended by the Constitutional Court, and despite the action of Spanish police to prevent voting in some centres. According to the Catalan authorities, 90% of voters supported independence, but turnout was only 43%, and there were reports of irregularities. On 10 October 2017, in the aftermath of the referendum, the President of the Generalitat of Catalonia, Carles Puigdemont, declared the independence of Catalonia but left it suspended. Puigdemont said during his appearance in the Catalan parliament that he assumes, in presenting the results of the referendum, "the people's mandate for Catalonia to become an independent state in the form of a republic", but proposed that in the following weeks the parliament "suspends the effect of the declaration of independence to engage in a dialogue to reach an agreed solution" with the Spanish Government.

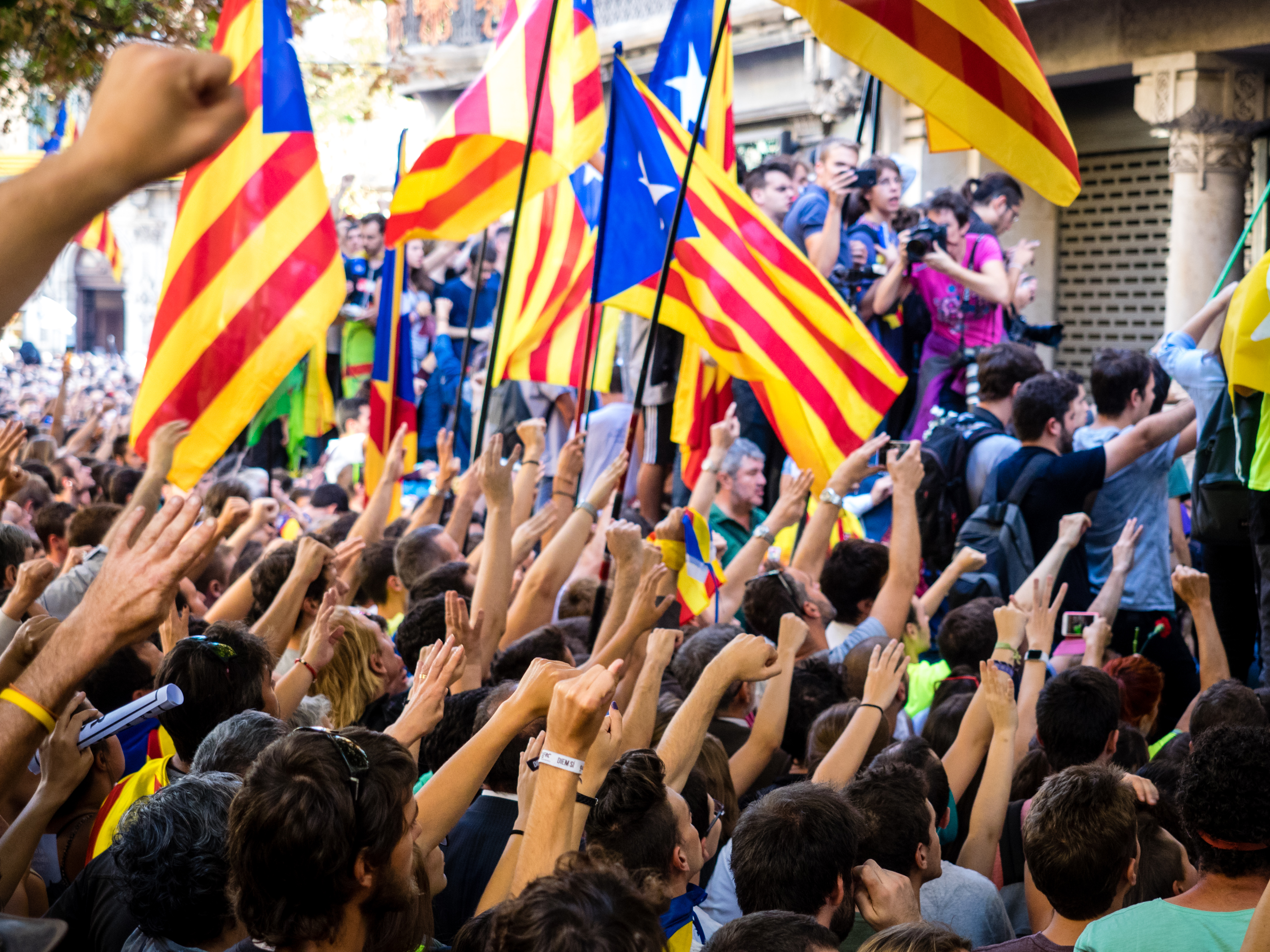
Protests in Barcelona after Spanish police raided Catalan government buildings, 20 September 2017

On 27 October 2017 the Catalan Parliament voted in a secret ballot to approve a resolution declaring independence from Spain by a vote of 70–10 in the absence of the constitutionalist deputies, who refused to participate in a vote considered illegal for violating the decisions of the Constitutional Court of Spain. As a result, article 155 of the Spanish constitution was triggered, the Catalan government was dismissed and direct rule was imposed from the central government in Madrid. Under direct rule from Spain, elections were held in Catalonia on 21 December 2017. The three pro-independence parties retained their control of parliament with a reduced majority of 70 seats and a combined 47.5% of valid votes cast. Inés Arrimadas' anti-independence Ciudadanos party was the most voted party with 25.4% of votes, the first time in Catalan history that a non-nationalist party won most votes and seats in an election. Parties which endorsed the suspension of autonomy by central government represented 43.5% of votes cast and parties which did not include independence in their electoral program amounted to 52.5% of the vote, notably Catcomu-Podem (7.5% of votes and 8 seats), which is opposed to independence but supports a legal referendum and denounced the suspension of autonomy. The excellent performance of the centre-right parties on both sides of the independence debate, Ciudadanos and Juntxcat, and the underperformance of all other parties (notably, left wing parties and the Partido Popular) were the most significant factor in this election result.

The 2017 Catalan independence referendum, also known by the numeronym 1-O (for "1 October") in Spanish media, was an independence referendum held on 1 October 2017 in the Spanish autonomous community of Catalonia, passed by the Parliament of Catalonia as the Law on the Referendum on Self-determination of Catalonia and called by the Generalitat de Catalunya. It was declared illegal on 7 September 2017 and suspended by the Constitutional Court of Spain after a request from the Spanish government, who declared it a breach of the Spanish Constitution. Additionally, in early September the High Court of Justice of Catalonia had issued orders to the police to try to prevent it, including the detention of various persons responsible for its preparation. Due to alleged irregularities during the voting process as well as to the use of force by the National Police and Civil Guard, international observers invited by the Generalitat declared that the referendum failed to meet the minimum international standards for elections.

The referendum was approved by the Catalan parliament in a session on 6 September 2017 along with the Law of juridical transition and foundation of the Republic of Catalonia the following day 7 of September, which stated that independence would be binding with a simple majority, without requiring a minimum turnout. After being suspended, the law was finally declared void on 17 October, being also illegal according to the Statute of Autonomy of Catalonia which requires a two-thirds majority, 90 seats, in the Catalan parliament for any change to Catalonia's status.

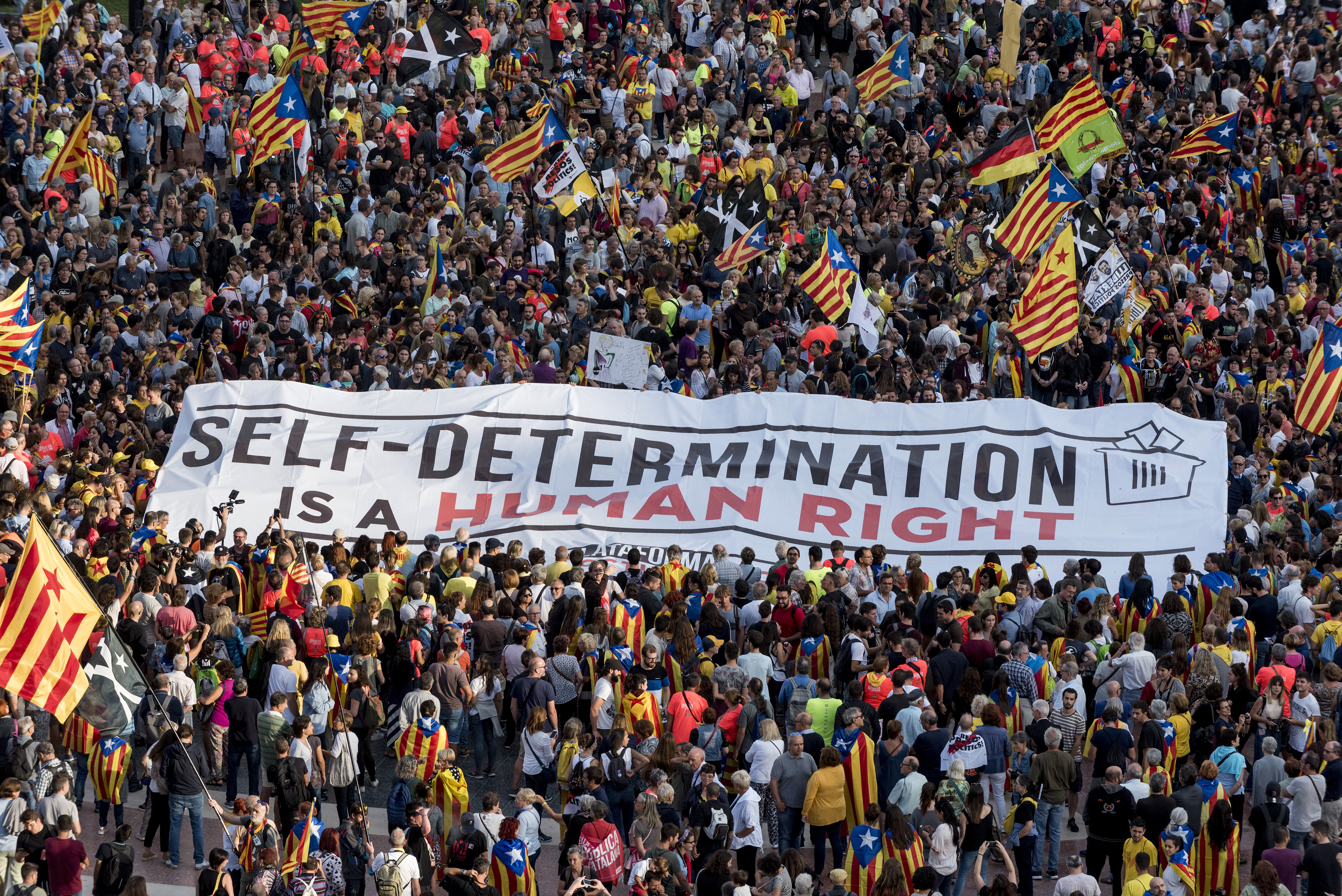
Protest in Barcelona on 1 October 2018

The referendum question, which voters answered with "Yes" or "No", was "Do you want Catalonia to become an independent state in the form of a republic?". The "Yes" side won, with 2,044,038 (92.01%) voting for independence and 177,547 (7.99%) voting against, on a turnout of 43.03%. The Catalan government estimated that up to 770,000 votes were not cast due to polling stations being closed off during the police crackdown, although the "universal census" system introduced earlier in the day allowed electors to vote at any given polling station. Catalan government officials have argued that the turnout would have been higher were it not for Spanish and Catalan police suppression of the vote. On the other hand, many voters who did not support Catalan independence did not turn out, as the constitutional political parties asked citizens not to participate in what they considered an illegal referendum.

On the day of the referendum, the inaction of part of the autonomous police force of Catalonia, the Mossos d'Esquadra, allowed many polling stations to open. The Spanish National Police Corps and the Guardia Civil intervened and raided several polling stations after they opened. 893 civilians and 111 agents of the National Police and the Guardia Civil were reported to have been injured. According to various sources these previously reported figures may have been exaggerated. According to the judge from Barcelona who is currently investigating the accusations of police violence, there were 218 persons injured on that day in the city of Barcelona alone, 20 of whom were agents. According to the official final report by the Catalan Health Service (CatSalut) of the Generalitat 1066 civilians, 11 agents of the National Police and the Guardia Civil and 1 agent of the regional police, the Mossos d'Esquadra, were injured. The United Nations High Commissioner for Human Rights, Zeid Ra'ad Al, urged the Spanish government to probe all acts of violence that took place to prevent the referendum. The police action also got criticism from Amnesty International and Human Rights Watch which defined it as an "excessive and unnecessary use of force". Spanish Supreme Court judge Pablo Llarena stated Puigdemont ignored the repeated warnings he received about the escalation of violence if the referendum was held.

Mossos d'Esquadra are being investigated for disobedience, for allegedly not having complied with the orders of the High Court of Justice of Catalonia to prevent the referendum. Including Josep Lluís Trapero Álvarez, the Mossos d'Esquadra Major, who is being investigated for sedition by the Spanish National Court. Mossos d'Esquadra, deny those accusations and allege they obeyed the orders but applying the principle of proportionality, which is required by Spanish law in all police.

== Forms of contemporary Catalan nationalism ==
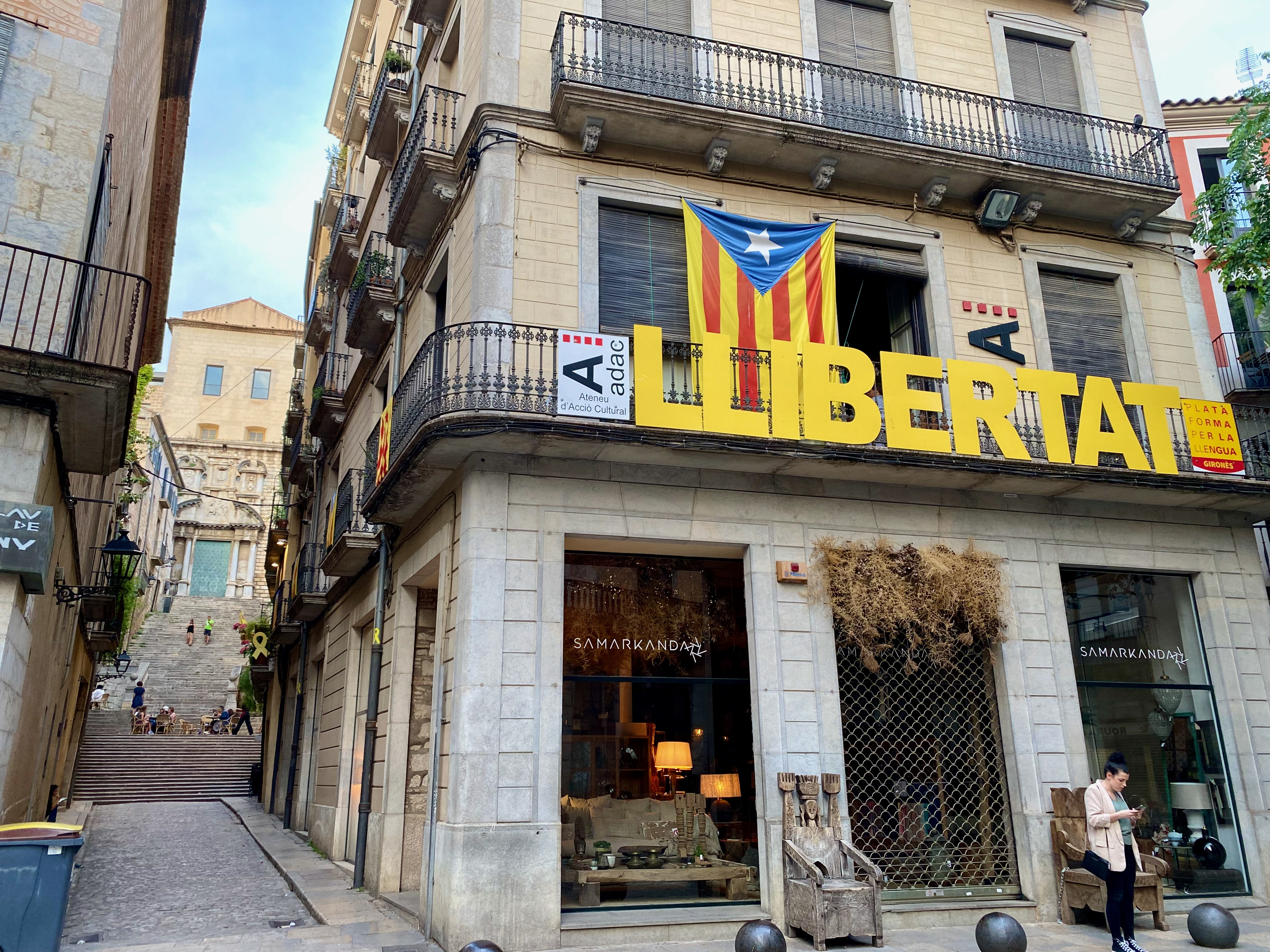
Catalan nationalism on display in Girona

Being a broad movement, Catalan nationalism can be found in several manifestations in the current political scene. Most of the main Catalan political parties— as of 2024, Together for Catalonia (Junts), Republican Left of Catalonia (ERC), Socialists' Party of Catalonia (PSC), Catalunya en Comú (Comuns) and Popular Unity Candidature (CUP)—adhere to Catalanism to varying degrees, though neither the PSC nor Comuns Sumar are usually regarded as Catalan nationalist.

The scope of their national objectives diverges. While some restrict them to Catalonia-proper alone, others seek the acknowledgment of the political personality of the so-called Catalan Countries, the Catalan-speaking territories as a whole. Such claims, which can be seen as a form of Pan-nationalism, can be read in official documents of CiU, ERC and Popular Unity Candidates (CUP). Besides Catalonia, the main Catalan-speaking regions have their own nationalist parties and coalitions which support, to varying degrees, the demands for the building of a national identity for the Catalan Countries: Valencian Nationalist Bloc (BNV) in the Valencian Community, Bloc Nacional i d'Esquerres, PSM and Majorcan Union (UM) in the Balearic Islands. Other nationalist parties have existed with additional affiliations such as PSC - Reagrupament whose leader Josep Pallach i Carolà died in 1977.

The two main Catalan nationalist parties (ERC and Junts) have shown their commitment to the idea of the Catalan Countries in different ways and with different intensities. For the former CiU (from which Junts stems), this issue was not among the main items in their agenda. Nevertheless, CiU has enjoyed a long-term collaboration with the Valencian party BNV and with the Majorcan parties UM and the Socialist Party of Majorca (PSM). In contrast, Republican Left of Catalonia (ERC) has taken more substantial steps in that direction by expanding the party to Roussillon, Balearic Islands and—as Republican Left of the Valencian Country (ERPV)—the Valencian Community.

Catalan nationalists see their movement as a wide one that brings together political parties and citizens from the left as well as from center and right.

== See also ==
- Catalan Countries
- Catalan independence
- Anti-Catalanism
- Catalan symbols
- Basque nationalism
- Corsican nationalism
- Occitan nationalism
- Sardinian nationalism
- History of political Catalanism
