= María del Carme Ribé i Ferré =

Catalan librarian, writer and activist (1920–1991)

María del Carme Ribé i Ferré (1920–1991) was a Catalan librarian, writer, and cultural activist.

Ribé was born in Reus, Tarragona, but moved to Barcelona at the age of 9. During the Spanish Civil War in 1937, as a student athlete she broke the Spanish record for the 200-meter dash. After the Civil War ended, the victorious regime withdrew recognition of her title.

In 1938 Ribé entered library school, and in 1941 she passed her qualifying exams and became a librarian. She worked in the private library of Spanish sports minister and International Olympic Committee president Juan Antonio Samaranch, as well as in the cataloging and acquisitions department of the Biblioteca de Catalunya (National Library of Catalonia).

In addition to her work as a librarian, Ribé authored a novel called Del dia a la nit (From Day to Night, 1968) and, with Teresa Rovira i Comas, Bibliografía histórica del libro infantil en catalán (Historical Bibliography of Children's Literature in Catalan, 1972). She won the Prudenci Bertrana Prize for an autobiographical work, Girasol, a testimonial of the first days of the occupation of Barcelona by Francoist troops. She also advocated and disseminated Catalan culture.

Ribé died in Barcelona in 1991 at the age of 70. A street in Reus is named after her.
