= Memorial of Wrongs =

Memorial of Wrongs (Catalan: Memorial de Greuges) is the popular name given to the report issued in defence of the moral and material interests of Catalonia, sent to King Alfonso XII of Spain in 1885 in the style of old Claims of the Catalan Courts.

The report was published in a ceremony chaired by Joaquim Rubió i Ors and consisted of a series of economic and political demands on the occasion of the trade agreement between Spain and Britain and attempts to unify the Civil Law in Spain. The document was a collaborative effort between the intelligentsia, the middle and upper class, and industrial Catalonia, and was an early political act of Catalan nationalism, forming the basis of what would become the Bases de Manresa in 1892.
