= José Miguel Rovira =

Puerto Rican businessman

- Born: September 29, 1913; Ponce, Puerto Rico
- Died: November 2, 1993 (aged 80); Ponce, Puerto Rico
- Occupation: industrialist
- Known for: Rovira Biscuits Corporation
- Spouse: Josefina del Carmen Passalacqua Santiago
- Children: 3

José Miguel Rovira was a Puerto Rican industrialist and co-founder and main driving force behind Rovira Biscuits Corporation during its formative years.

== Early years ==
Rovira was born in Ponce, Puerto Rico. He was the eldest son of José María Rovira Viza and Mercedes Fernandez. José María Rovira was a Spaniard from Barcelona who had come to Puerto Rico to work as a bookkeeper but eventually established himself as a shopkeeper and who later also purchased a small bread and sweets bakery in 1929 in Ponce.

== Career ==
In 1937, the young José Miguel Rovira, who had studied chemistry, started working at his father's bakery and worked on changing it into a cracker manufacturing enterprise. During the 1940s, and throughout the Second World War, Rovira improved the company's methods to make it more productive. With the death of his father in 1950, José Miguel became the chairman of the family's biscuits manufacturing business. In the 1950s he expanded into a distribution chain that further increased revenue and solidified its position in the cracker manufacturing business.

In 1960 José Miguel contracted with a marketing firm to re-design the logo of the company's cracker containers. While he encountered challenges in the 1960s through 1980s, including a five years legal battle against Keebler which Rovira won, under the leadership of José Miguel the company continued to expand into new markets in the United States, the Caribbean, and South America.

== Death and honors ==
José Miguel Rovira died in 1993. He is honored at Ponce's Park of Illustrious Ponce Citizens.

== See also ==
- Ponce, Puerto Rico
- List of Puerto Ricans
