= Rovira Biscuits Corporation =

Puerto Rican corporation

Coordinates: 18°1′18″N 66°34′28″W

- Type: Private
- Industry: Food
- Founded: 1929
- Founder: José María Rovira Viza
- Headquarters: Ponce, Puerto Rico
- Number of locations: Ponce (2), Guaynabo (1)
- Area served: Puerto Rico, United States, Caribbean
- Key people: Rafael Luis Rovira, CEO; Frances Rovira, vice president Export Sales; Carlos Juan Rovira, President; José Antonio Rovira, board member
- Products: Crackers
- Revenue: $10 Million +
- Number of employees: 50
- Parent: Rovira Foods, Inc.
- Divisions: 6
- Website: Rovira Biscuits Corporation

Rovira Biscuits Corporation is a Puerto Rican corporation that manufactures crackers branded by the same name. The company is well known for its production of "export sodas" crackers. The company's headquarters are located in Urbanizacion La Ceiba, barrio San Anton, in the city of Ponce, Puerto Rico, and its main production facilities are located on PR-10 southbound, in barrio Sabanetas, just south of the intersection with PR-52 exit in Ponce, Puerto Rico.

== History ==
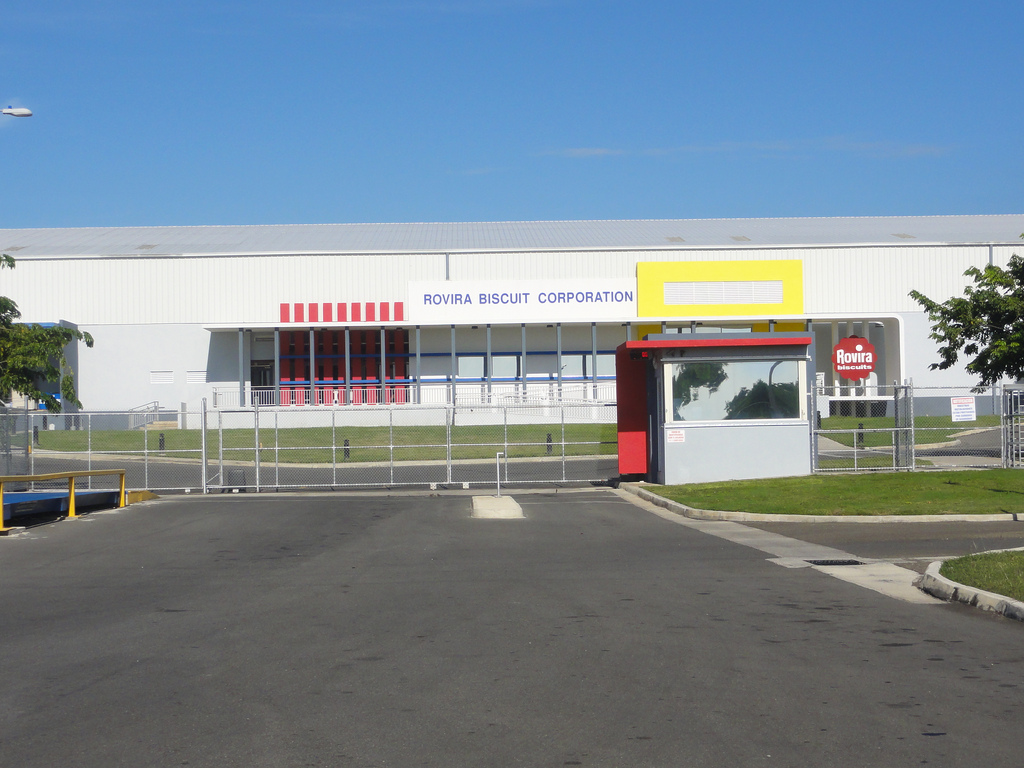
Main entrance to the new facilities of Rovira Biscuits Corporation in Barrio Sabanetas, Ponce, Puerto Rico

The company began in Puerto Rico in 1929 when company founder and Spanish immigrant José María Rovira Viza purchased a small bakery on calle Villa, in downtown Ponce. In 1937, José Miguel Rovira, José María Rovira's son, joined the company and started the transformation into a crackers manufacturer. During the next decade, and throughout the Second World War, the company expanded its product offerings and facilities.

In 1947, the company became a legally registered corporation in Puerto Rico under the name of Rovira Biscuit Corporation and, in the same year, it built new manufacturing facilities in Ponce. In 1952 it moved from its original location in downtown Ponce to the Cuatro Calles sector, near Avenida Las Americas. The new facility provided 50,000 square feet of space. In the early 1950s, further growth allowed the company to start marketing its products to the East Coast of the United States, to satisfy the demand of the large number of Puerto Ricans who had started to migrate there in those years. This was followed by expanding its market to the Caribbean area. In the 1960s, the company added new technology, marketing plans, and management turning "Rovira" into a household name among consumers in Puerto Rico. Also in the 1960s, the company expanded its marketing into areas in the United States beyond the East Coast.

In the 2000s a company spinoff, Rovira Foods, Inc., was established to respond to the growing sales and distribution business in Puerto Rico. It represents the "Rovira" crackers and "Eric’s" snacks brand names in addition to over 10 different product brands in the United States, Spain and Brazil. From this point forward, Rovira Biscuits Corporation, became the manufacturing arm of Rovira Foods, Inc.

In 2009, the company invested $25 million in a new 100,000 square feet corporate facility in the Mercedita sector of Barrio Vayas in Ponce. The company had been operating from a facility one-third that size located in the Cuatro Calles sector of barrio San Antón. The new facility operates 24 hours a day.

== Expansion ==
In addition to its new facility near the intersection of PR-52 and PR-10, Rovira Biscuit Corporation now also operates out of a new facility located on the outskirts of Ponce, close to PR-2. This move is intended to "improve efficiency and production capacity to solidify [the company's] position as the most important cracker manufacturer in Puerto Rico."

== Sales and market share ==
The company has 43% of the cracker business market share of the Island. International exports account for 32% of the company's sales.

== Production ==
The company uses 150,000 pounds (75 tons) of flour every day in its manufacturing of crackers at its 100,000 square feet manufacturing facility.

== Leadership ==
As a private, family business, the company's board of directors consists of Rafael Luis Rovira, president, and Frances Rovira, Carlos Juan Rovira, and José Antonio Rovira, board members.

The leadership structure is as follows:

- Rafael Luis Rovira, chairman of the Board
- Carlos Juan Rovira, President & CEO, Rovira Biscuit Corporation
- José Antonio Rovira, Director of Corporate Development
- Frances M. Rovira, President & CEO, Rovira Foods, Inc. (distribution)

== Legal battle ==
In 1980, Keebler Corporation sued Rovira alleging illegal used of the words "export sodas" in its labels. The U.S. Court of Appeals decided in favor of Rovira, stating that in the minds of Puerto Rican consumers the words "export soda" had come to be associated with the particular type of craker sold by Rovira. The quasi-landmark case was won on the basis that "Rovira's affirmative defense of genericness was not barred by the federal rules."

== Products ==
- Export Sodas
- Export Sodas, Integral
- Export Sodas, Lite
- Vanilla Treats
- Treats Crackers
- Tempting Snack Crackers
- Tita Crackers
- 100to en boca
- Rositas
- Crack'r Crums

== Legacy ==
Jose Miguel Rovira, the son of founder Jose Maria Rovira and first Ponce-born member of the Rovira family is honored at Ponce's Park of Illustrious Ponce Citizens.

== See also ==
- Puerto Rican cuisine
