= Teresa Rovira i Comas =

Catalonian librarian

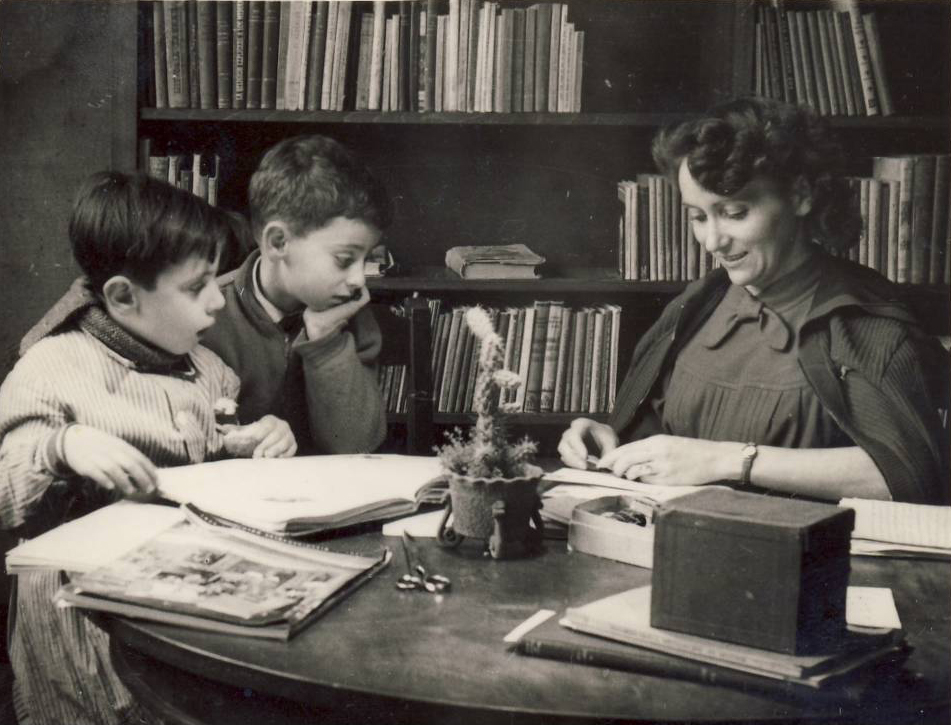
- Teresa Rovira i Comos at the Esparreguera Popular Library, 1950s, with her son Francesc Calvet and another child
- Born: December 13, 1918; Barcelona, Catalonia, Spain
- Died: September 23, 2014 (aged 95)
- Education: Escola de Bibliotecàries
- Occupation: Librarian
- Honours: Creu de Sant Jordi (2002)

Teresa Rovira i Comas (13 December 1918 – 23 September 2014) was a Catalonian librarian and the daughter of Antoni Rovira y Virgili.

== Biography ==
=== Early years ===
Teresa Rovira was born in Barcelona on 13 December 1918, the oldest daughter of writer, historian, and politician Antoni Rovira y Virgili. She studied in the Blanquerna Common School under the direction of Alexandre Galí. From a young age she was a great reader.

At 15 years, in June 1936, she entered the School of Librarians. However, she had to pause her studies when the Spanish Civil War began in July 1936. In 1939, she was exiled to France with her family, while her house library, with all her father's books, was confiscated. She did not recover them until more than seventy years had passed, with the return of some of the Salamanca papers.

=== Exile in France ===
In 1944, she graduated with a degree in arts (History and Geography) from the University of Montpellier. In Montpellier she came to know Felip Calvet, a friend and collaborator of president Josep Irla. She married Calvet in 1946 in Andorra, the only place where they could hold the ceremony in Catalan. The pair settled in Perpiñán, France, where Calvet's business centered on a small factory that produced corks for wine and champagne. He also continued to collaborate with Josep Irla.

Between 1951 and 1952, Rovira was a Spanish teacher for girls in secondary school in Perpiñán. Her visits to Barcelona became more frequent until the point when Rovira finished her library studies in the academic year 1949–1950. She obtained a librarian position at the Popular Library of Esparreguera in 1953, where she took up residence with her son. Felip Calvet remained in Champaña without a passport, and they visited him monthly.

=== Return to Catalonia ===
Rovira and Calvet finally returned from exile in 1958, when Rovira started working in the children's book collection of the Library of Catalonia, which Jordi Rubió (the library director until January 1939) had gathered from the Library of Catalonia and maintained in the historical collection of the Children's Library of Santa Cruz. In this moment, while establishing the bibliography of children's books in the Catalan language, she began to dedicate herself to researching Catalonian children's and youth literature. She was one of the first librarians to separate children's books from adults.

With the librarian Carme Ribé she proposed the creation of a pilot library next to the School of Librarians, an idea that eventually materialized with the creation of the libraries of Sant Pau and Santa Creu.

In 1973, she graduated with a degree in arts from the University of Barcelona. From 1971 to 1981, she managed the Popular Library of Santa Pau. From 1981 to 1983, she was the head of the network of popular libraries of the Provincial Deputation of Barcelona.

In 1986 Max Cahner resumed publishing the Magazine of Catalonia as a continuation of the publication founded by Antoni Rovira i Virgili in 1948. Teresa Rovira was part of the Magazine of Catalonia Foundation, contributing knowledge, experience, and continuity.

She had retired by the time of her death in 2014.

== Publications ==
Two of her books have been models in the field of library science. The first is Bibliografía histórica del libro infantil en catalán (Madrid: ANABAD, 1972), published in collaboration with Carme Ribé. The other, Organización de una biblioteca: escolar, popular o infantil (Barcelona: Ed. 62, 1981), was in collaboration with Concepció Carreras y Concepció Martínez. With her husband, Felip Calvet, she wrote the Bibliografía de Antoni Rovira i Virgilii (1905–1939), today unpublished.

She also wrote articles about children's literature for several publications.

She was a member of the jury of the Award of Honor in Catalan Letters and of the Òmnium Cultural advisory board.

== Awards and recognition ==
In 1970, she was honored with the Ramon d'Alòs-Moner prize, awarded by the Institute for Catalan Studies for her Bibliografía de Antoni Rovira i Virgili (1905–1939), written with her husband. Also, her Bibliografía histórica del libro infantil en catalán, published with Carme Ribé, won the National Prize for Research of Children's and Youth Literature.

In 2002, she received the Creu de Sant Jordi for her work in the field of children's and youth literature, particularly in the Catalan language. In 2003, she was named Adopted Daughter of Sant Feliu de Guíxols, her husband's hometown, and he was named Favorite Son posthumously.

She received the 2008 Aurora Díaz Plaja Prize in Children's and Youth Literature for 2007 work for her chapter "The book for children and adolescents: from origins to defeat" in The heritage of the imagination: yesterday's books for today's readers (Palma: Instituto de Estudios Baleáricos, 2007).

The Library Service of the Generalitat de Catalunya created a prize for innovation in public libraries named after her in 2013. It is awarded annually.
