= Valentí Almirall i Llozer =

Catalan politician (1841–1904)

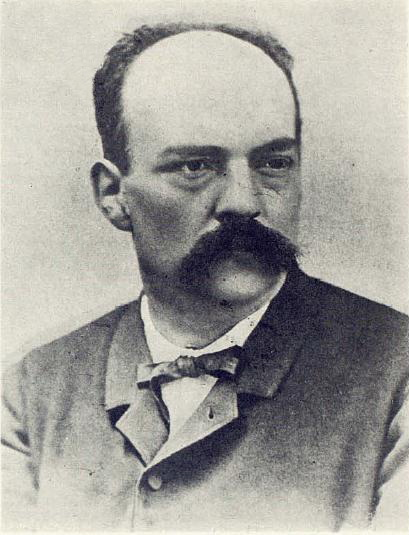
- From the Diari Català (1879)

Personal details
- Born: 8 March 1841
- Died: 1904 (aged 62–63)

Valentí Almirall i Llozer (Catalan pronunciation: [bələnˈti əlmiˈɾaʎ]; Barcelona, Catalonia, Spain, 8 March 1841 – 1904) was a Catalan politician, considered one of the fathers of modern Catalan nationalism, and more specifically, of the left-wing variety.

== Biography ==
=== Education ===
Valentí Almirall was the son of Josep Almirall i Alier, a merchant in drugs (medicinal substances) and Colonial goods, and of Josepa Llozer i Cebrià, heiress to the Barony of El Papiol — a title which Almirall consistently declined to use, despite being entitled to it as the firstborn son.

He initially studied at the Barcelona School of Fine Arts, but was forced to leave after criticizing his teacher, the painter Claudi Lorenzale. Almirall was fluent in Greek, Latin, French, English, Italian, and German, which enabled him to travel widely and engage with modern European cultural and intellectual life.

At the University of Barcelona, he studied Philosophy from 1854 to 1857, and Law from 1857 to 1863, the year he earned his degree, although he rarely practiced law.

He was a frequent participant in the tertúlies (literary gatherings) held in the back room of the shop owned by the writer Frederic Soler, known by his pen name Pitarra. With Soler, he helped launch modern Catalan-language theatre, using the spoken language of the time. These gatherings brought together other intellectuals such as Gonçal Serraclara, Conrad Roure, Anselm Clavé, Josep Lluís Pellicer, Innocenci López i Bernagossi, and Josep Feliu i Codina.

=== Politics ===
Almirall's comfortable economic background and his limited interest in practicing law led him toward active political engagement. He participated in the planning and execution of the Revolution of 1868 in Barcelona. During this time, he directed the newspaper El Federalista and collaborated with the journal Revista Republicano-Federal, from which he published several highly radical pamphlets, such as ¡Guerra a Madrid! and Bases para la Constitución federal de la Nación Española y para la del Estado de Cataluña. Observaciones sobre el modo de plantear la confederación en España. He declared himself openly hostile to any agreement with monarchists and played a prominent role in the Pact of Tortosa (signed on 18 May 1869), an agreement between republican representatives from Catalonia, the Valencian Community, the Balearic Islands, and Aragon in support of a federal structure for Spain.

Between 1868 and 1881, he was active in the Federal Democratic Republican Party (PRDF), where he became the leading figure of the intransigent federalist faction in Barcelona—a minority group within the federal republican movement. This faction was centered around the Club dels Federalistes (1868–1869), of which Almirall was the first president, and around the newspaper El Estado Catalán (published in 1869–1870 and again in 1873). Between 1868 and 1869, he led the publication of El Federalista, which was noted for its radical, intransigent, maximalist positions.

The group advocated for transforming the centralized and homogenizing Spanish state into a federal and decentralized one, through a bottom-up federal revolution initiated by the popular classes. This revolution aimed to divide Spanish sovereignty between the historic regions and a federal government. In this context, in 1868 Almirall published his Bases para la Constitución federal de la Nación Española y para la del Estado de Catalunya. That same year, he participated in the Pact of Tortosa and founded the federalist newspaper El Estado Catalán.

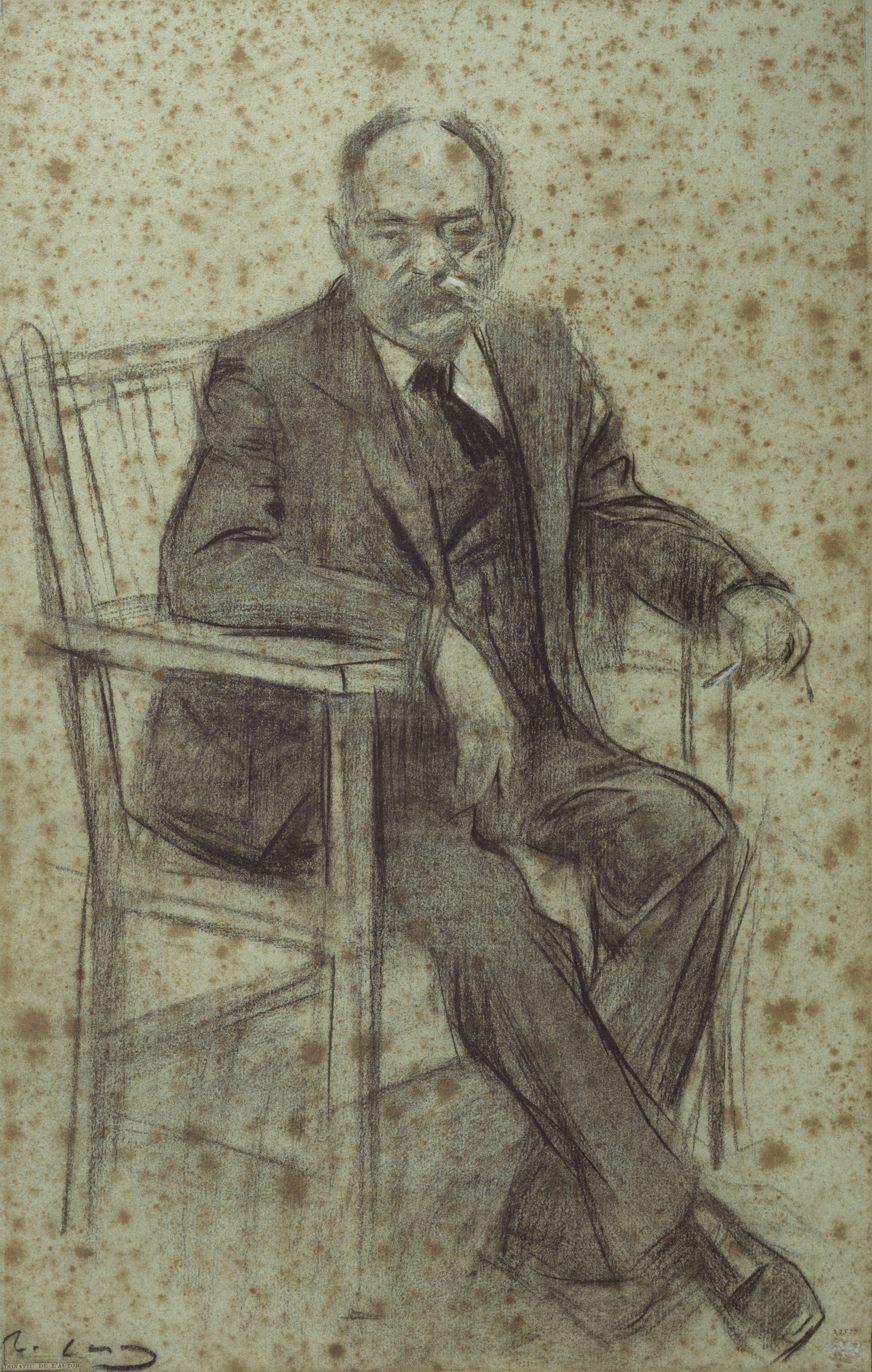
Portrait of Valentí Almirall by Ramon Casas (MNAC)

In September 1869, Almirall took part in the federalist revolt in Barcelona. He was captured and interned in the Balearic Islands, but managed to escape along with other prisoners. He fled first to Algiers and then to Marseille, where he remained in exile until the granting of a general amnesty.

Upon returning to Barcelona, he stood as a candidate in the mayoral elections, but he refused to take an oath incompatible with his republican convictions and was thus unable to assume office. In April 1870, he also contributed to the anti-conscription uprising through his articles in the satirical newspaper La Campana de Gràcia.

In 1871, the then-president of the Barcelona Provincial Council, Anselm Clavé, appointed Almirall as director of the Casa de la Caritat (House of Charity) in the Catalan capital, where he applied rationalist and humanist principles. He would later resign from the position following the fall of the Republic.

=== First Spanish Republic ===
When the First Spanish Republic was proclaimed on 11 February 1873, Almirall moved to Madrid, where he continued publishing El Estado Catalán (from 8 March to 11 June 1873), a journal advocating for Catalan federalism. However, he soon became disillusioned with the direction the Republic was taking and returned to Barcelona.

=== Bourbon Restoration ===
During the Bourbon Restoration, Valentí Almirall diminished his public activity and tried to dedicate himself to literature under the pseudonym A. Z. Sota. In fact, in 1879, he published two novels. A year earlier, in 1878, he was appointed president of the Ateneu Lliure de Barcelona.

On May 4, 1879, he began publishing the Diari Català, the first newspaper in the Catalan language, which he directed until its suspension in June 1881, when he broke with Francesc Pi i Margall and the majority of the Partit Republicà Democràtic Federal Catalan branch. In 1880, he was one of the organizers of the First Catalanist Congress, and was elected president by the majority of congressmen. In 1881, he intervened in the organization of the Congress of Catalan Jurists, where he energetically defended Catalan law.

In 1882, he founded the Centre Català of Barcelona (which would become a political party in 1884), becoming its secretary while his friend Pitarra was president. In 1883, from the Centre Català, he organized the Second Catalanist Congress, which condemned the participation of Catalans in political parties subject to the discipline of Madrid.

Converted into a leader of the Catalanist cause, in 1885 he was the drafting reporter of the Memorial of Grievances, and moved to Madrid as part of the commission that delivered the document to King Alfons XII. In 1886, he published his seminal work, Lo catalanisme, the first systematic exposition of Catalanist doctrine. In 1887, he was elected president of the Centre Català, but his hostile attitude towards the project of the 1888 Universal Exhibition and to the mayor Francesc Rius i Taulet caused a split with the younger conservative elements, who founded the Lliga de Catalunya. He opposed the appointment of Regent Maria Cristina of Austria as queen of the Floral Games of 1888 and organized alternative games.

The decline of the Centre Català's political influence favored the rise of the young Lliga de Catalunya; together with his declining health, these factors made his character bitter. He was the executor of the late Rossend Arús, which led him to found the Biblioteca Arús in 1895. Still, in 1896 he was elected president of the Ateneu Barcelonès, and delivered a notable presidential speech on regionalism. From this position, he called attention to the procés de Montjuïc. Some small federalist and republican groups, as well as Alejandro Lerroux, tried to politically recover him, but he refused.

In 1898 he married his partner, Rosalia Palma Rodríguez, using an artifice to avoid having to marry in the vicarage: they married in articulo mortis. He finally died of apoplexy, leaving his house in the city of Barcelona to create a public school and donating his books to the Biblioteca Arús.

In Vallvidrera stands the tower where he lived (with the front inscribed «V. Amirall»), and next to it, a house where his widow gathered his library. Dating from 1924, the decoration is full of Masonic symbolism.

== Works ==
Cover of Lo Catalanisme (1886)

- Idea exacta de la Federación. La República Federal Española. Datos para su organización (1873) – An Exact Idea of the Federation. The Spanish Federal Republic. Data for its Organization
- El alma al diablo (1878) – novel
- Una autoridad modelo. Historia de un gobernador de orden (1878) – A Model Authority. History of a Lawful Governor (novel)
- Escritos catalanistas. El Renacimiento catalán, las leyes forales y el carlismo en Cataluña (1878) – Catalanist Writings. The Catalan Renaissance, Foral Laws and Carlism in Catalonia
- La Casa de Caridad de Barcelona (1879) – The House of Charity of Barcelona
- La Confederación suiza y la Unión americana. Estudio político comparativo (1881?) – The Swiss Confederation and the American Union. A Comparative Political Study
- El Tiro federal suizo: descripción de la fiesta en 1883 (1883) – The Swiss Federal Shooting: Description of the Festival in 1883
- Los Estados Unidos de América. Estudio Político (1884) – The United States of America. Political Study
- Lo Catalanisme. Motius que el legitimen, fonaments científics i solucions pràctiques (1886) – Catalanism. Reasons That Justify It, Scientific Foundations and Practical Solutions
- Poesia del Regionalisme (1886) – Poetry of Regionalism
- España tal como es (1886) – Spain as It Is
- Regionalisme i particularisme (1901) – Regionalism and Particularism
- Aspecte polític i social del renaixement català (1901) – Political and Social Aspect of the Catalan Renaissance

== Bibliography ==
- 'Valentí Almirall' by Antoni Rovira i Virgili (1936)
