= Antoni Rovira i Virgili =

Spanish politician

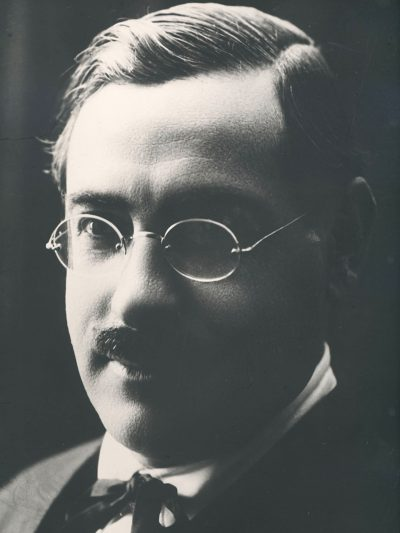

4th President of the Catalan Parliament In the exile
- In office October 15, 1940 – December 5, 1949
- Preceded by: Josep Irla
- Succeeded by: Manuel Serra i Moret

Personal details
- Born: 26 November 1882 Tarragona (Catalonia, Spain)
- Died: 5 December 1949 (aged 67) Perpignan, France
- Party: Federal Nationalist Republican Union (1910–1913); Catalan Action (1922–1930); Republican Action of Catalonia (1930–1932); ERC (1932–1949)

Antoni Rovira i Virgili (Catalan pronunciation: [ənˈtɔni ruˈβiɾəj βiɾˈʒili]) (26 November 1882 – 5 December 1949) was a Catalan politician and journalist who was president of Catalonia's Parliament in exile after the Spanish Civil War. His term of office lasted from 1940 to 1949.

In his honour, a university in Catalonia is named after him, the Rovira i Virgili University in Tarragona, with centres also in Reus, Vila-seca, Tortosa and el Vendrell.

He always showed great interest in the Catalan language, as one of his well-known statements shows:

For us Catalans, our language is our spirit's blood. Out of all our worldly heritage, we love no other treasure more deeply than our language.

Due to this avid interest in his native language, Rovira i Virgili was fascinated by the great Catalan linguist, Pompeu Fabra and published several articles about him and his work. Rovira i Virgili was fascinated by Fabra's presence and frequently made reference to Fabra's sparkling eyes.

From a linguistic perspective, Rovira i Virgili implemented the orthographic and grammatical suggestions made by Pompeu Fabra regarding the Catalan language prior to any formal acceptance of the suggestions by relevant institutions. As a renowned journalist, he exemplified a general tendency of contemporary Catalan intellectuals and authors to accept the linguistic reform introduced by Fabra.

Antoni Rovira i Virgili met Pompeu Fabra for the first time personally around the year 1911, when he was writing for a newspaper called El Poble Català. He was already then a great believer in the linguist's thesis, but Fabra had not yet become the unarguable referent of the codification of contemporary Catalan.

At that time there was the belief that the said formal codification of the language would be an easily fulfilled objective due to the recent creation in 1907 of the Institut d'Estudis Catalans. There was, nevertheless, a certain tension among the different existing experts opinions on what the codification should consist of and who should carry out its leadership.

His daughter Teresa Rovira i Comas helped carry out his legacy.

== Books translated to English language ==
In 2012, the editor "Publicacions URV" (University Rovira i Virgily from Tarragona), published the complete translation of his work "In Defense of Democracy".
