= List of diplomatic missions of Spain =

This is a list of diplomatic missions of Spain, excluding honorary consulates. The Kingdom of Spain has a large global diplomatic presence. As of 2026, Spain has 218 diplomatic posts: 116 embassies, 91 consulates and 11 permanent representations.

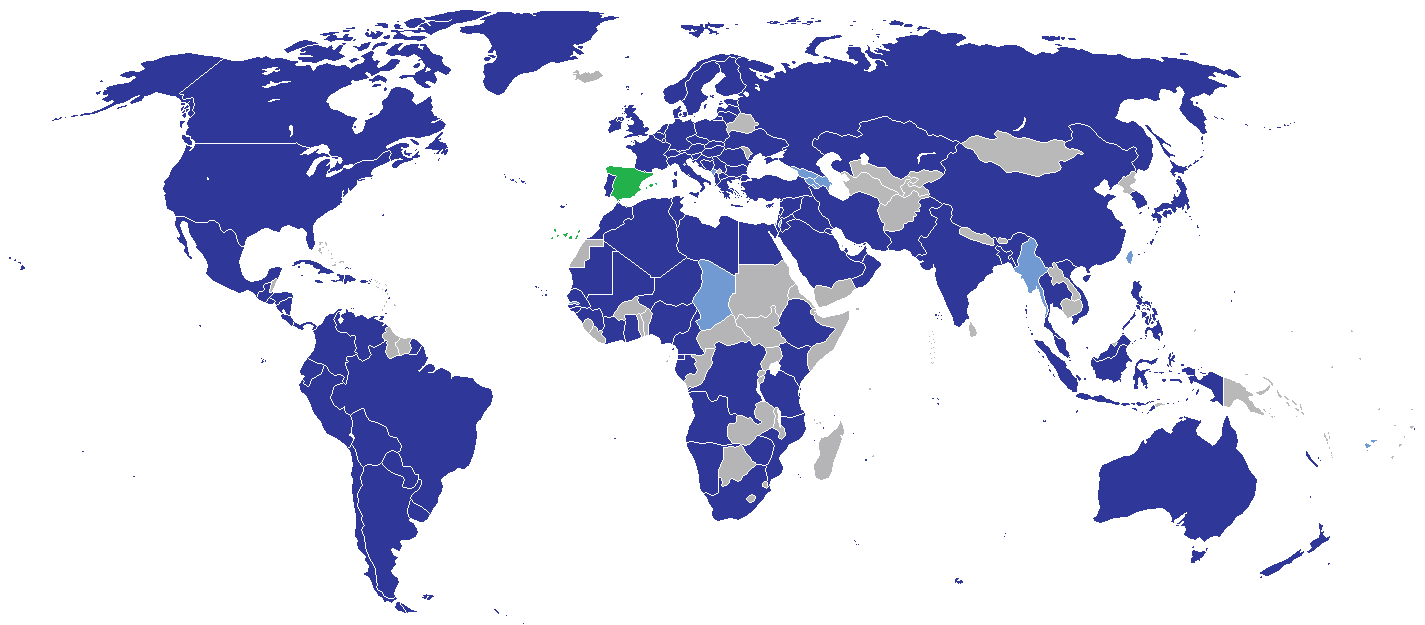
Kingdom of Spain Countries that host Spanish embassies Countries that host only Spanish embassy branch offices, and missions that serve as de facto embassies

== Current missions ==
=== Africa ===
Host country	Host city	Mission	Concurrent accreditation	Ref.
Algeria	Algiers	Embassy		
Algeria	Algiers	Consulate-General		
Algeria	Oran	Consulate-General		
Angola	Luanda	Embassy		
Cameroon	Yaoundé	Embassy	Countries: Central African Republic; Chad	
Cape Verde	Praia	Embassy		
Chad	N'Djamena	Embassy office (Note: Subordinate to the embassy in Yaoundé, Cameroon.)		
Congo-Kinshasa	Kinshasa	Embassy	Countries: Congo-Brazzaville	
Egypt	Cairo	Embassy		
Equatorial Guinea	Malabo	Embassy		
Equatorial Guinea	Bata	Consulate-General		
Ethiopia	Addis Ababa	Embassy	Countries: Djibouti; Seychelles; International organizations: African Union; Intergovernmental Authority on Development; United Nations Economic Commission for Africa	
Gabon	Libreville	Embassy	Countries: São Tomé and Príncipe	
Gambia	Banjul	Embassy office (Note: Subordinate to the embassy in Dakar, Senegal.)		
Ghana	Accra	Embassy	Countries: Togo	
Guinea	Conakry	Embassy	Countries: Sierra Leone	
Guinea-Bissau	Bissau	Embassy		
Ivory Coast	Abidjan	Embassy	Countries: Liberia	
Kenya	Nairobi	Embassy	Countries: Somalia; Uganda; International organizations: United Nations; United Nations Environment Programme; United Nations Human Settlements Programme	
Libya	Tripoli	Embassy		
Mali	Bamako	Embassy	Countries: Burkina Faso	
Mauritania	Nouakchott	Embassy		
Mauritania	Nouadhibou	Consulate-General		
Morocco	Rabat	Embassy		
Morocco	Rabat	Consulate-General		
Morocco	Agadir	Consulate-General		
Morocco	Casablanca	Consulate-General		
Morocco	Larache	Consulate-General		
Morocco	Nador	Consulate-General		
Morocco	Tangier	Consulate-General		
Morocco	Tétouan	Consulate-General		
Mozambique	Maputo	Embassy	Countries: Eswatini	
Namibia	Windhoek	Embassy	Countries: Botswana	
Niger	Niamey	Embassy		
Nigeria	Abuja	Embassy	Countries: Benin; International organizations: Economic Community of West African States	
Nigeria	Lagos	Consulate-General	Countries: Benin; International organizations: Economic Community of West African States	
Senegal	Dakar	Embassy	Countries: Gambia	
Senegal	Dakar	Consulate-General		
South Africa	Pretoria	Embassy	Countries: Comoros; Lesotho; Madagascar; Mauritius	
South Africa	Cape Town	Consulate-General	Countries: Comoros; Lesotho; Madagascar; Mauritius	
Tanzania	Dar Es Salaam	Embassy	Countries: Burundi; Rwanda	
Tunisia	Tunis	Embassy		
Zimbabwe	Harare	Embassy	Countries: Malawi; Zambia	

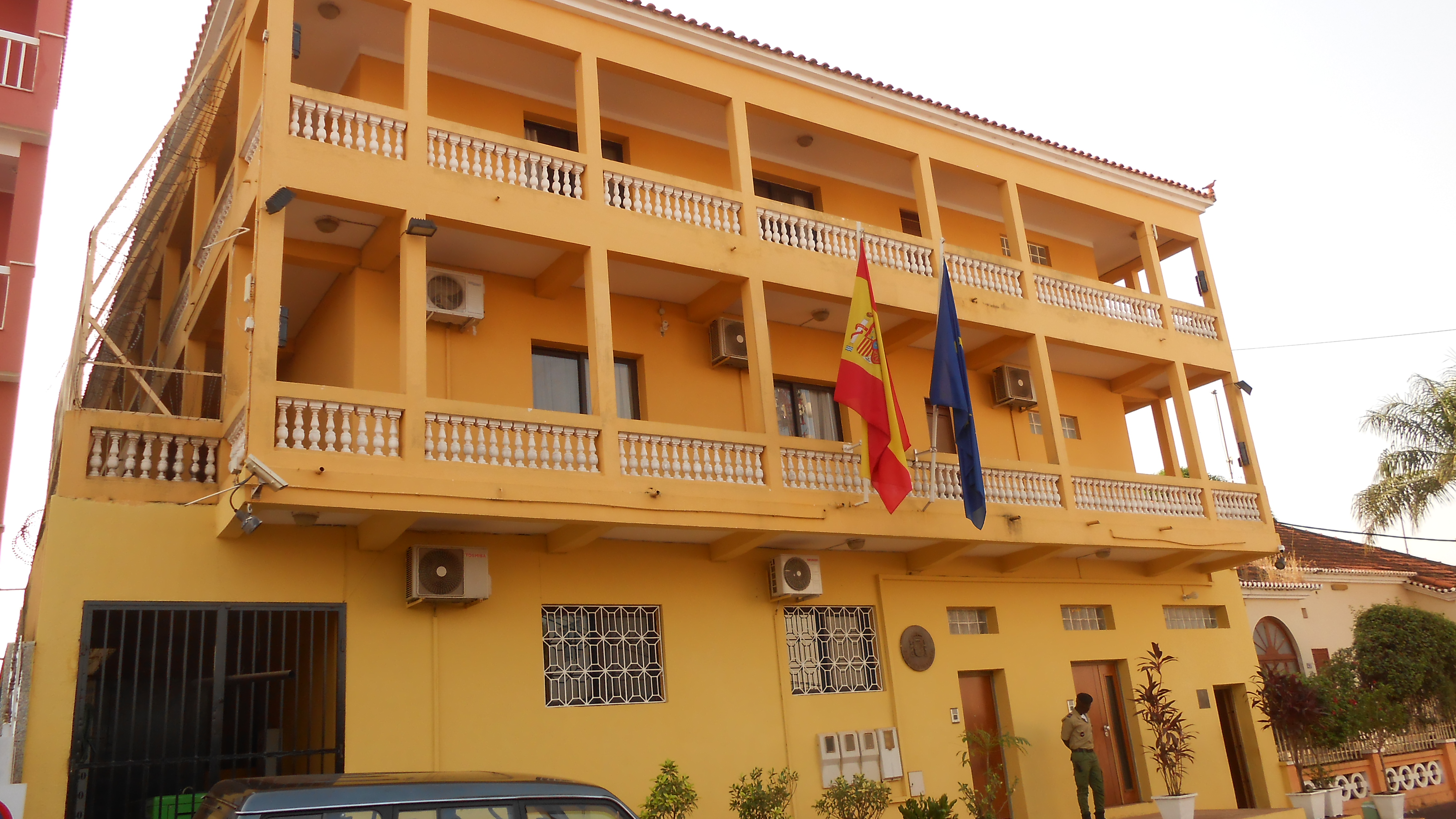
Embassy in Bissau

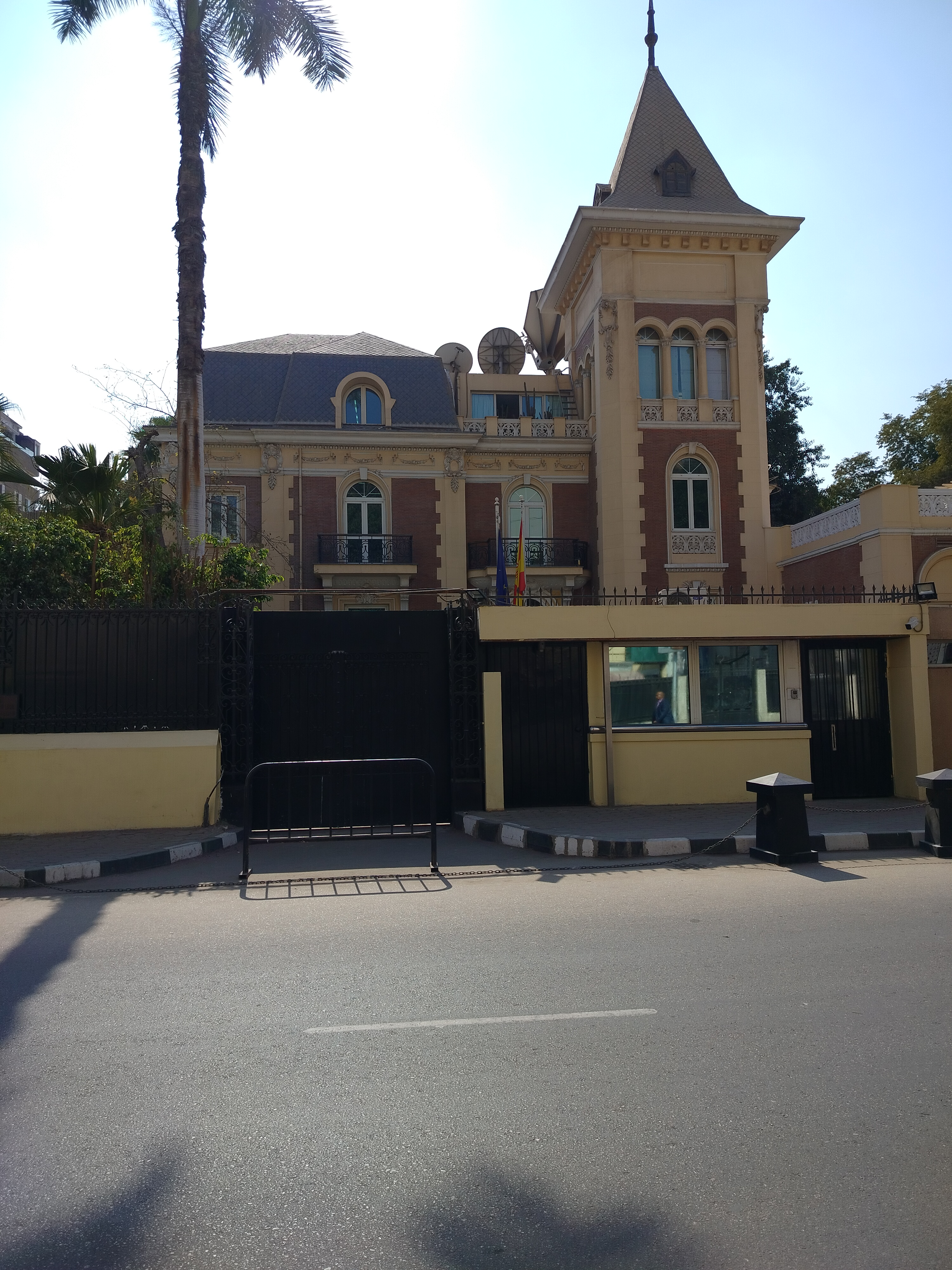
Embassy in Cairo

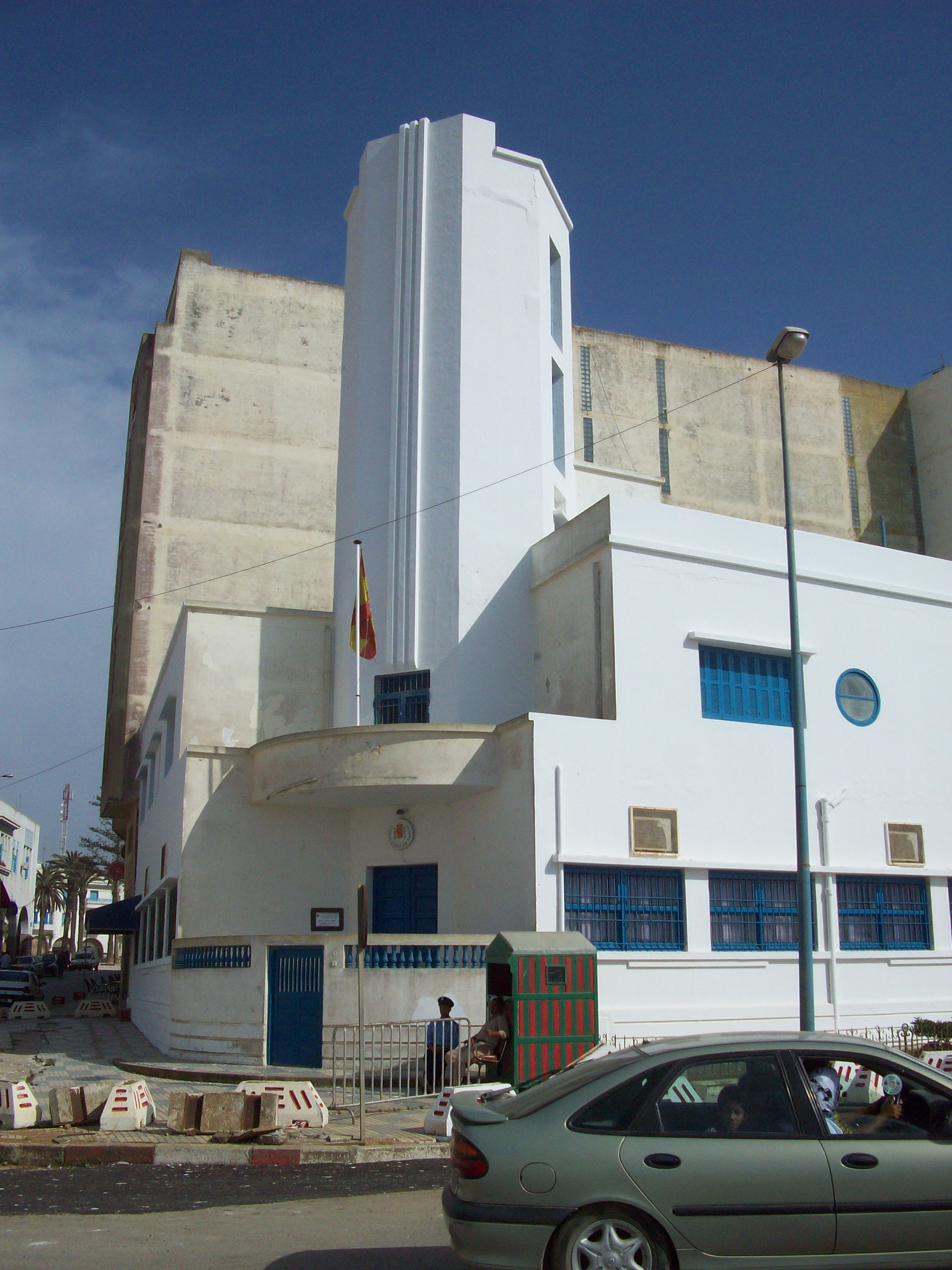
Consulate-General in Larache

=== Americas ===
Host country	Host city	Mission	Concurrent accreditation	Ref.
Argentina	Buenos Aires	Embassy		
Argentina	Buenos Aires	Consulate-General		
Argentina	Bahía Blanca	Consulate-General		
Argentina	Córdoba	Consulate-General		
Argentina	Mendoza	Consulate-General		
Argentina	Rosario	Consulate-General		
Bolivia	La Paz	Embassy		
Bolivia	Santa Cruz de la Sierra	Consulate-General		
Brazil	Brasília	Embassy		
Brazil	Porto Alegre	Consulate-General		
Brazil	Rio de Janeiro	Consulate-General		
Brazil	Salvador	Consulate-General		
Brazil	São Paulo	Consulate-General		
Canada	Ottawa	Embassy		
Canada	Montreal	Consulate-General		
Canada	Toronto	Consulate-General		
Chile	Santiago de Chile	Embassy		
Chile	Santiago de Chile	Consulate-General		
Colombia	Bogotá	Embassy		
Colombia	Bogotá	Consulate-General		
Costa Rica	San José	Embassy		
Cuba	Havana	Embassy		
Cuba	Havana	Consulate-General		
Cuba	Camagüey	Consulate-General		
Dominican Republic	Santo Domingo	Embassy		
Dominican Republic	Santo Domingo	Consulate-General		
Ecuador	Quito	Embassy		
Ecuador	Quito	Consulate-General		
Ecuador	Guayaquil	Consulate-General		
El Salvador	San Salvador	Embassy		
Guatemala	Guatemala City	Embassy	Countries: Belize	
Haiti	Port-au-Prince	Embassy		
Honduras	Tegucigalpa	Embassy		
Jamaica	Kingston	Embassy	Countries: Antigua and Barbuda; Bahamas; Dominica; Saint Kitts and Nevis; International organizations: International Seabed Authority	
Mexico	Mexico City	Embassy		
Mexico	Mexico City	Consulate-General		
Mexico	Guadalajara	Consulate-General		
Mexico	Monterrey	Consulate-General		
Nicaragua	Managua	Embassy		
Panama	Panama City	Embassy		
Paraguay	Asunción	Embassy		
Peru	Lima	Embassy		
Peru	Lima	Consulate-General		
Trinidad and Tobago	Port of Spain	Embassy	Countries: Barbados; Grenada; Guyana; Saint Lucia; Saint Vincent and the Grenadines; Suriname	
United States	Washington, D.C.	Embassy		
United States	Boston	Consulate-General		
United States	Chicago	Consulate-General		
United States	Houston	Consulate-General		
United States	Los Angeles	Consulate-General		
United States	Miami	Consulate-General		
United States	New York City	Consulate-General		
United States	San Francisco	Consulate-General		
United States	San Juan, Puerto Rico	Consulate-General		
Uruguay	Montevideo	Embassy		
Uruguay	Montevideo	Consulate-General		
Venezuela	Caracas	Embassy		
Venezuela	Caracas	Consulate-General		

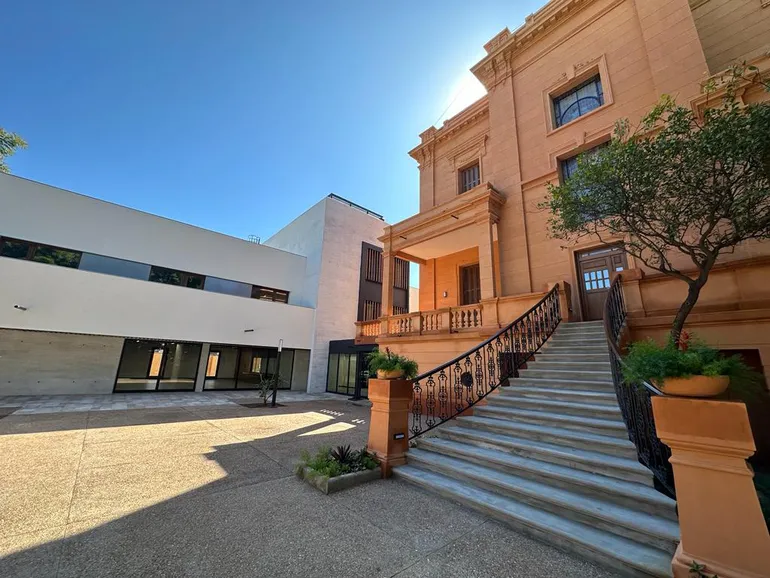
Embassy in Asunción

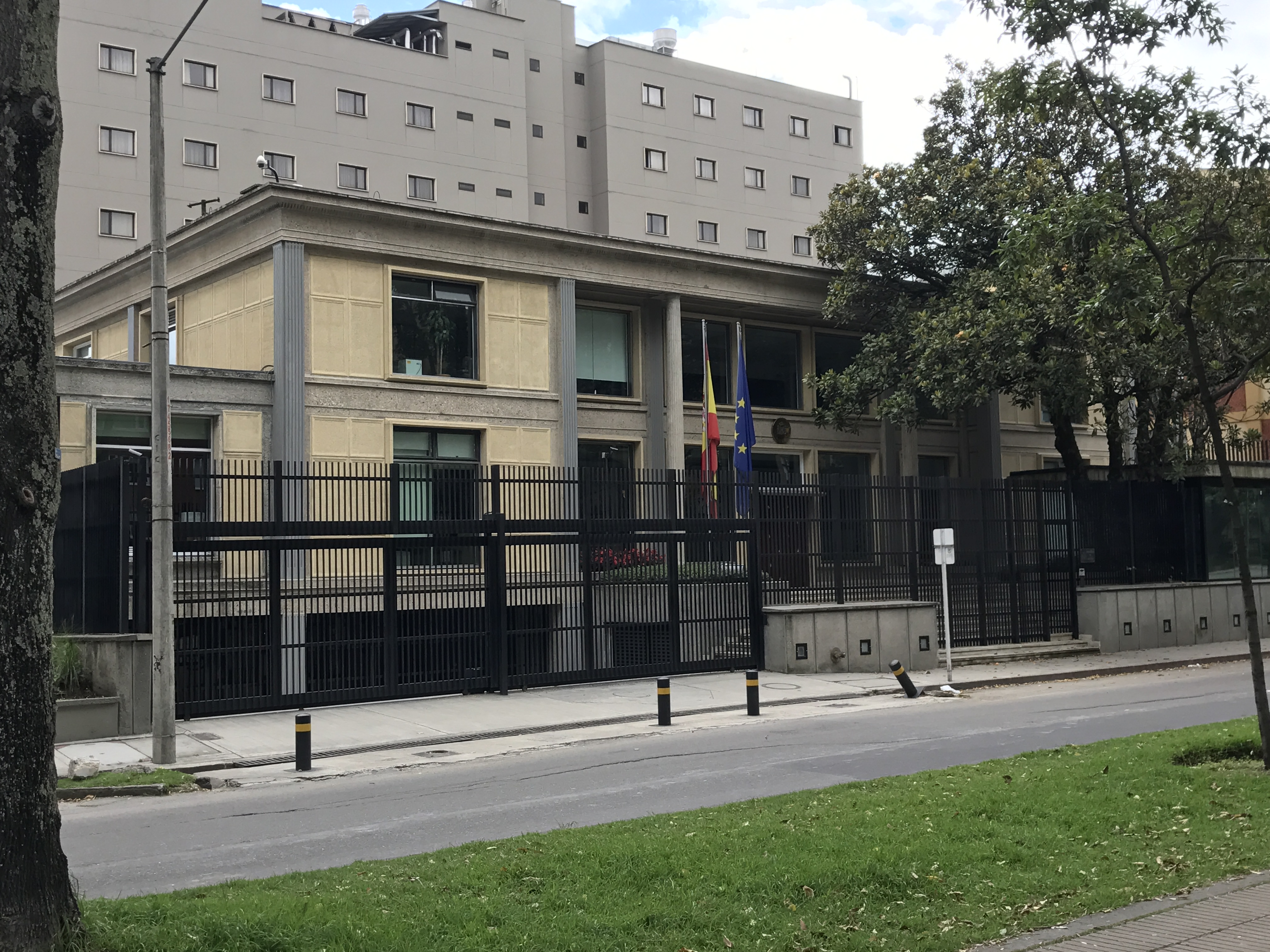
Embassy in Bogotá

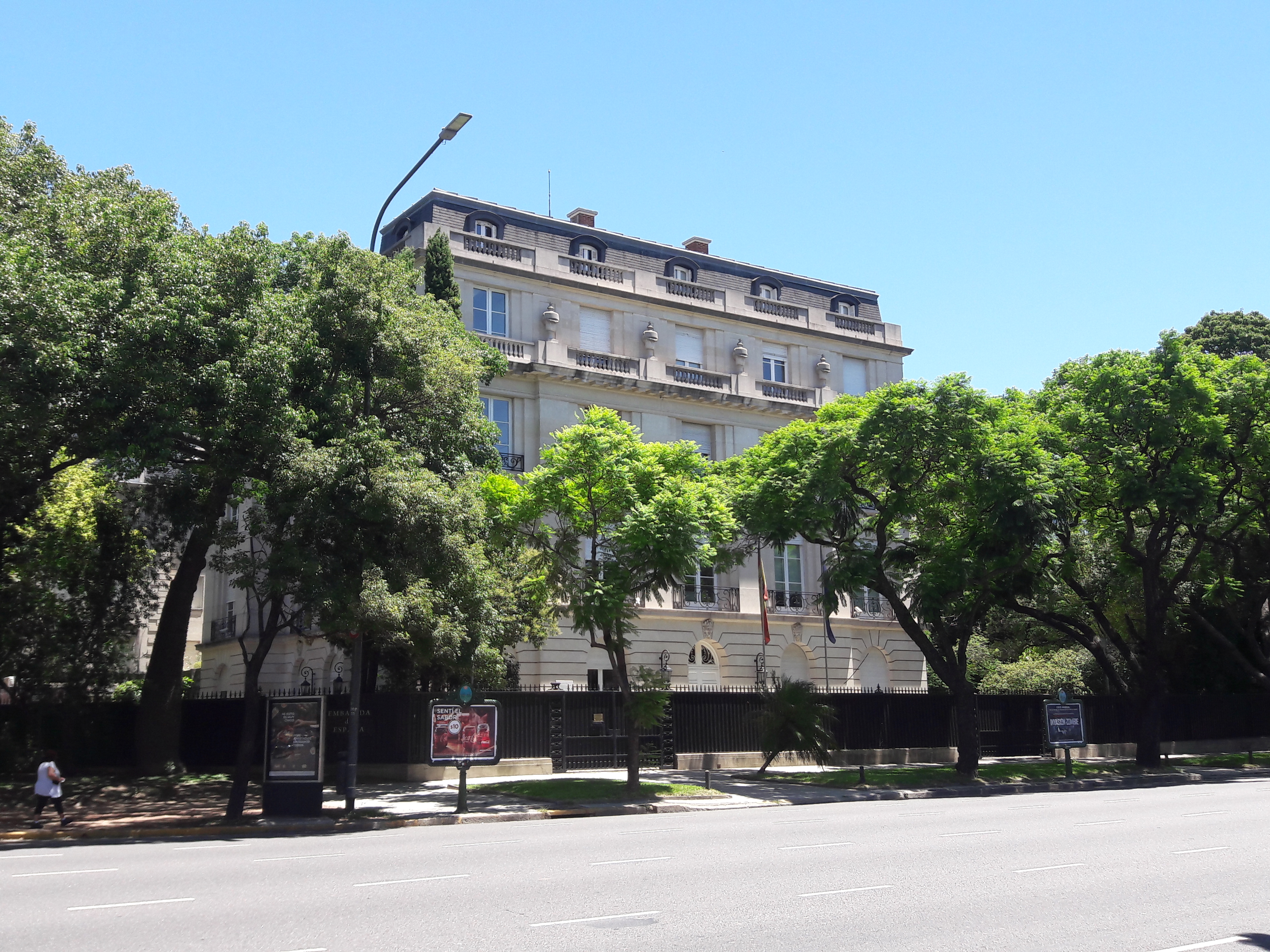
Embassy in Buenos Aires

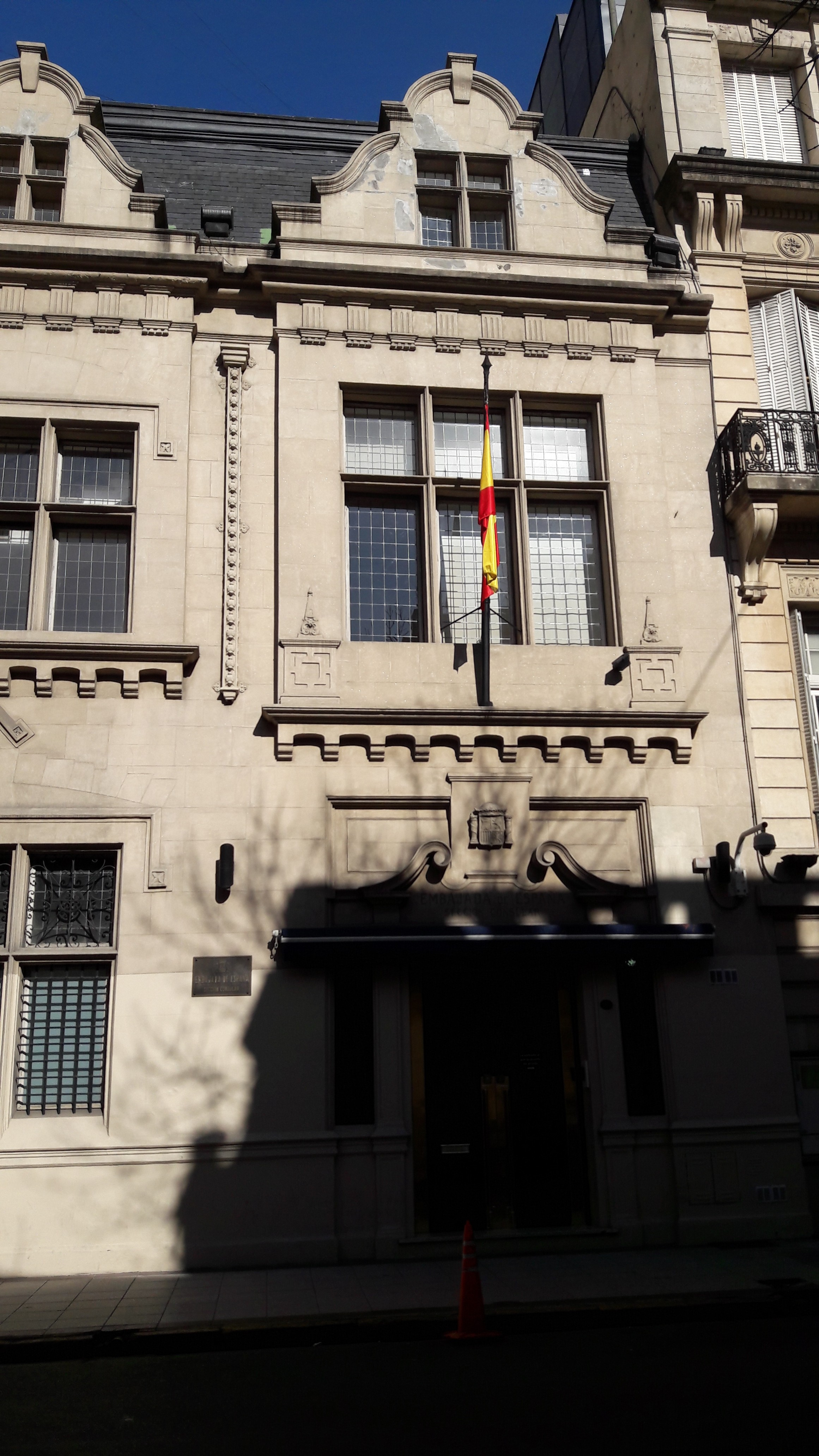
Consulate-General in Buenos Aires

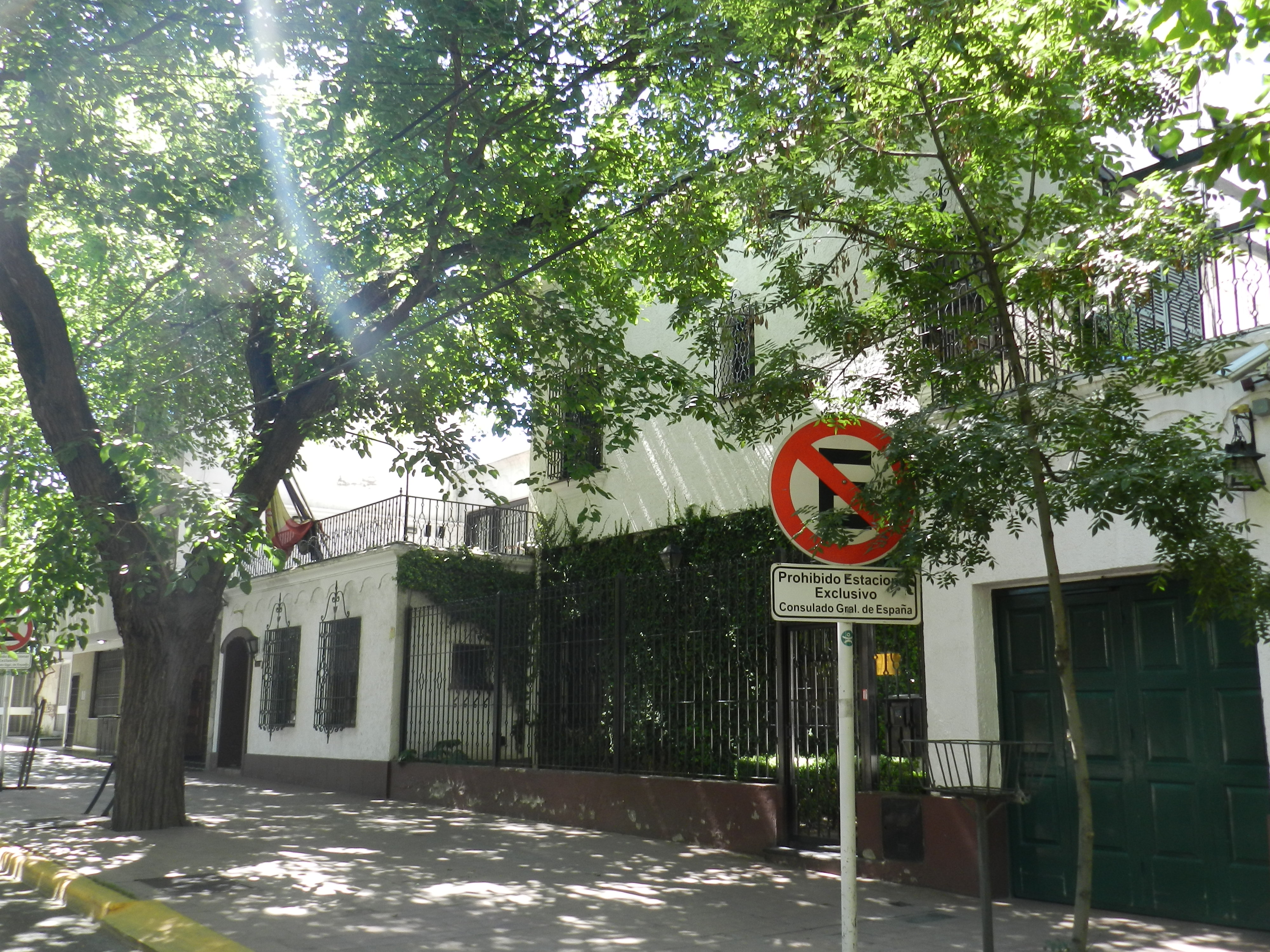
Consulate-General in Mendoza

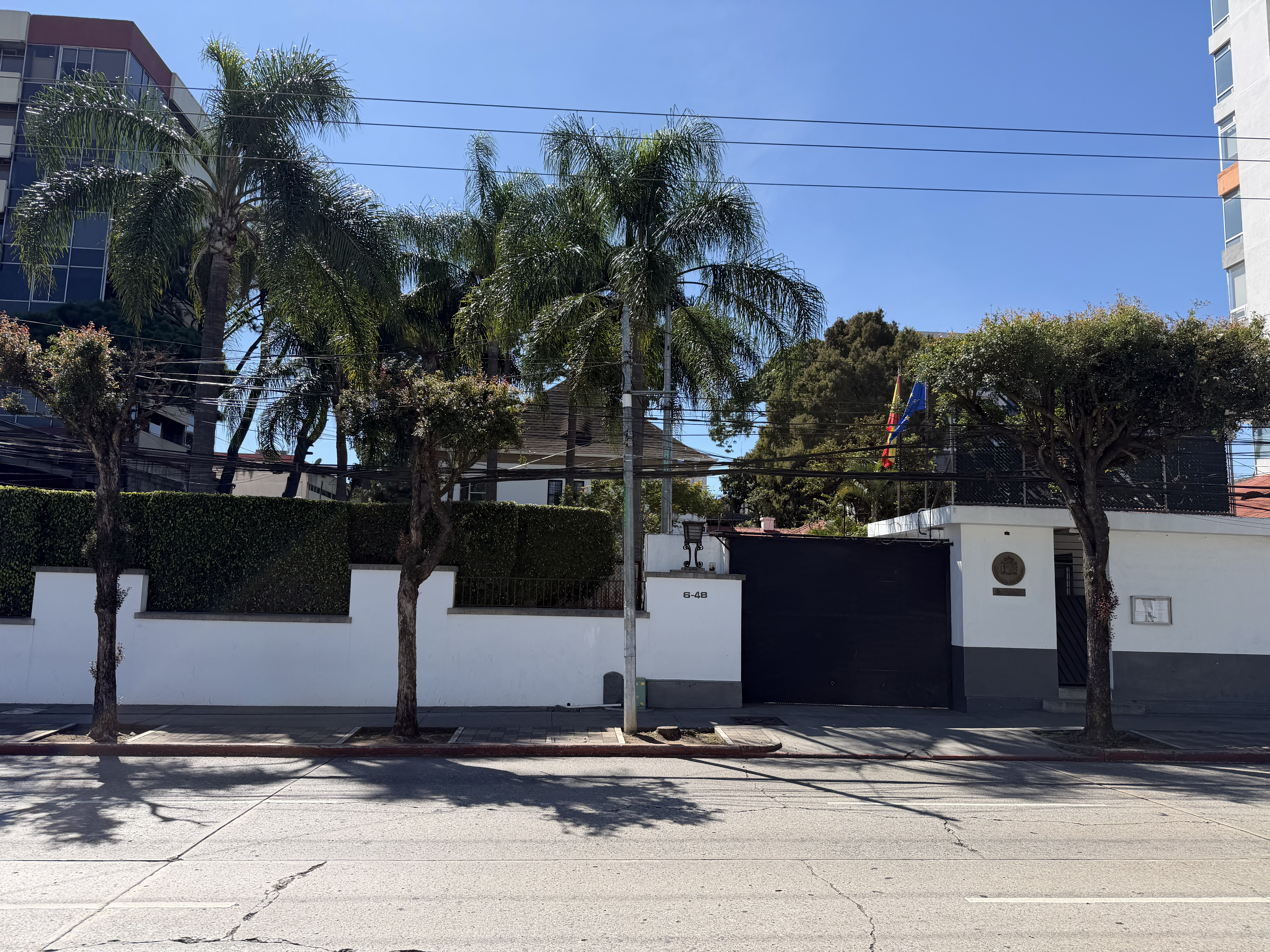
Embassy in Guatemala City

Embassy in Havana

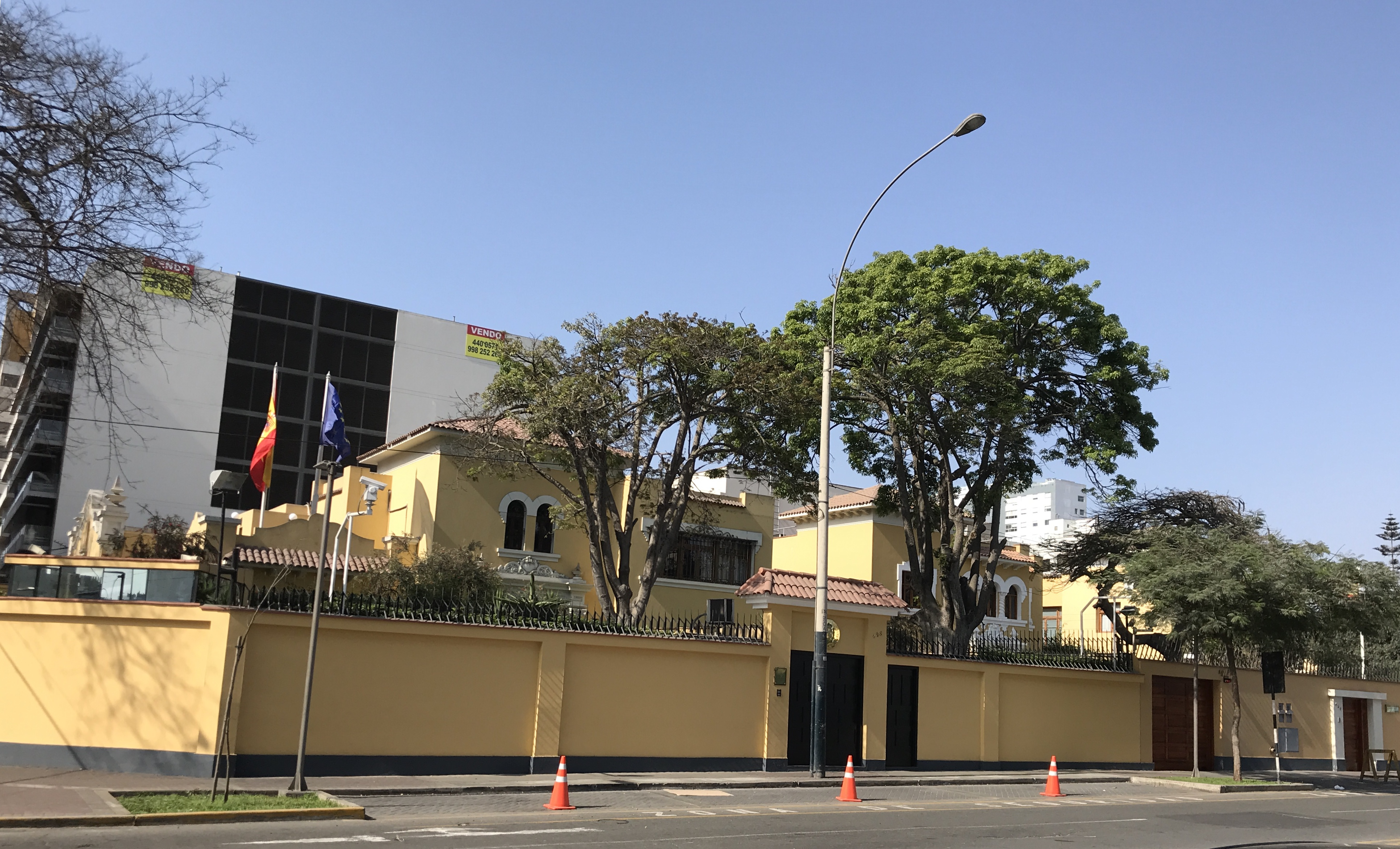
Embassy in Lima

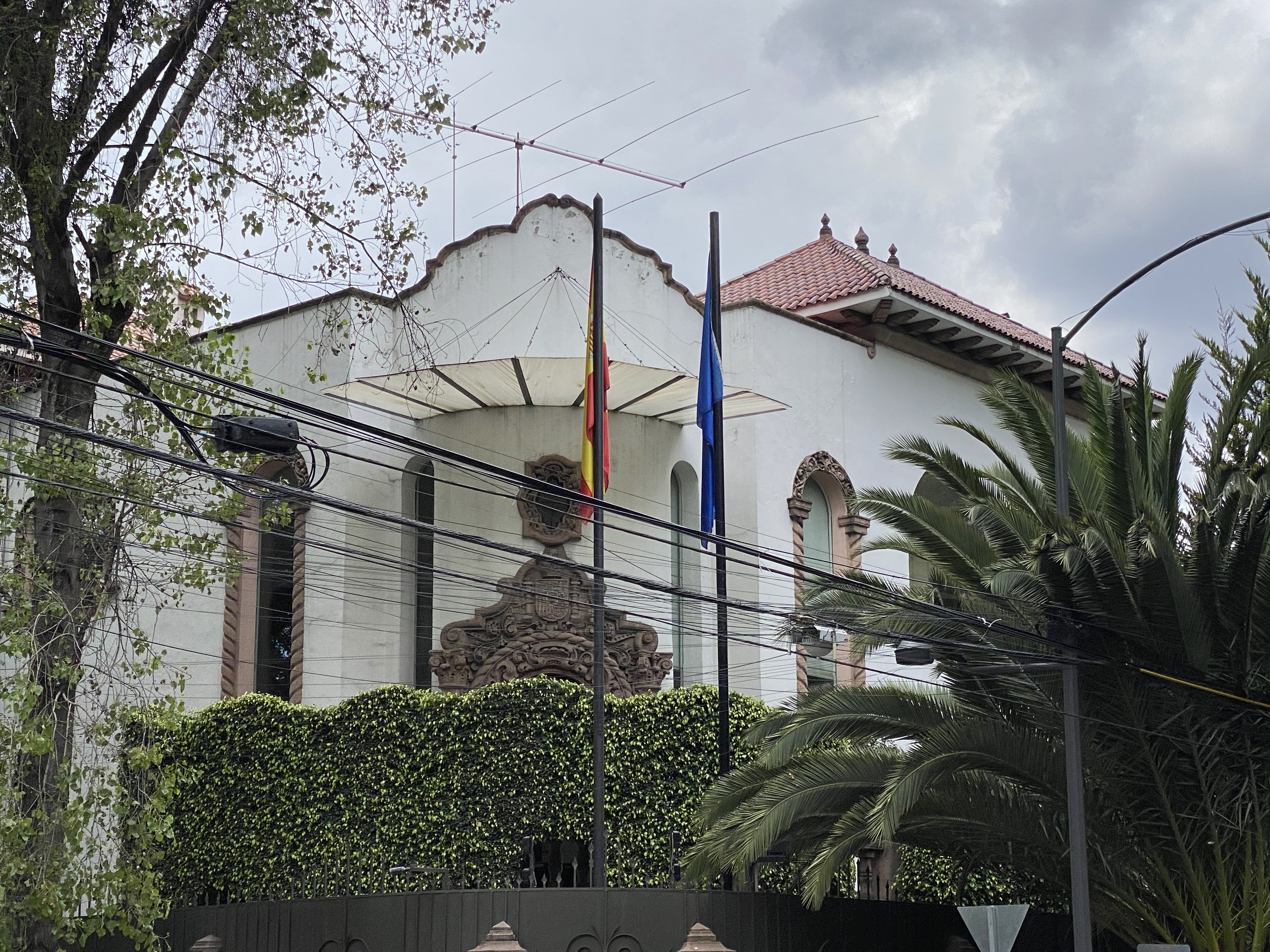
Embassy in Mexico City

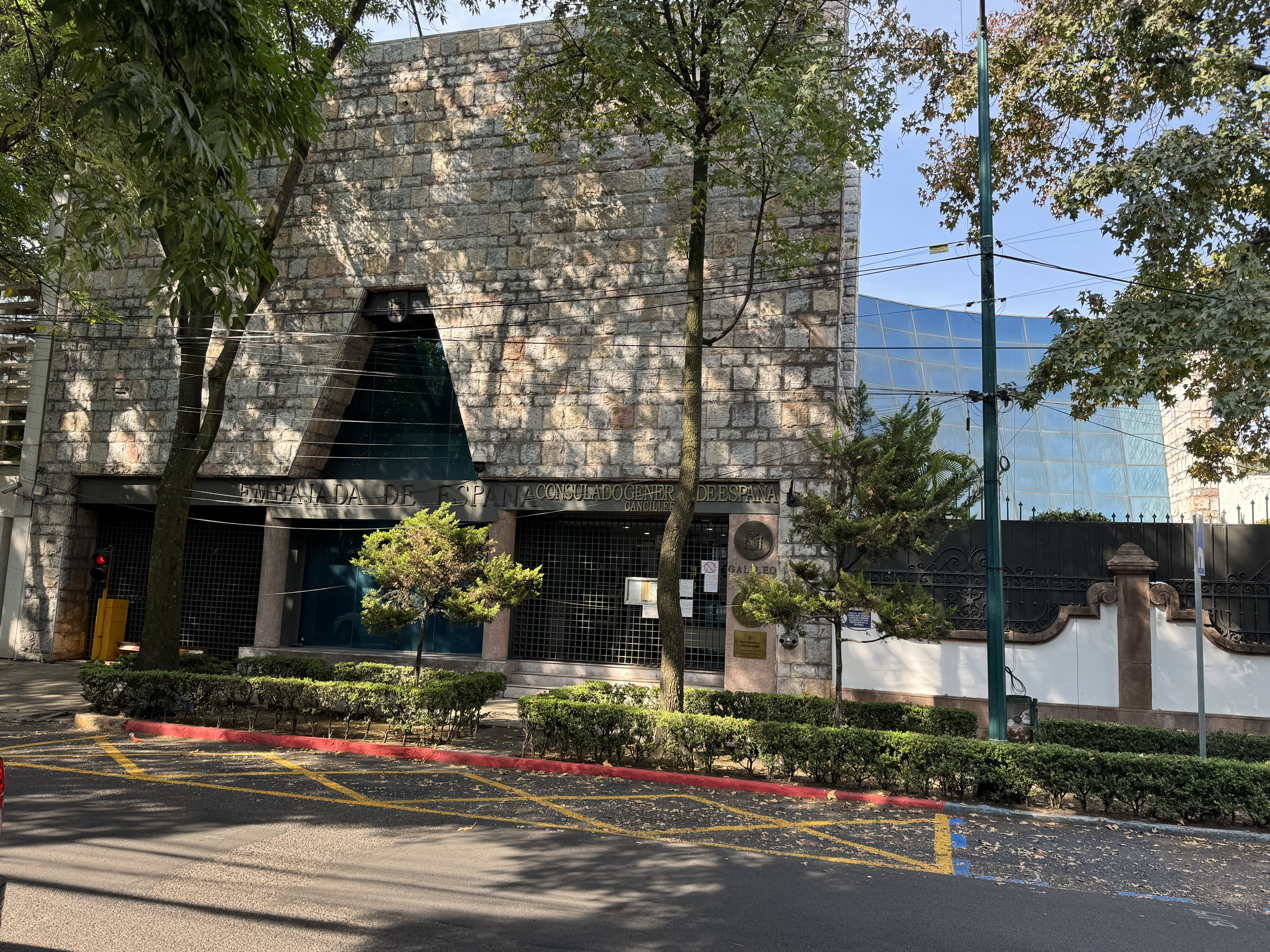
Consulate-General in Mexico City

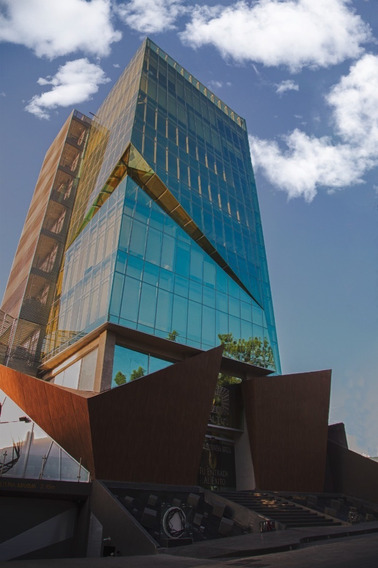
Building hosting the Consulate-General in Guadalajara

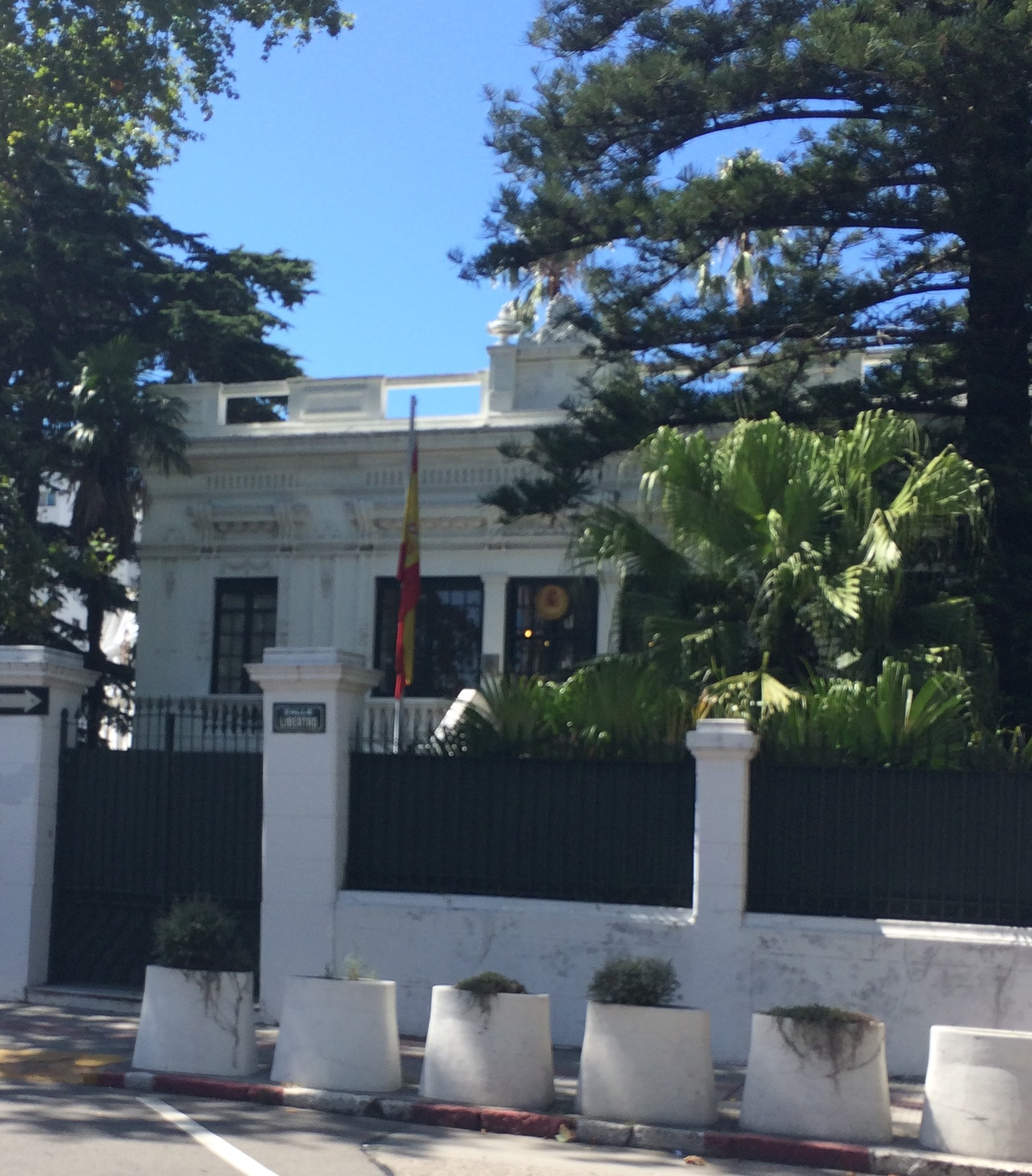
Embassy in Montevideo

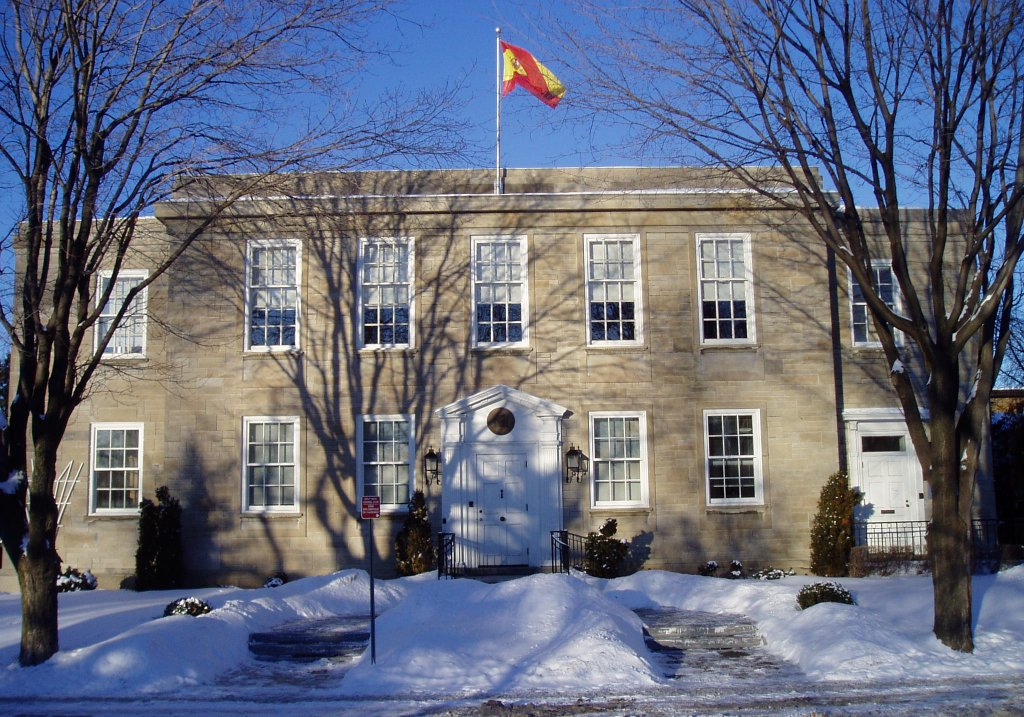
Embassy in Ottawa

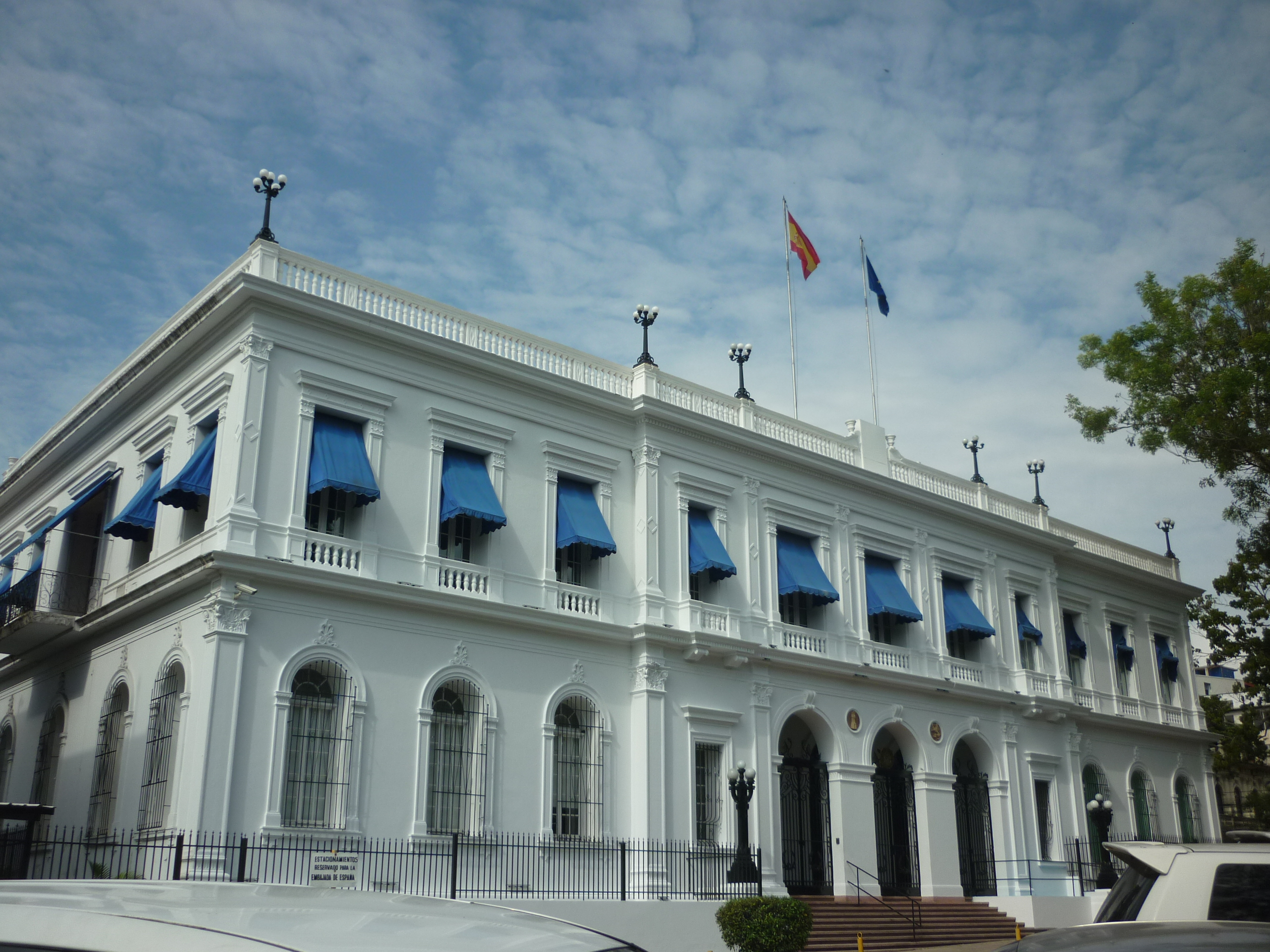
Embassy in Panama City

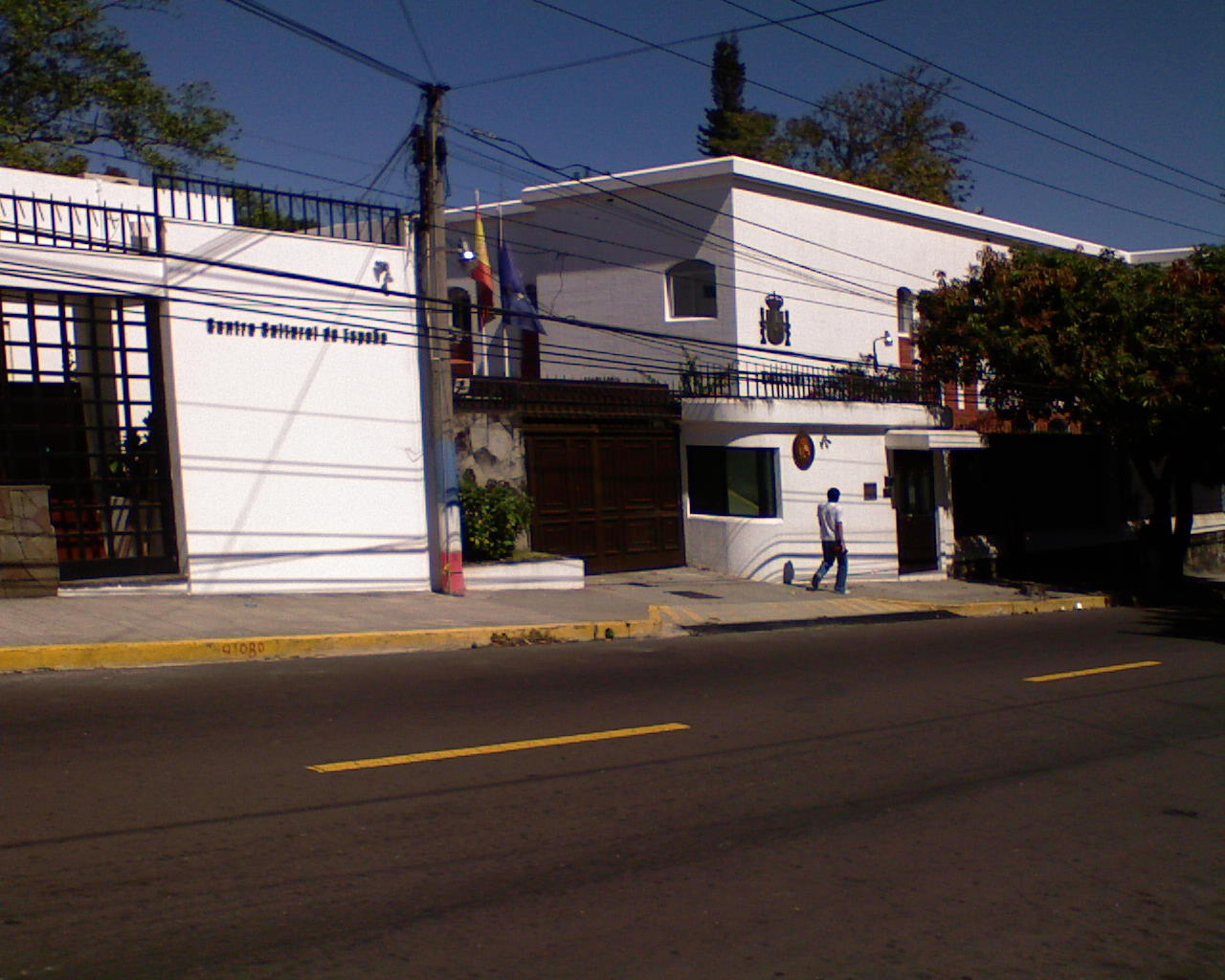
Embassy in San Salvador

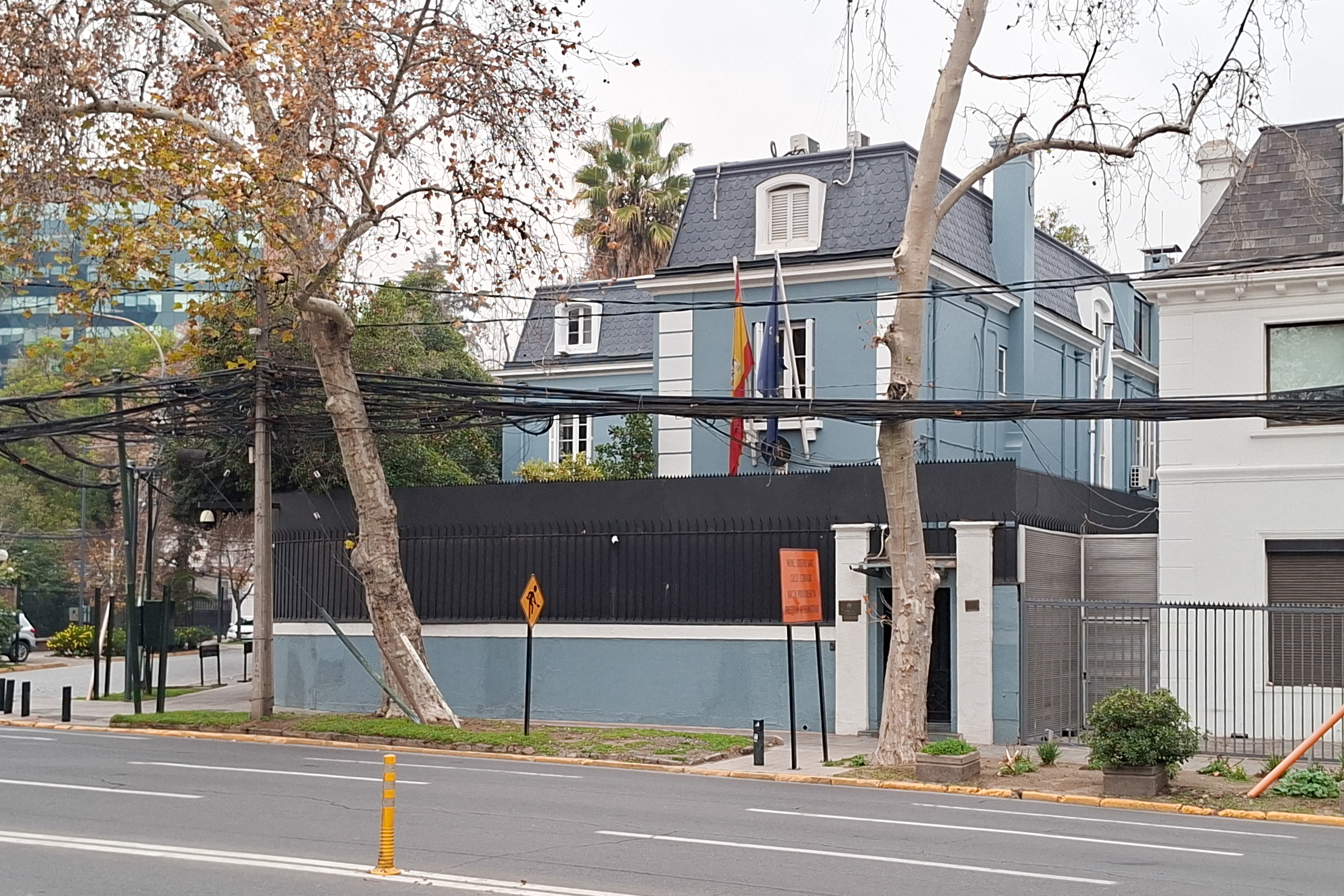
Embassy in Santiago

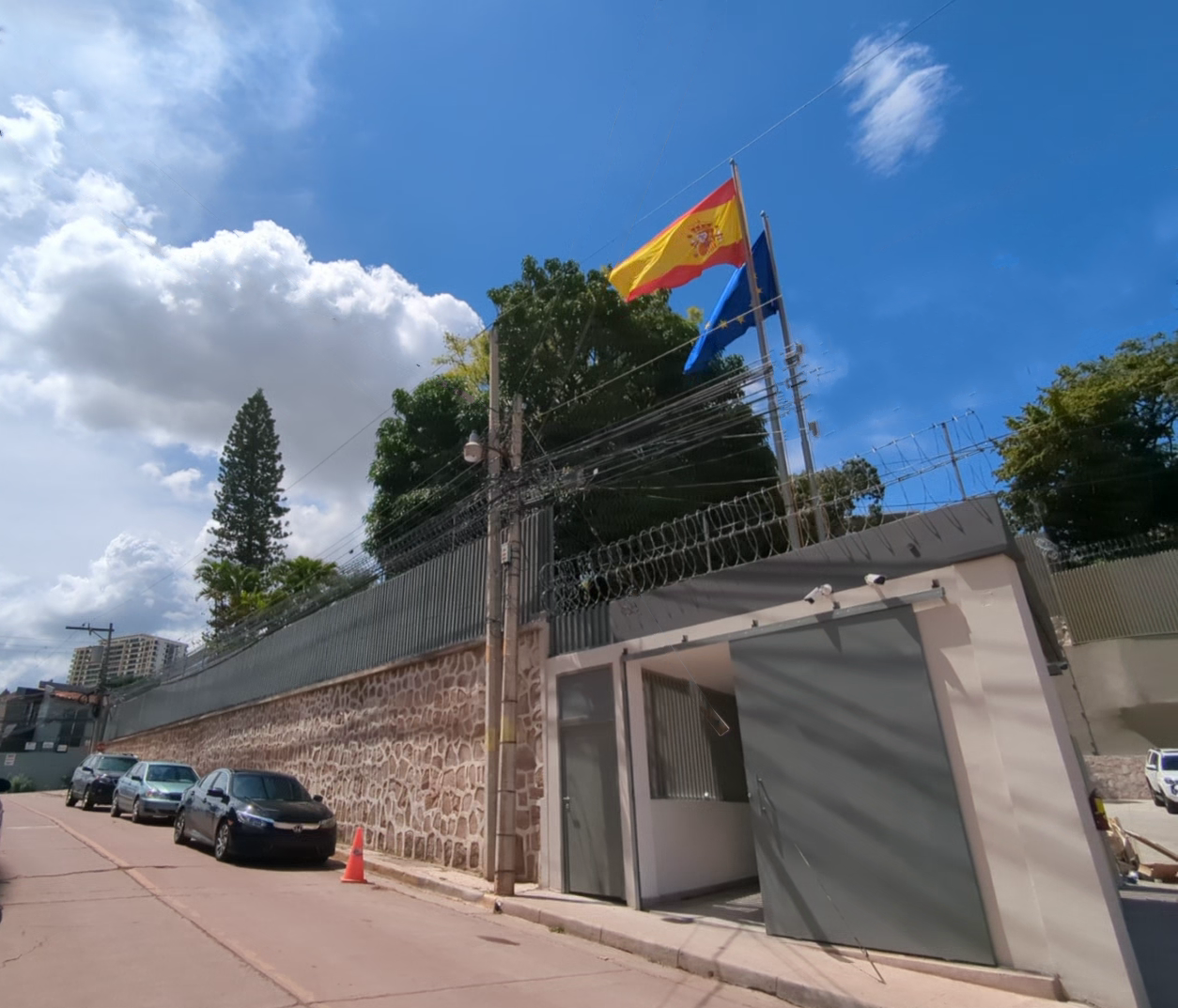
Embabassy in Tegucigalpa

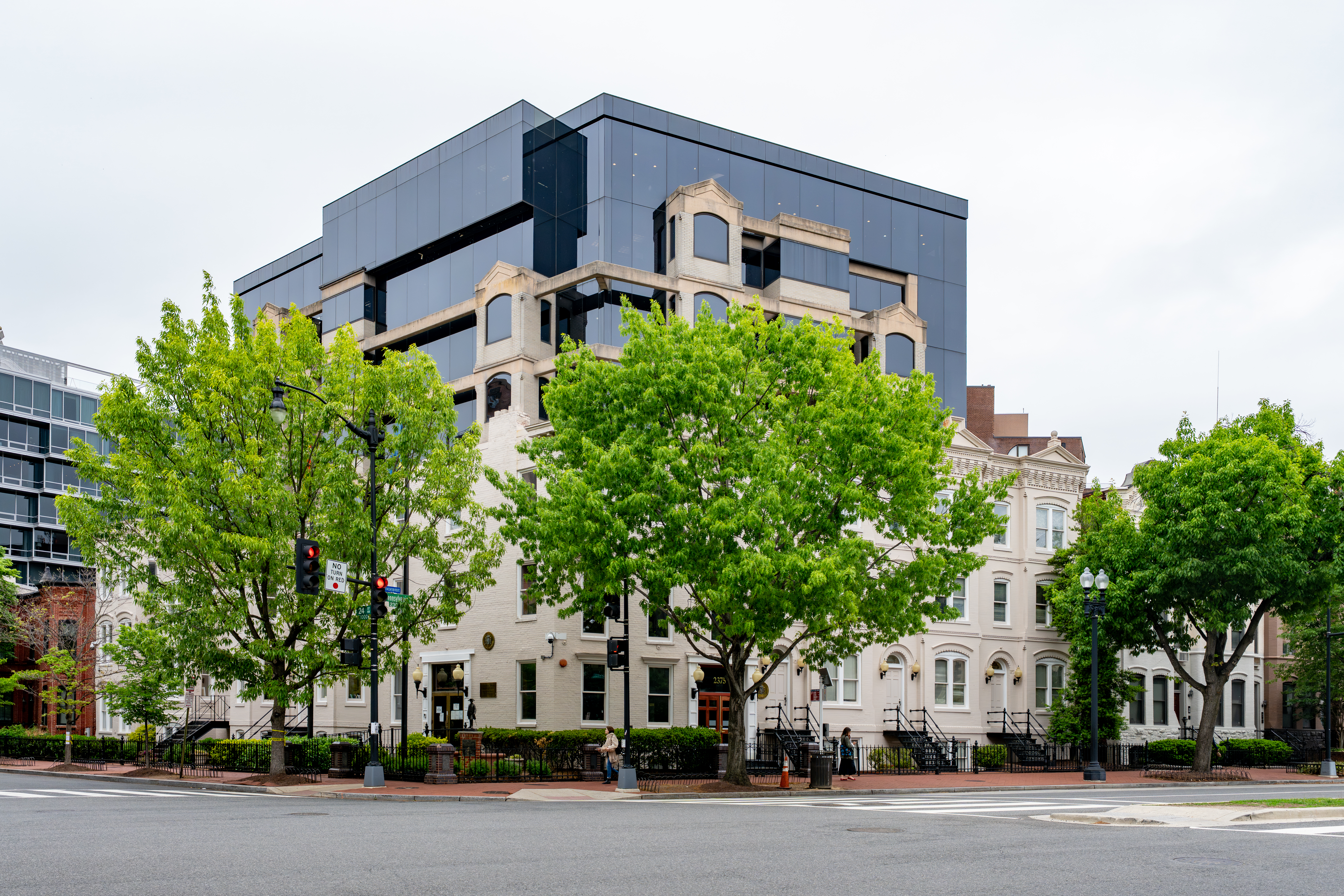
Embassy in Washington, D.C.

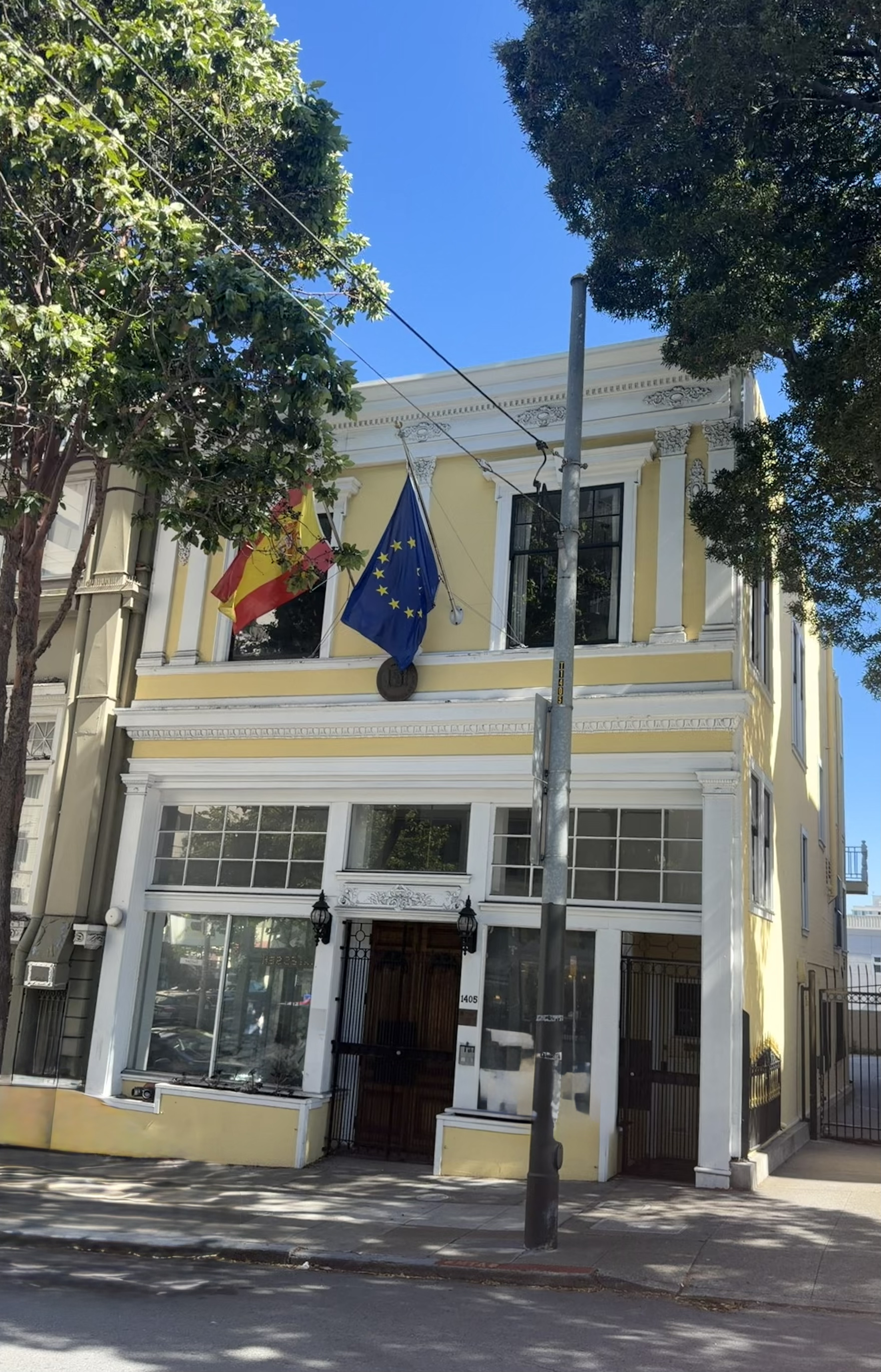
Consulate-General in San Francisco

=== Asia ===
Host country	Host city	Mission	Concurrent accreditation	Ref.
Armenia	Yerevan	Embassy office (Note: Subordinate to the embassy in Moscow, Russia.)		
Azerbaijan	Baku	Embassy office (Note: Subordinate to the embassy in Ankara, Turkey.)		
Bangladesh	Dhaka	Embassy		
China	Beijing	Embassy	Countries: Mongolia	
China	Beijing	Consulate-General	Countries: Mongolia	
China	Chengdu	Consulate-General	Countries: Mongolia	
China	Guangzhou	Consulate-General	Countries: Mongolia	
China	Hong Kong	Consulate-General	Countries: Mongolia	
China	Shanghai	Consulate-General	Countries: Mongolia	
Georgia	Tbilisi	Embassy office		
India	New Delhi	Embassy	Countries: Bhutan; Maldives; Nepal; Sri Lanka	
India	Mumbai	Consulate-General	Countries: Bhutan; Maldives; Nepal; Sri Lanka	
India	Bengaluru	Consulate-General	Countries: Bhutan; Maldives; Nepal; Sri Lanka	
Indonesia	Jakarta	Embassy	Countries: East Timor; International organizations: Association of Southeast Asian Nations (Note: Accredited as an observer mission)	
Iraq	Baghdad	Embassy		
Iran	Tehran	Embassy		
Israel	Tel Aviv	Embassy		
Japan	Tokyo	Embassy		
Jordan	Amman	Embassy		
Kazakhstan	Astana	Embassy	Countries: Kyrgyzstan; Tajikistan	
Kuwait	Kuwait City	Embassy	Countries: Bahrain	
Lebanon	Beirut	Embassy		
Malaysia	Kuala Lumpur	Embassy		
Myanmar	Yangon	Embassy office (Note: Subordinate to the embassy in Bangkok, Thailand.)		
Oman	Muscat	Embassy		
Pakistan	Islamabad	Embassy		
Palestine	Jerusalem	Consulate-General (Note: Although officially titled as a consular mission in Jerusalem, it is physically located in Sheikh Jarrah, East Jerusalem, and is accredited to the territories that comprise the State of Palestine: the West Bank and the Gaza Strip.)		
Philippines	Manila	Embassy	Countries: Marshall Islands; Micronesia; Palau	
Philippines	Manila	Consulate-General	Countries: Marshall Islands; Micronesia; Palau	
Qatar	Doha	Embassy		
Republic of China (Taiwan)	Taipei	Chamber of Commerce		
Saudi Arabia	Riyadh	Embassy		
Singapore	Singapore	Embassy		
South Korea	Seoul	Embassy	Countries: North Korea	
Syria	Damascus	Embassy		
Thailand	Bangkok	Embassy	Countries: Cambodia; Laos; Myanmar	
Turkey	Ankara	Embassy	Countries: Azerbaijan; Georgia	
Turkey	Istanbul	Consulate-General	Countries: Azerbaijan; Georgia	
United Arab Emirates	Abu Dhabi	Embassy		
Vietnam	Hanoi	Embassy		

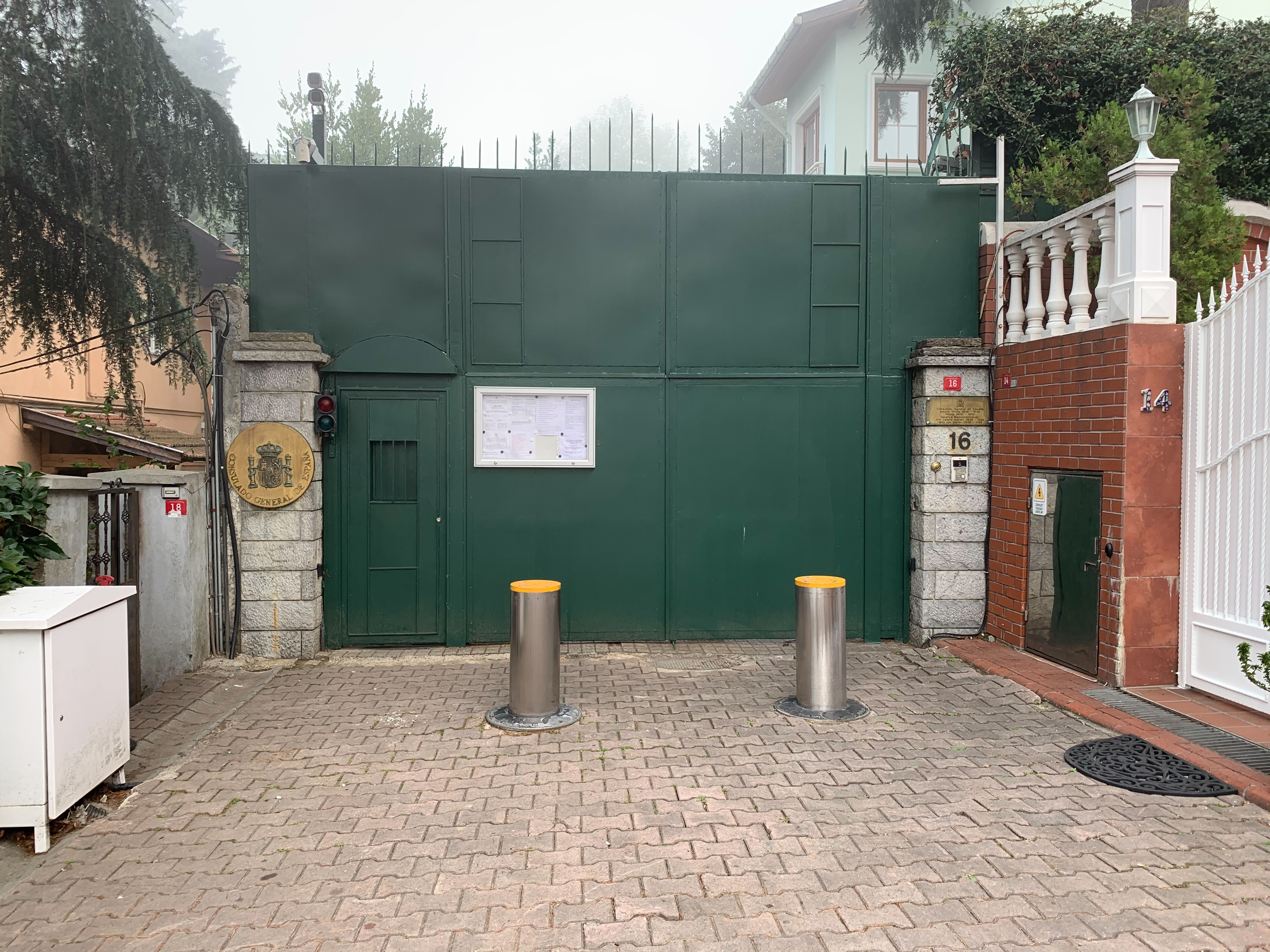
Consulate-General in Istanbul

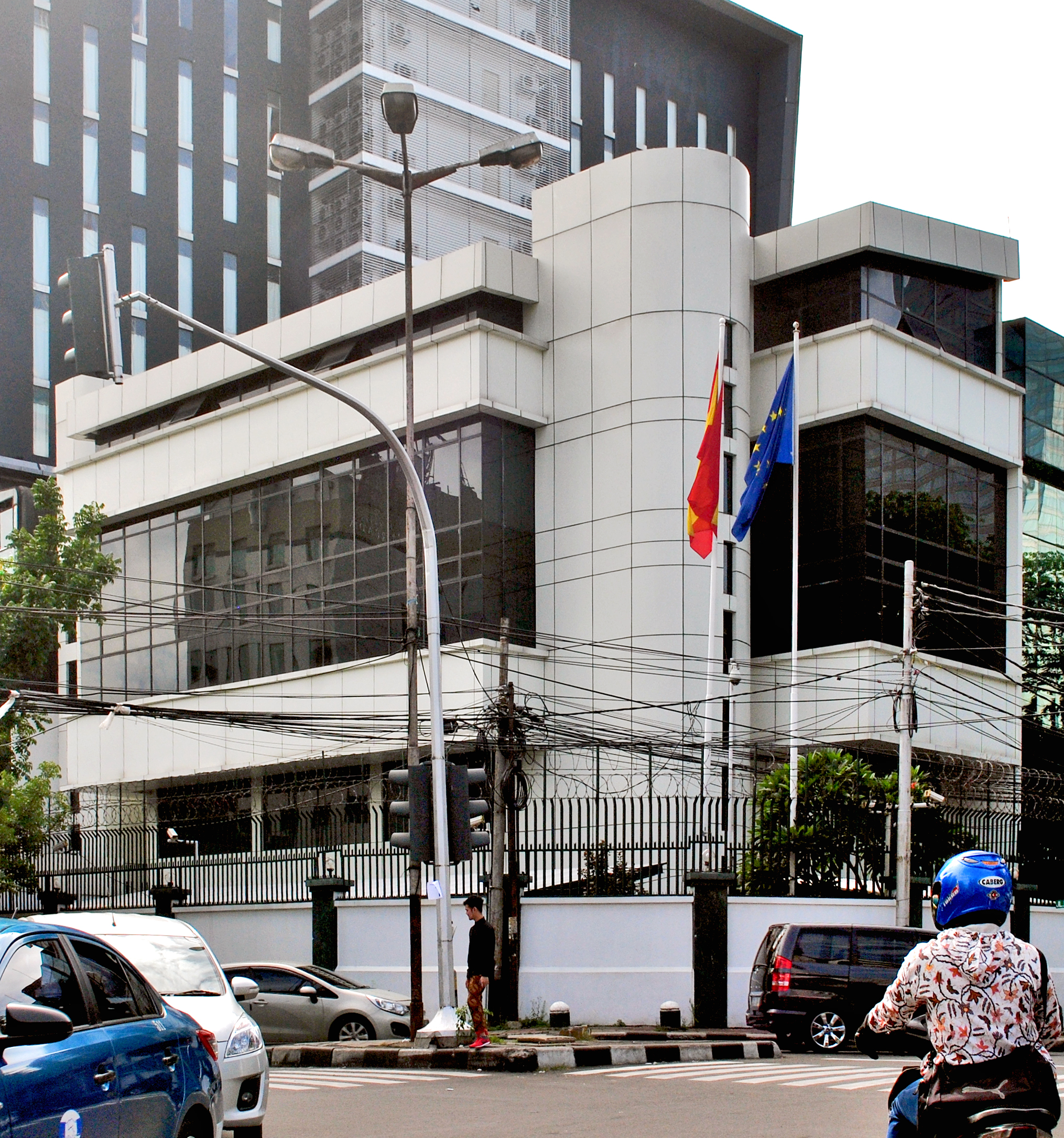
Embassy in Jakarta

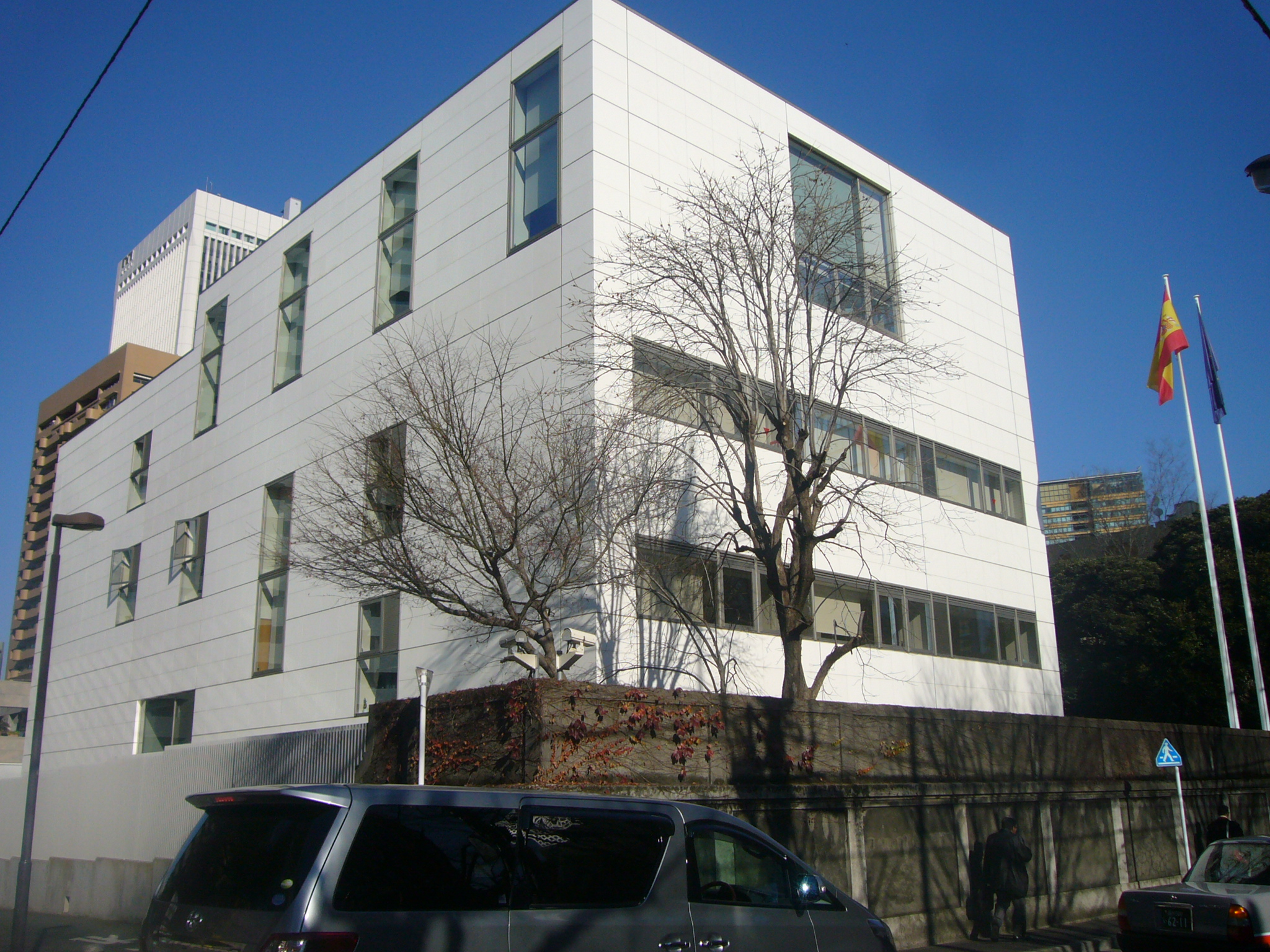
Embassy in Tokyo

=== Europe ===
Host country	Host city	Mission	Concurrent accreditation	Ref.
Albania	Tirana	Embassy		
Andorra	Andorra la Vella	Embassy		
Andorra	Andorra la Vella	Consulate-General		
Austria	Vienna	Embassy		
Belgium	Brussels	Embassy		
Belgium	Brussels	Consulate-General		
Bosnia and Herzegovina	Sarajevo	Embassy		
Bulgaria	Sofia	Embassy		
Croatia	Zagreb	Embassy		
Cyprus	Nicosia	Embassy		
Czech Republic	Prague	Embassy		
Denmark	Copenhagen	Embassy		
Estonia	Tallinn	Embassy		
Finland	Helsinki	Embassy		
France	Paris	Embassy	Countries: Monaco	
France	Paris	Consulate-General	Countries: Monaco	
France	Bayonne	Consulate-General	Countries: Monaco	
France	Bordeaux	Consulate-General	Countries: Monaco	
France	Lyon	Consulate-General	Countries: Monaco	
France	Marseille	Consulate-General	Countries: Monaco	
France	Montpellier	Consulate-General	Countries: Monaco	
France	Pau	Consulate-General	Countries: Monaco	
France	Perpignan	Consulate-General	Countries: Monaco	
France	Strasbourg	Consulate-General	Countries: Monaco	
France	Toulouse	Consulate-General	Countries: Monaco	
Germany	Berlin	Embassy		
Germany	Düsseldorf	Consulate-General		
Germany	Frankfurt	Consulate-General		
Germany	Hamburg	Consulate-General		
Germany	Munich	Consulate-General		
Germany	Stuttgart	Consulate-General		
Greece	Athens	Embassy		
Holy See	Rome	Embassy (Note: The Spanish Embassy to the Holy See is located outside Vatican territory in Rome.)	Sovereign entity: Sovereign Military Order of Malta	
Hungary	Budapest	Embassy		
Ireland	Dublin	Embassy		
Italy	Rome	Embassy	Countries: San Marino; International organizations: Food and Agriculture Organization; International Fund for Agricultural Development; World Food Programme	
Italy	Rome	Consulate-General	Countries: San Marino; International organizations: Food and Agriculture Organization; International Fund for Agricultural Development; World Food Programme	
Italy	Milan	Consulate-General	Countries: San Marino; International organizations: Food and Agriculture Organization; International Fund for Agricultural Development; World Food Programme	
Italy	Naples	Consulate-General	Countries: San Marino; International organizations: Food and Agriculture Organization; International Fund for Agricultural Development; World Food Programme	
Latvia	Riga	Embassy		
Lithuania	Vilnius	Embassy		
Luxembourg	Luxembourg	Embassy		
Malta	Valletta	Embassy		
Montenegro	Podgorica	Embassy office		
Netherlands	The Hague	Embassy		
Netherlands	Amsterdam	Consulate-General		
North Macedonia	Skopje	Embassy		
Norway	Oslo	Embassy	Countries: Iceland	
Poland	Warsaw	Embassy		
Portugal	Lisbon	Embassy		
Portugal	Lisbon	Consulate-General		
Portugal	Porto	Consulate-General		
Romania	Bucharest	Embassy	Countries: Moldova	
Russia	Moscow	Embassy	Countries: Belarus; Armenia; Turkmenistan; Uzbekistan	
Russia	Moscow	Consulate-General	Countries: Belarus; Armenia; Turkmenistan; Uzbekistan	
Russia	Saint Petersburg	Consulate-General	Countries: Belarus; Armenia; Turkmenistan; Uzbekistan	
Serbia	Belgrade	Embassy	Countries: Montenegro	
Slovakia	Bratislava	Embassy		
Slovenia	Ljubljana	Embassy		
Sweden	Stockholm	Embassy		
Switzerland	Bern	Embassy	Countries: Liechtenstein	
Switzerland	Bern	Consulate-General	Countries: Liechtenstein	
Switzerland	Geneva	Consulate-General	Countries: Liechtenstein	
Switzerland	Zürich	Consulate-General	Countries: Liechtenstein	
Ukraine	Kyiv	Embassy		
United Kingdom	London	Embassy		
United Kingdom	London	Consulate-General		
United Kingdom	Edinburgh	Consulate-General		
United Kingdom	Manchester	Consulate-General		

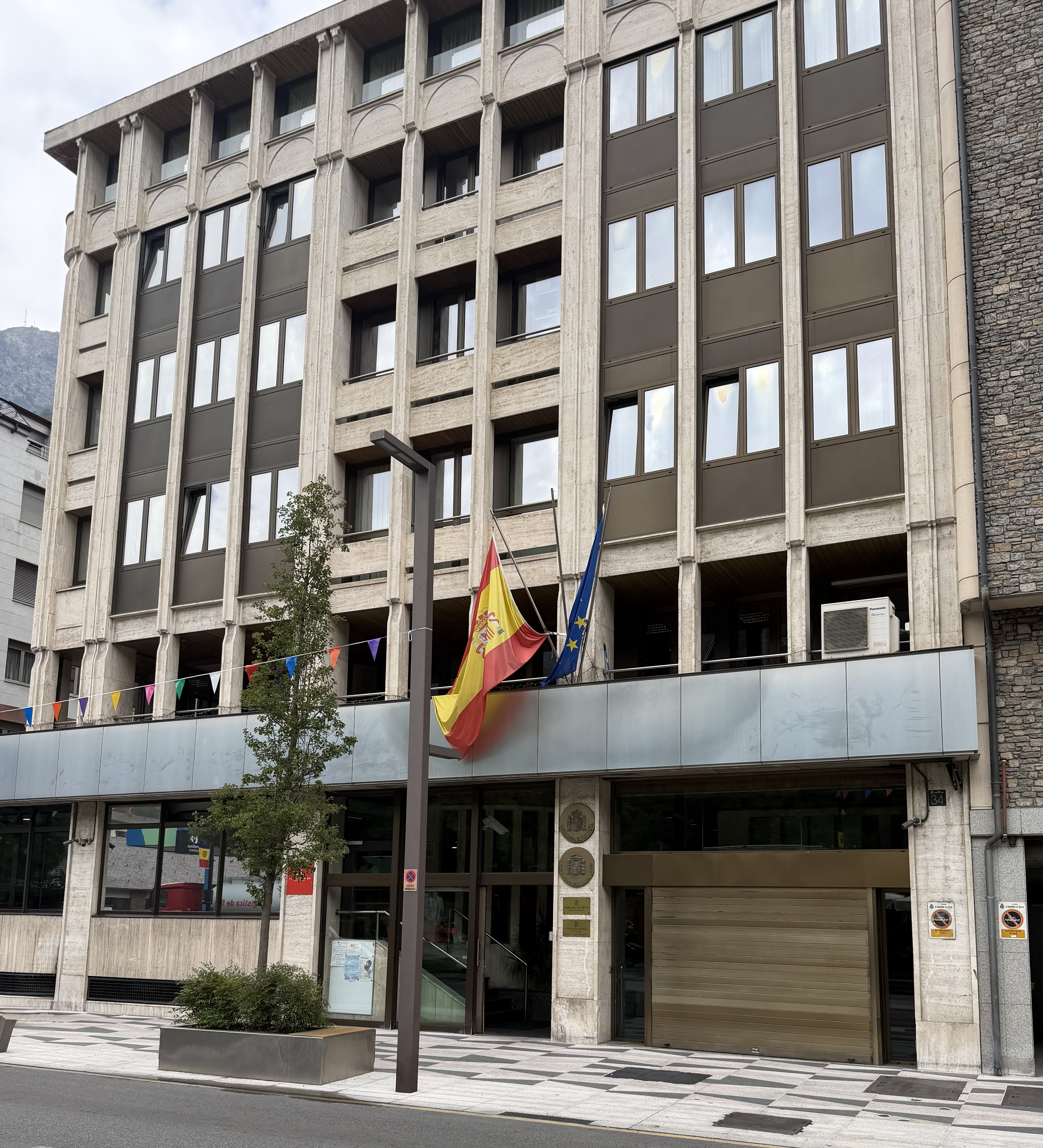
Embassy in Andorra la Vella

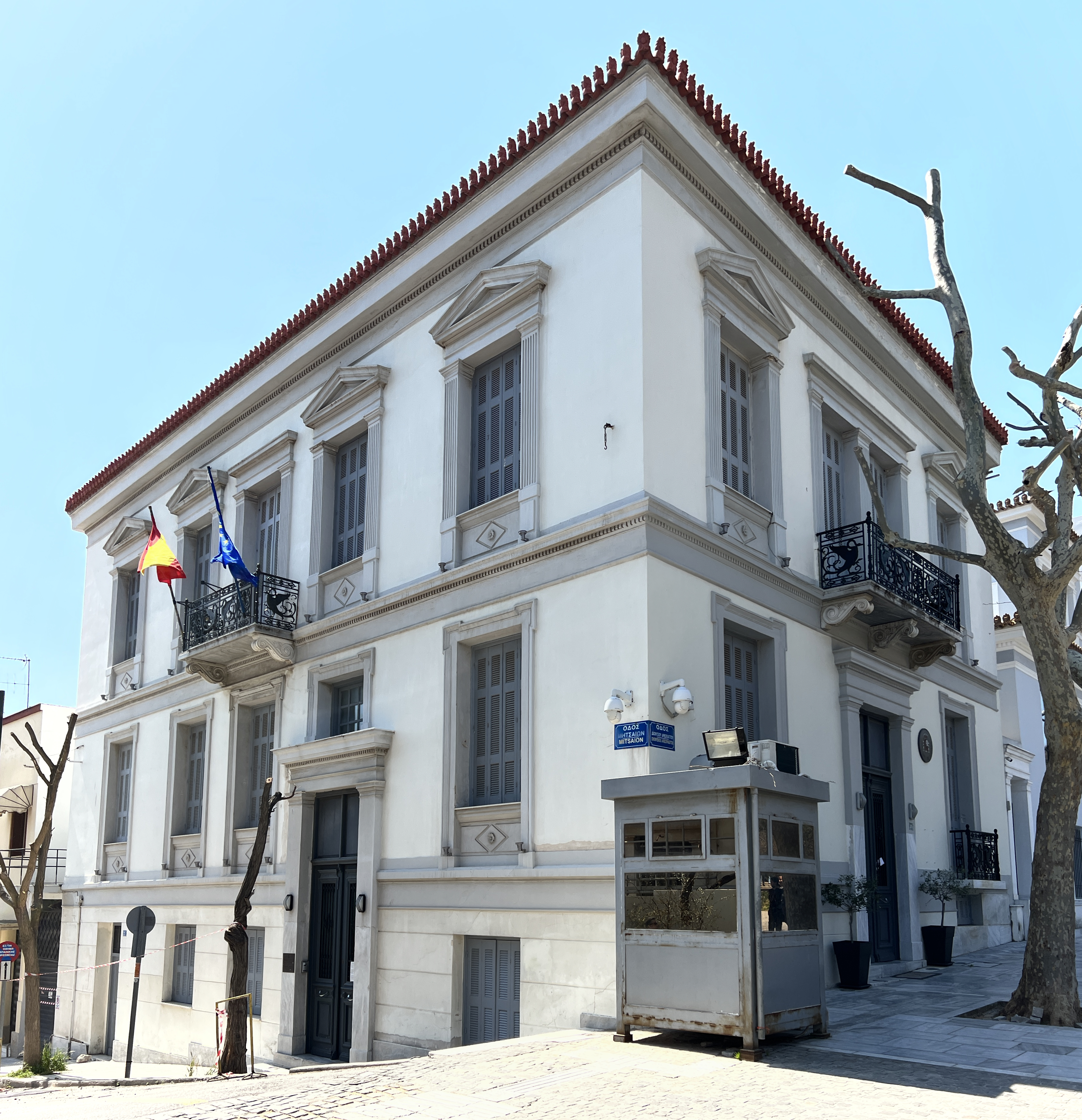
Embassy in Athens

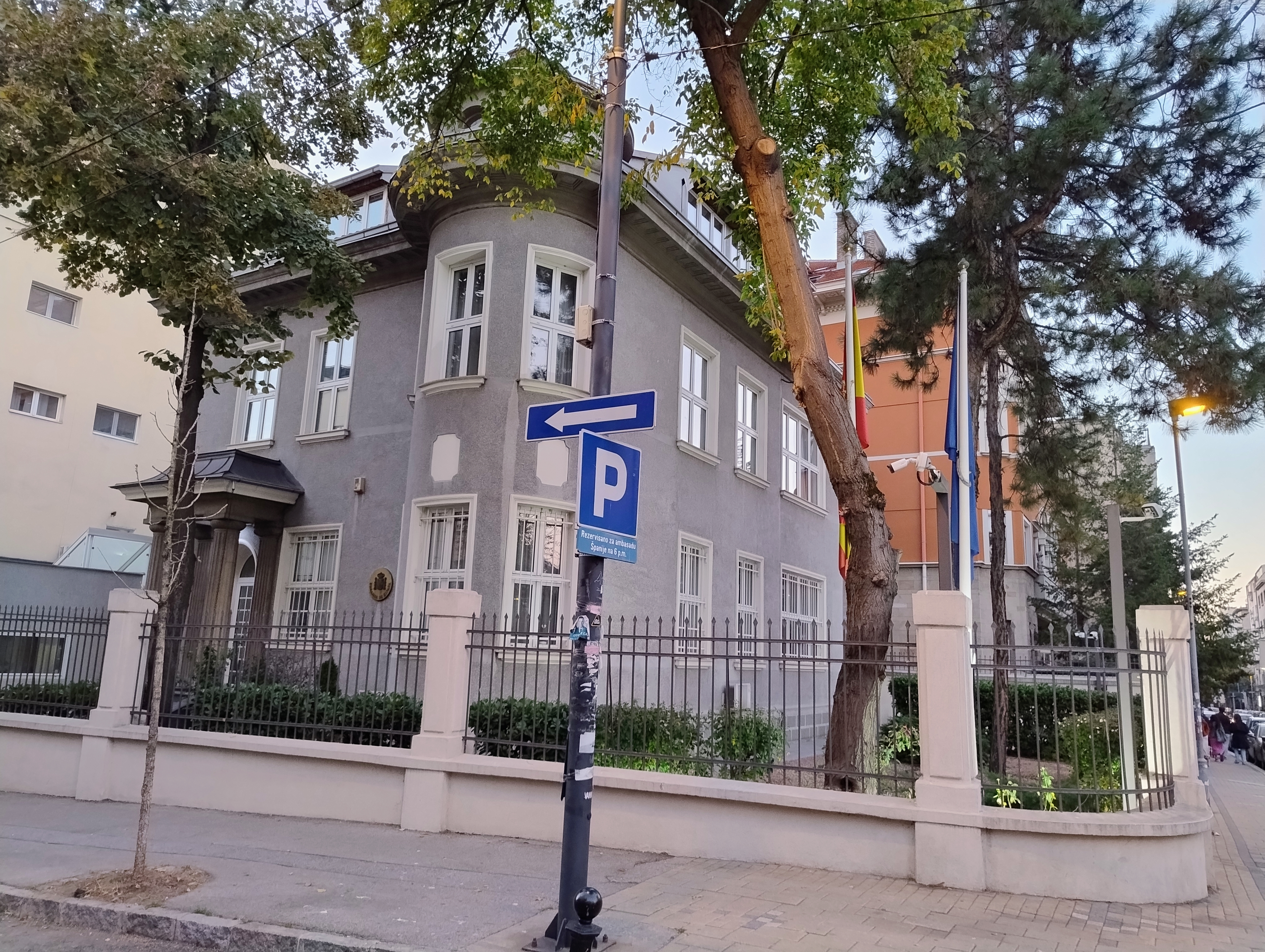
Embassy in Belgrade

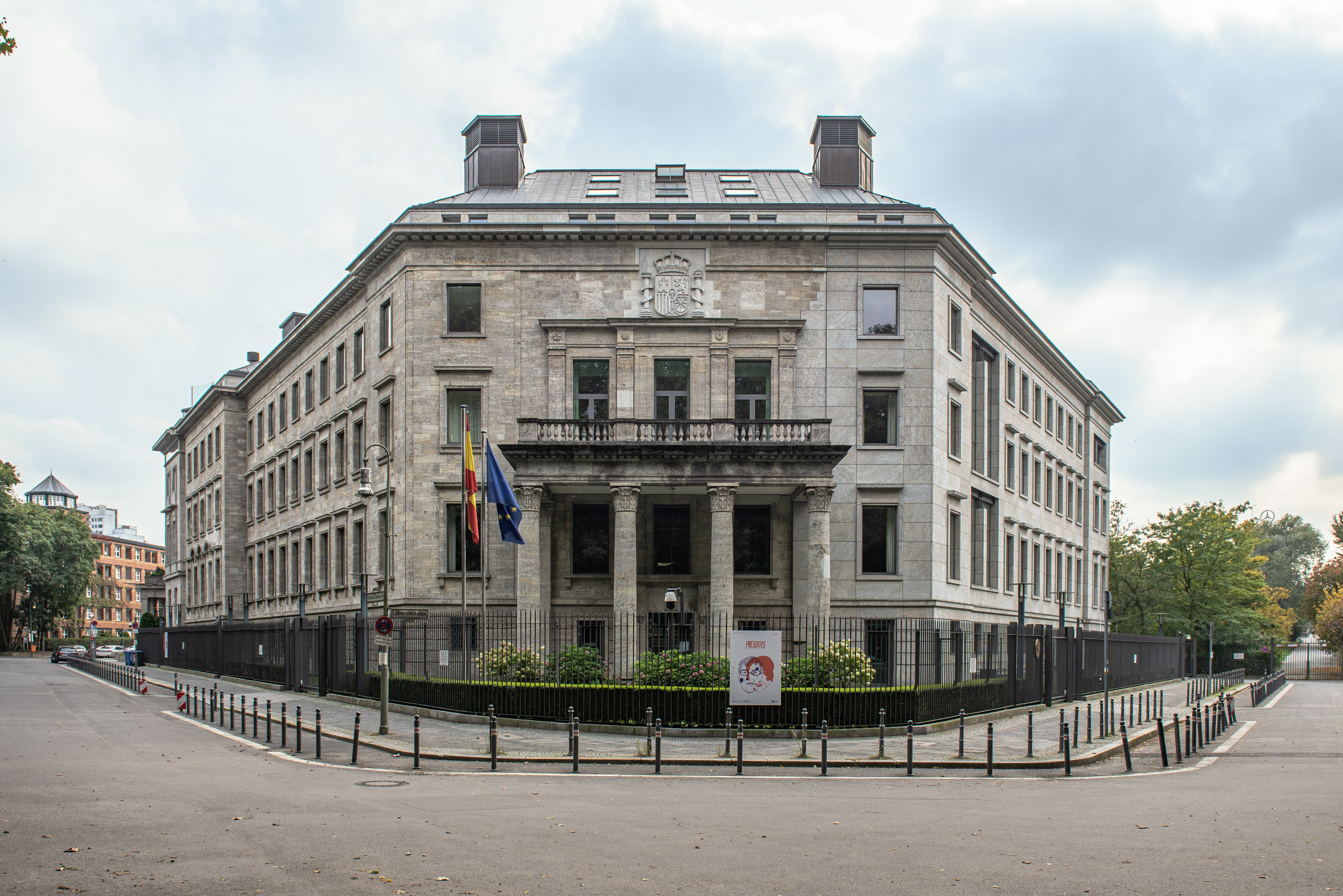
Embassy in Berlin

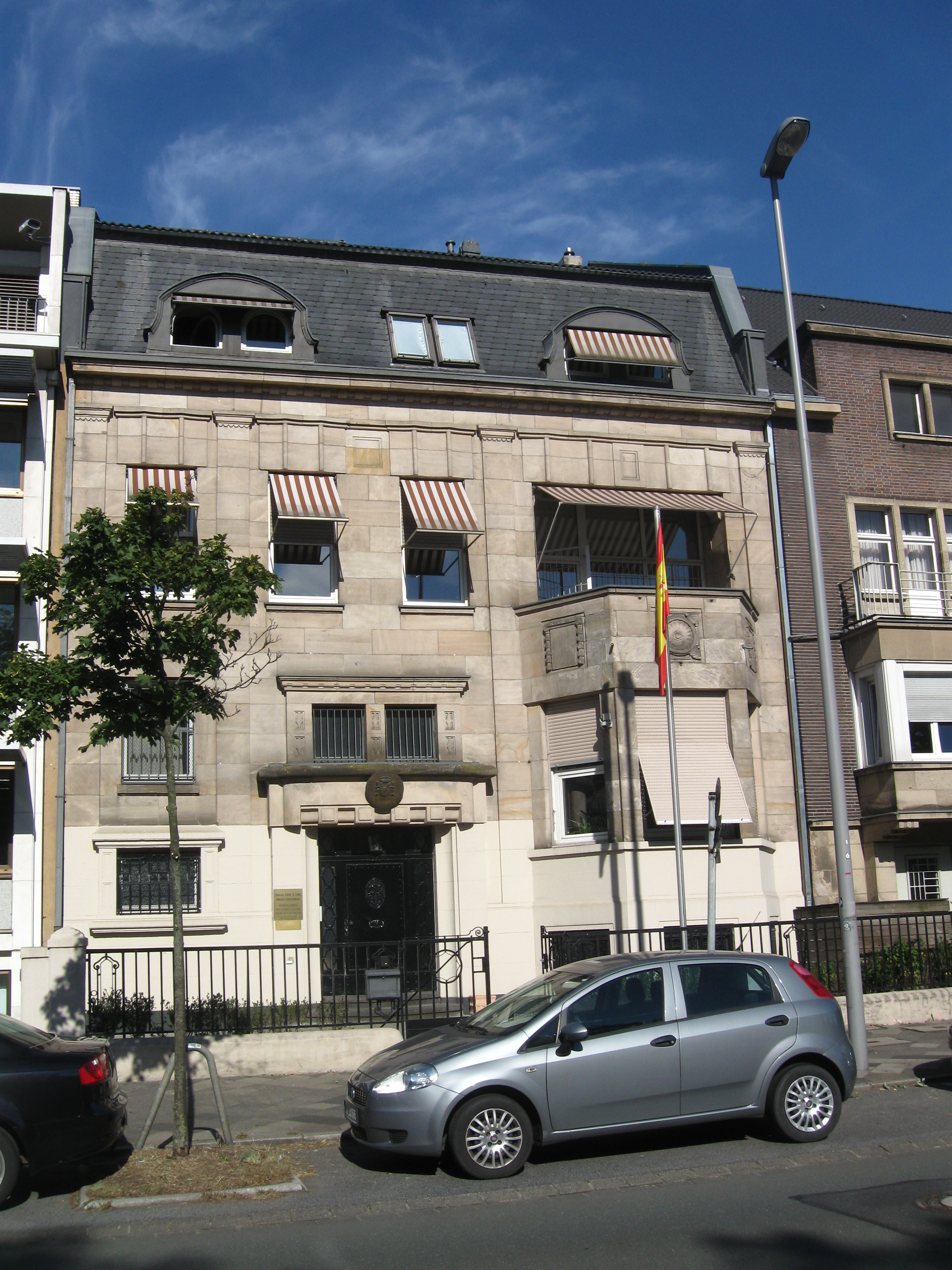
Consulate-General in Düsseldorf

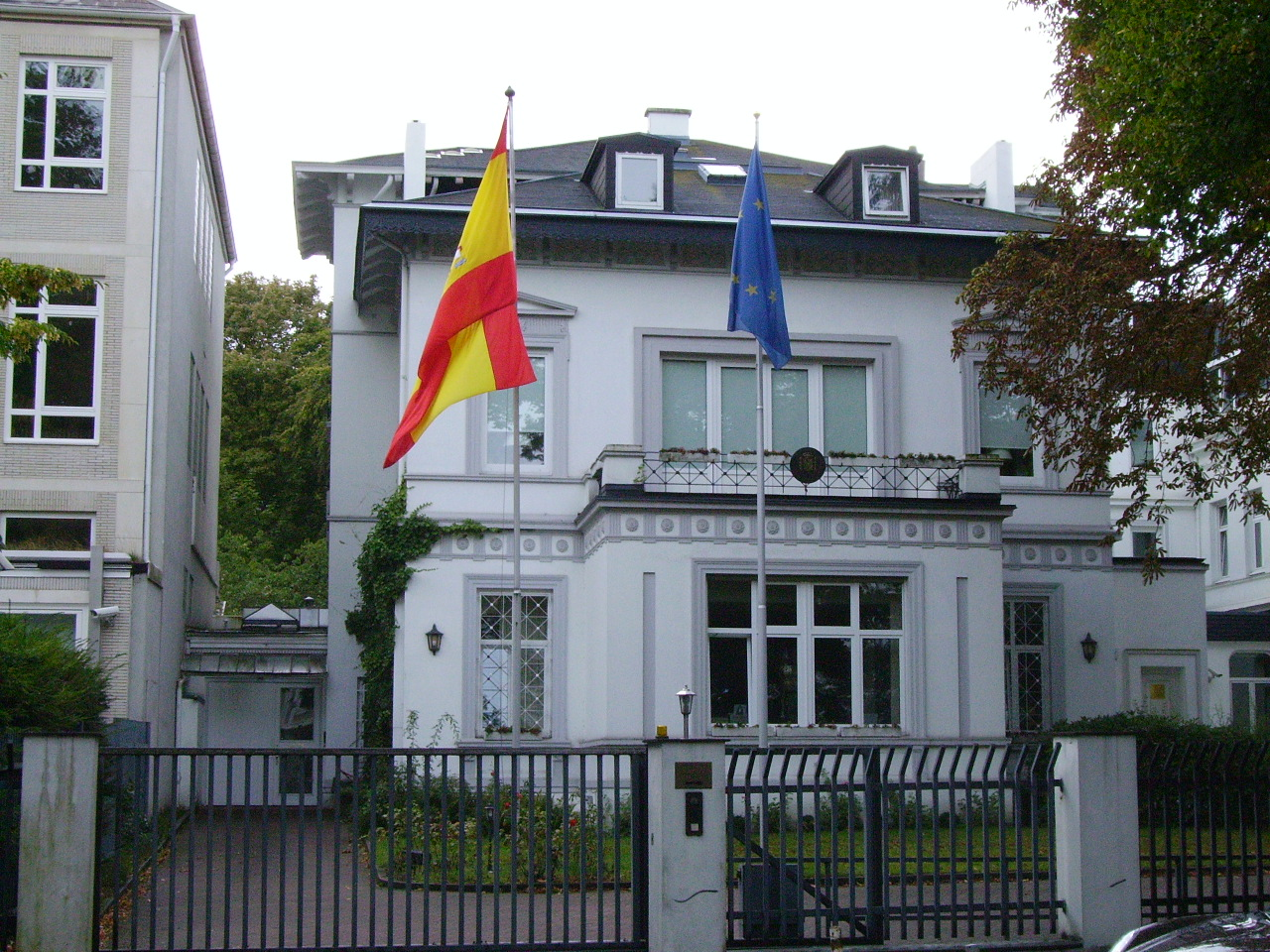
Consulate-General in Hamburg

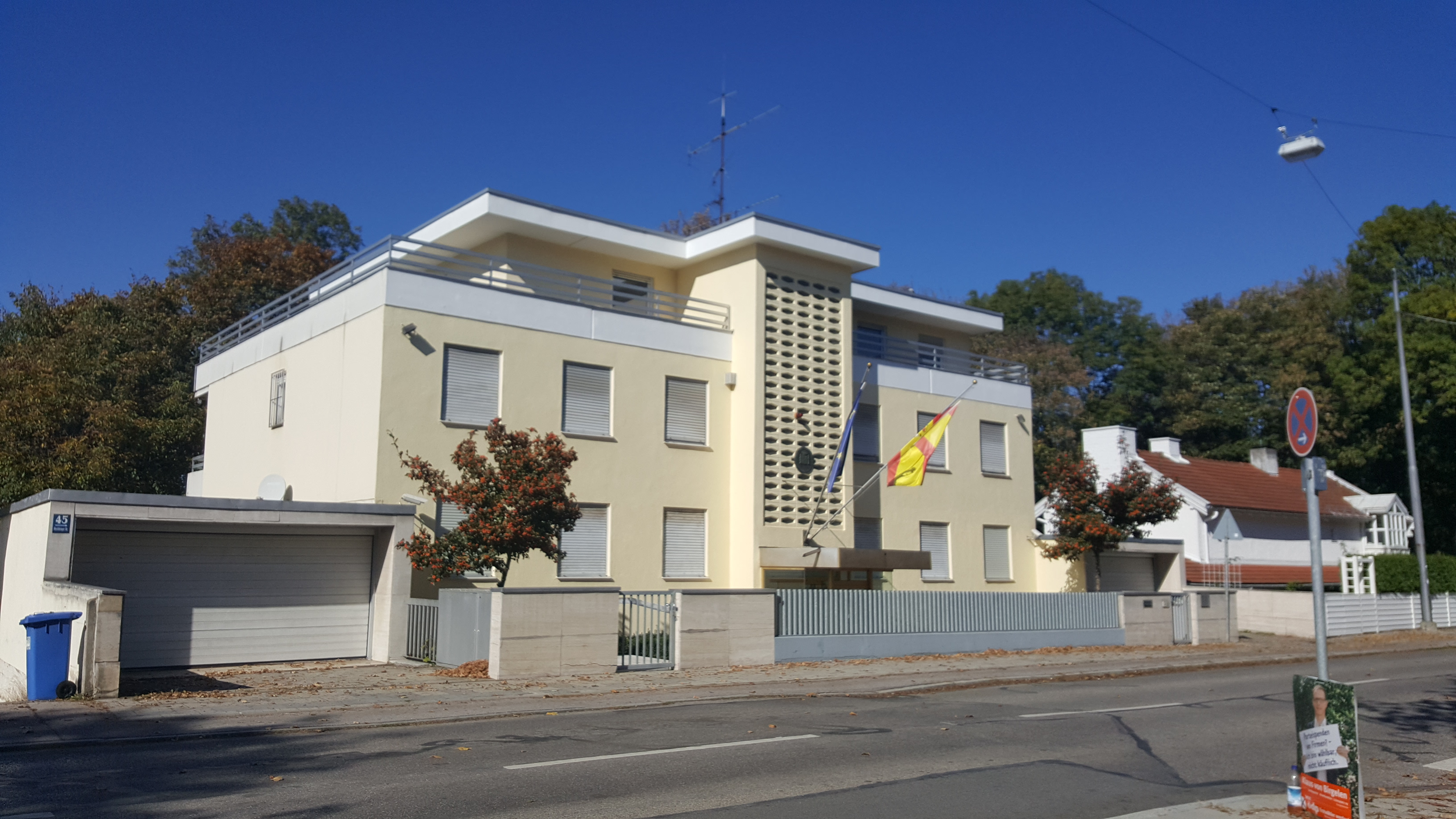
Consulate-General in Munich

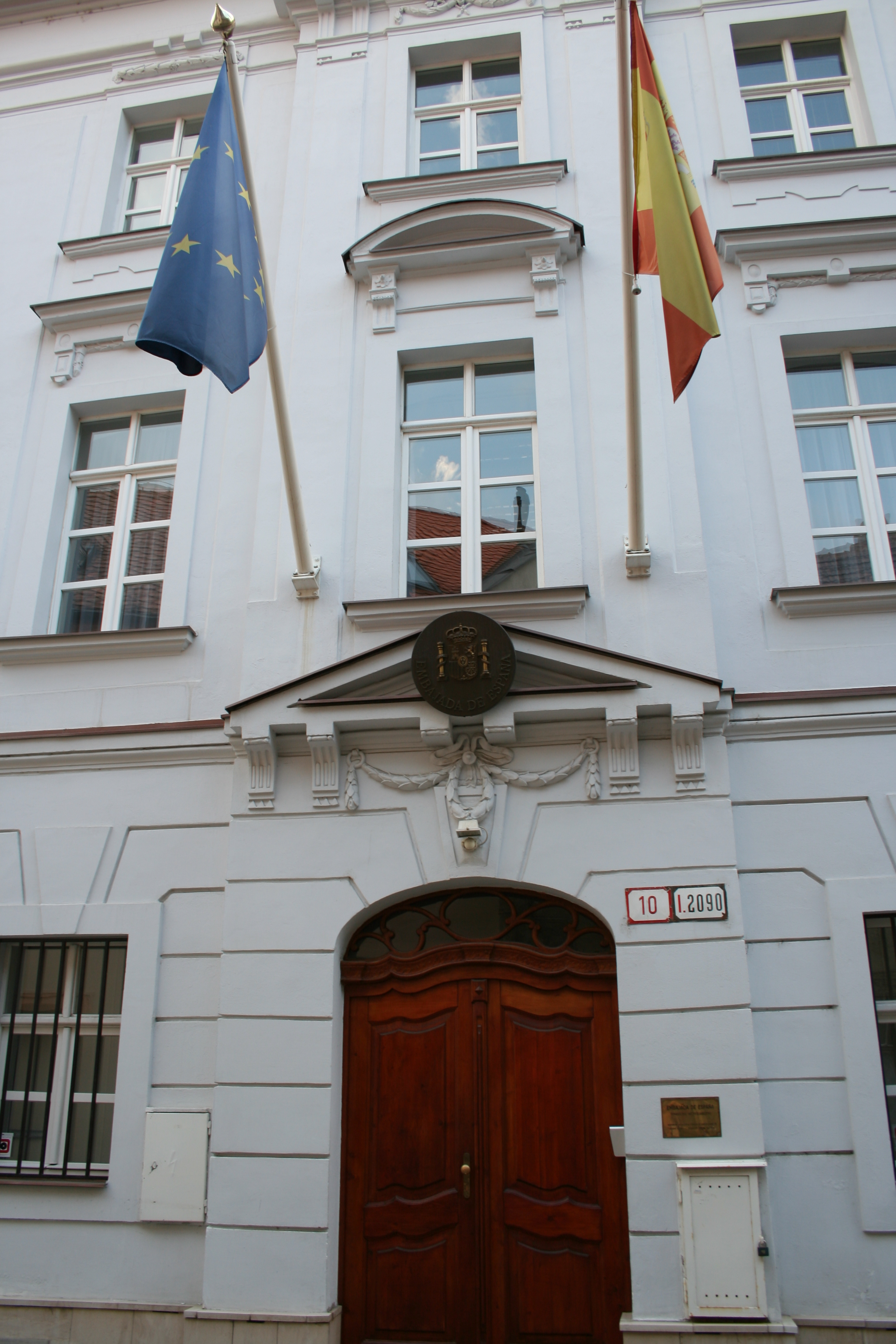
Embassy in Bratislava

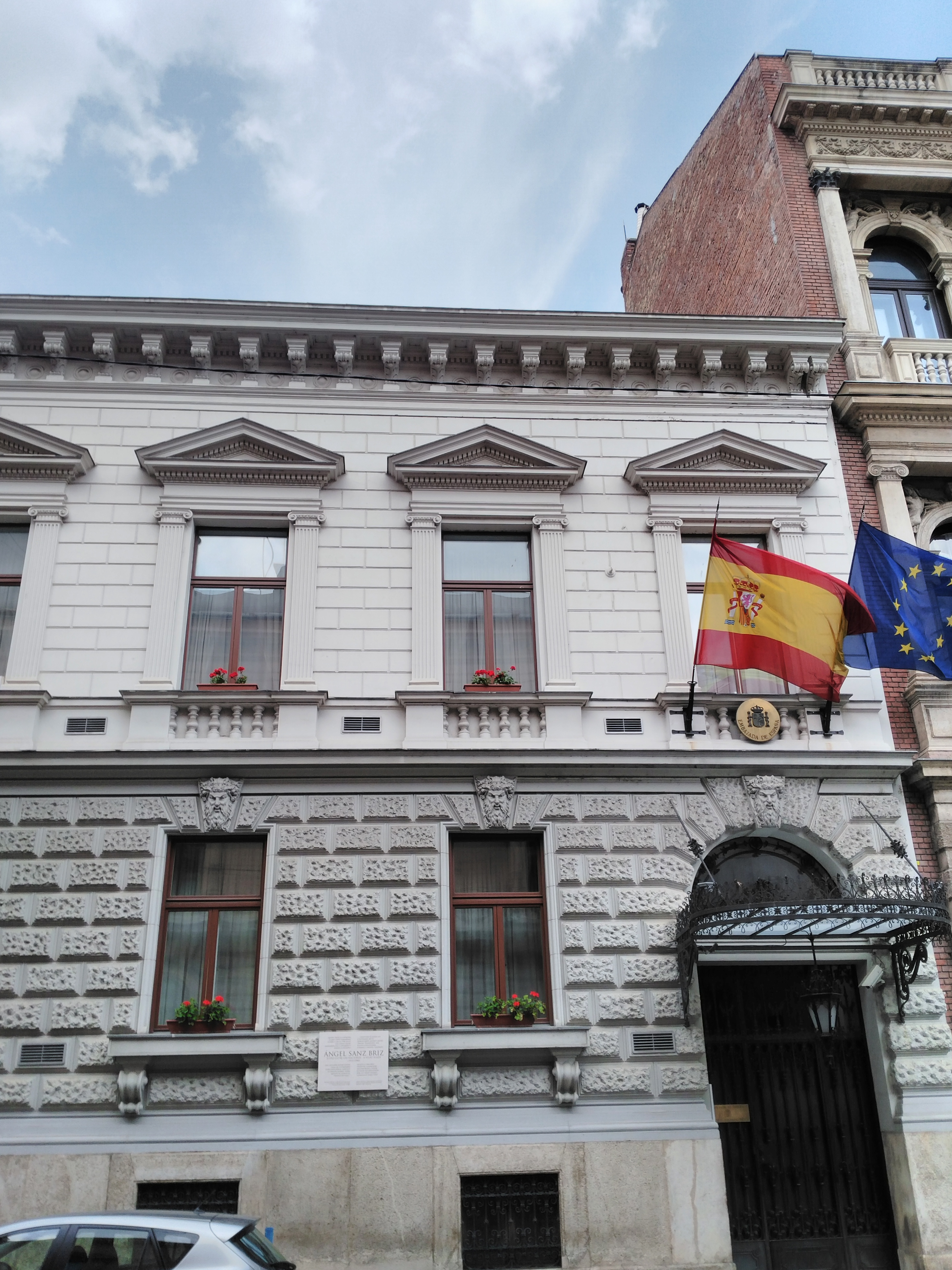
Embassy in Budapest

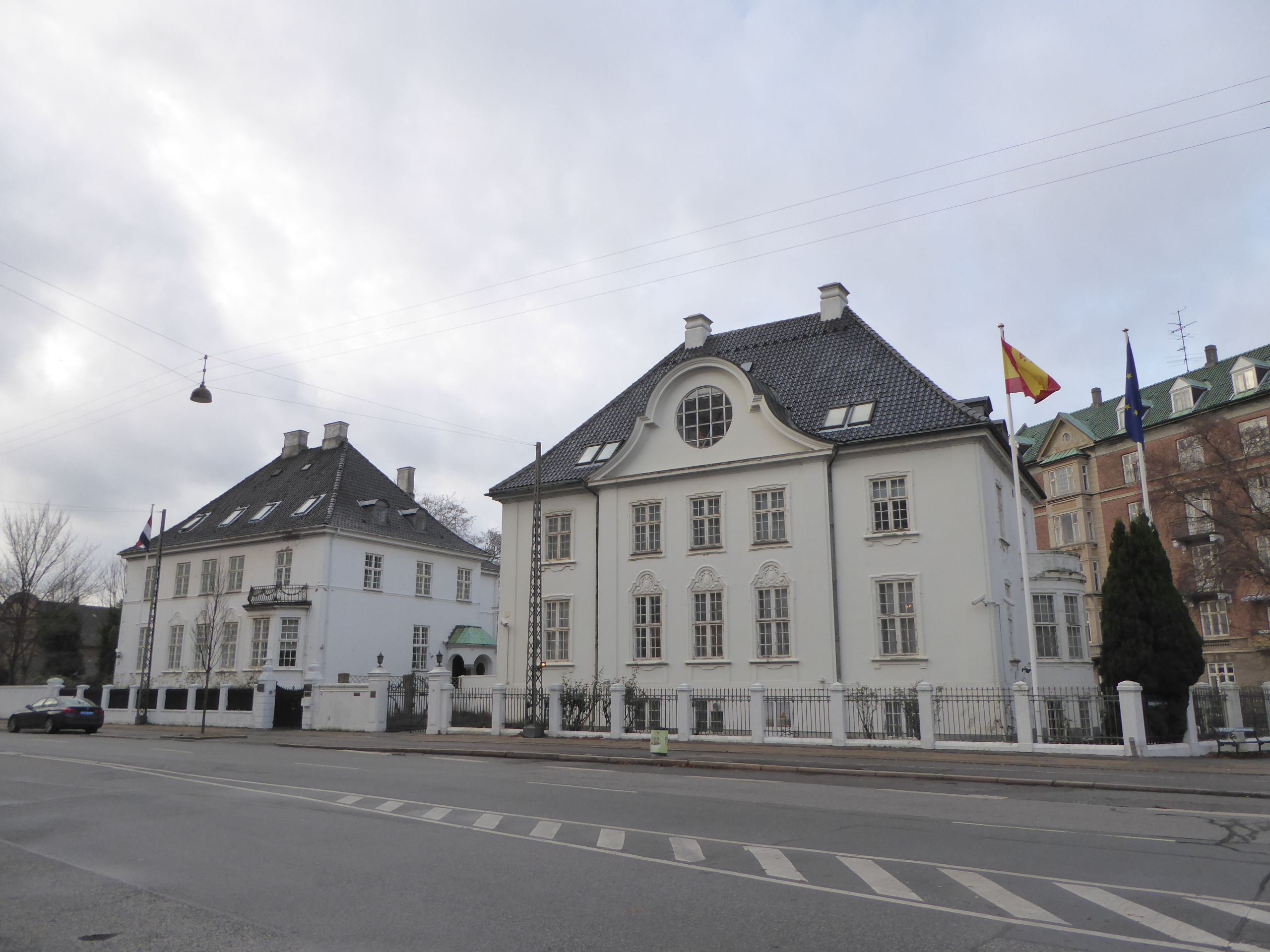
Embassy in Copenhagen

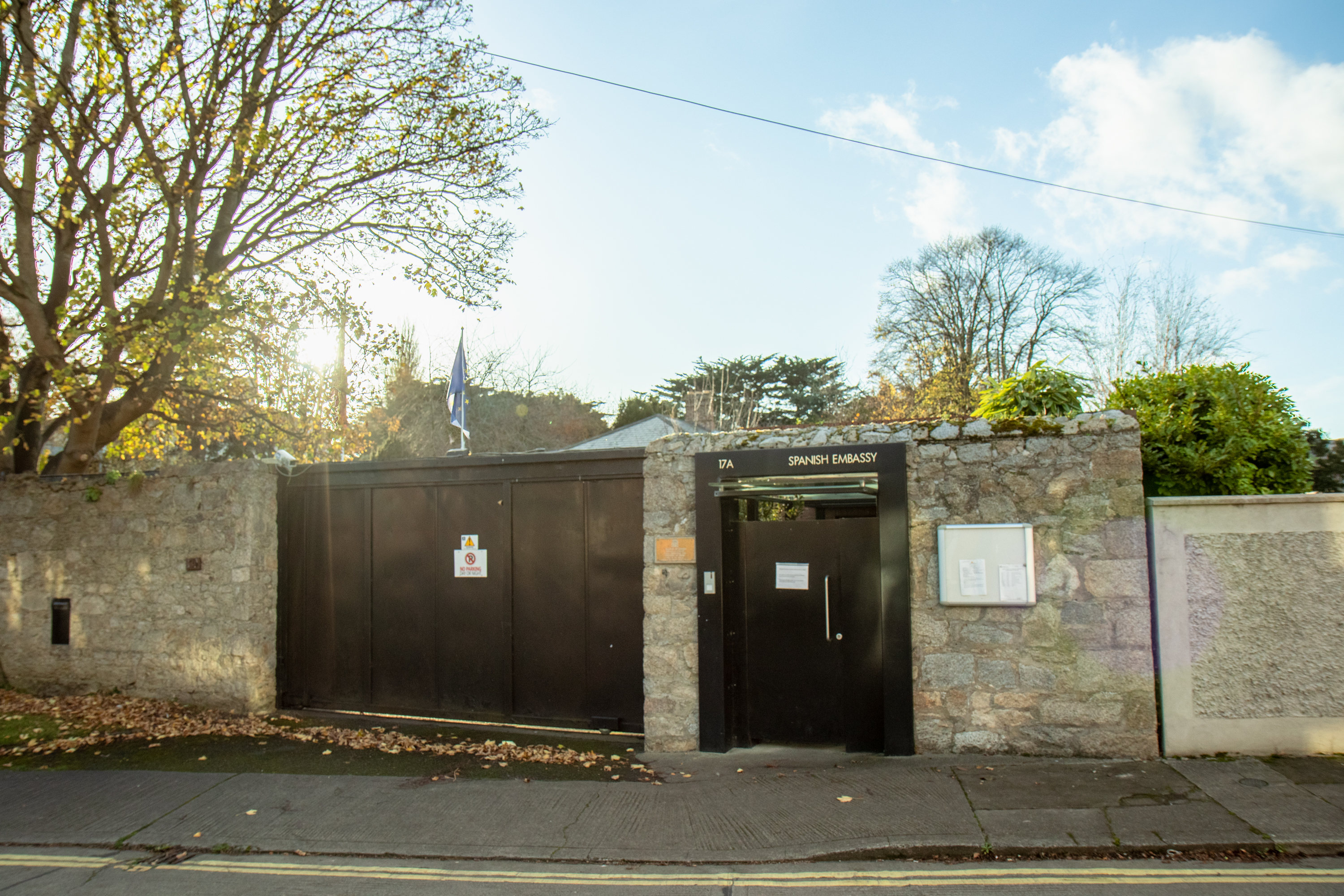
Embassy in Dublin

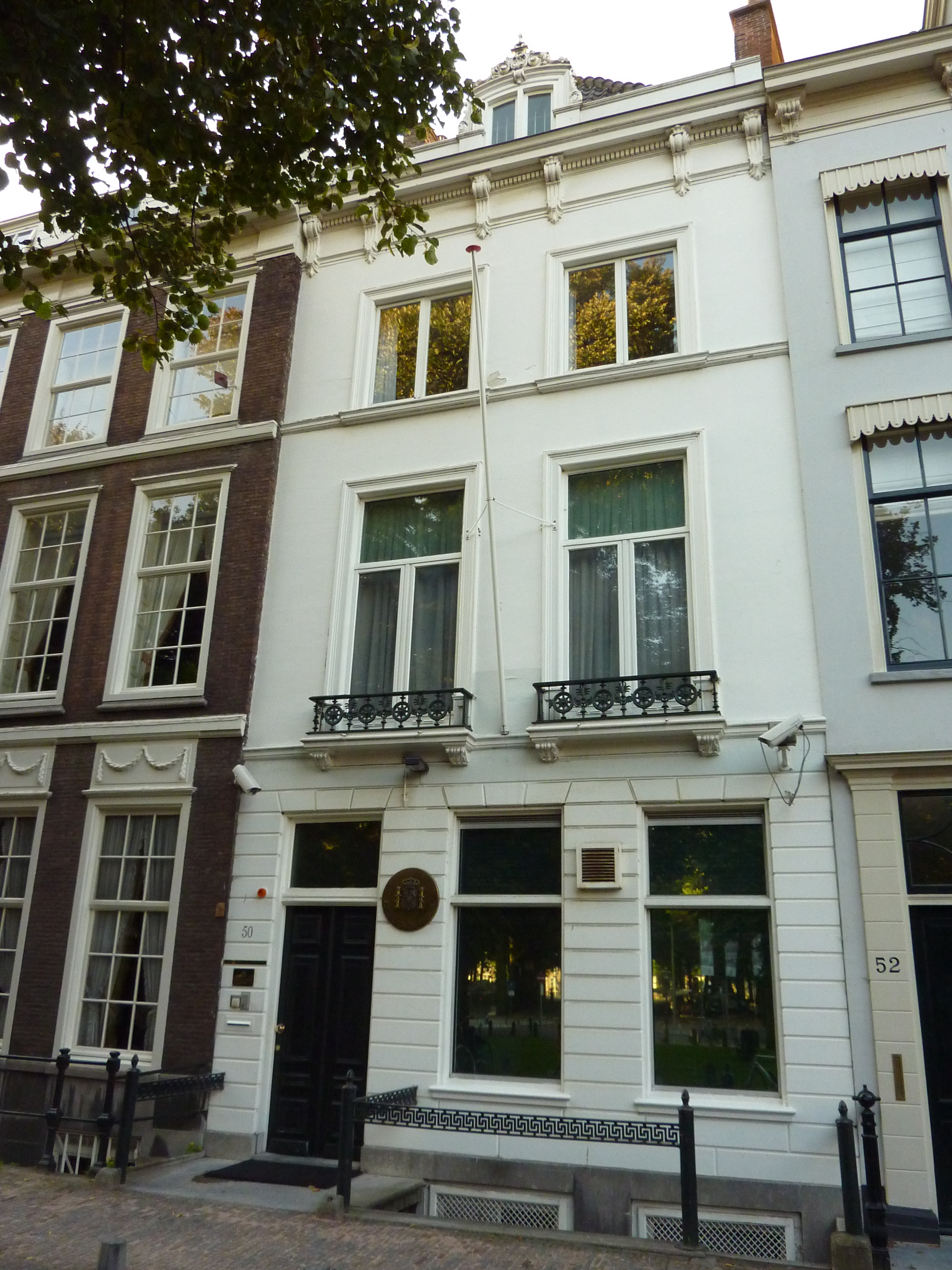
Embassy in The Hague

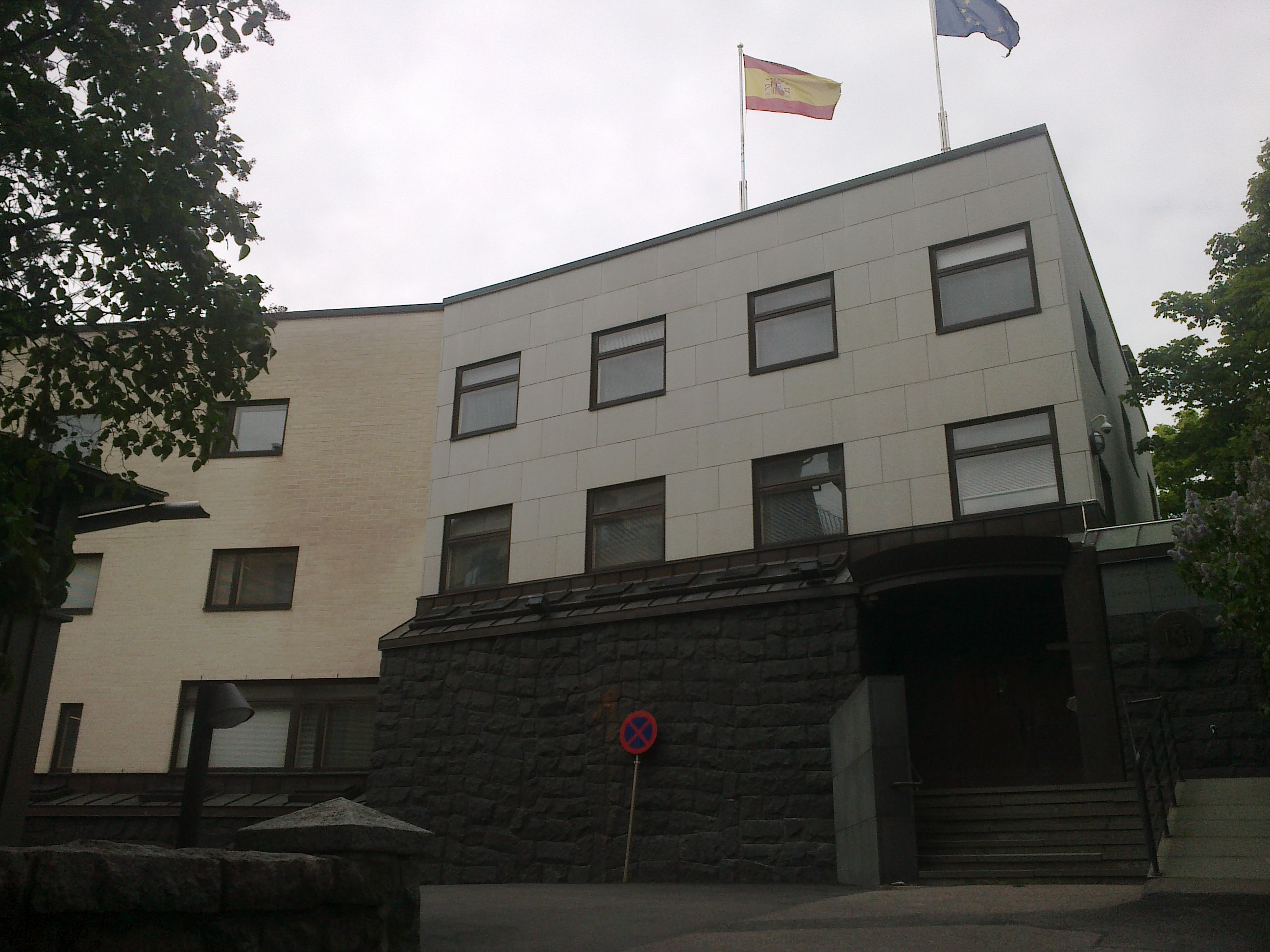
Embassy in Helsinki

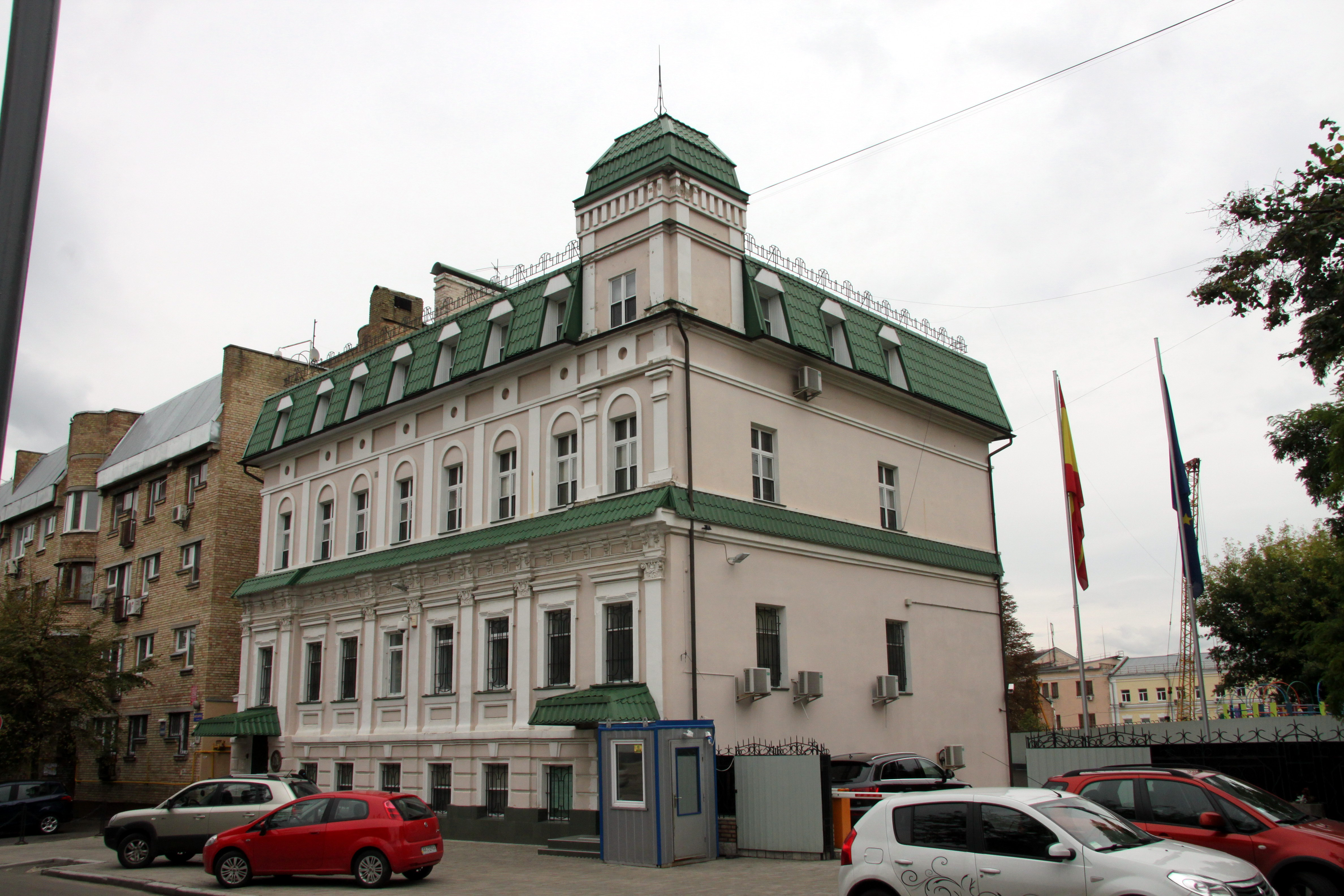
Embassy in Kyiv

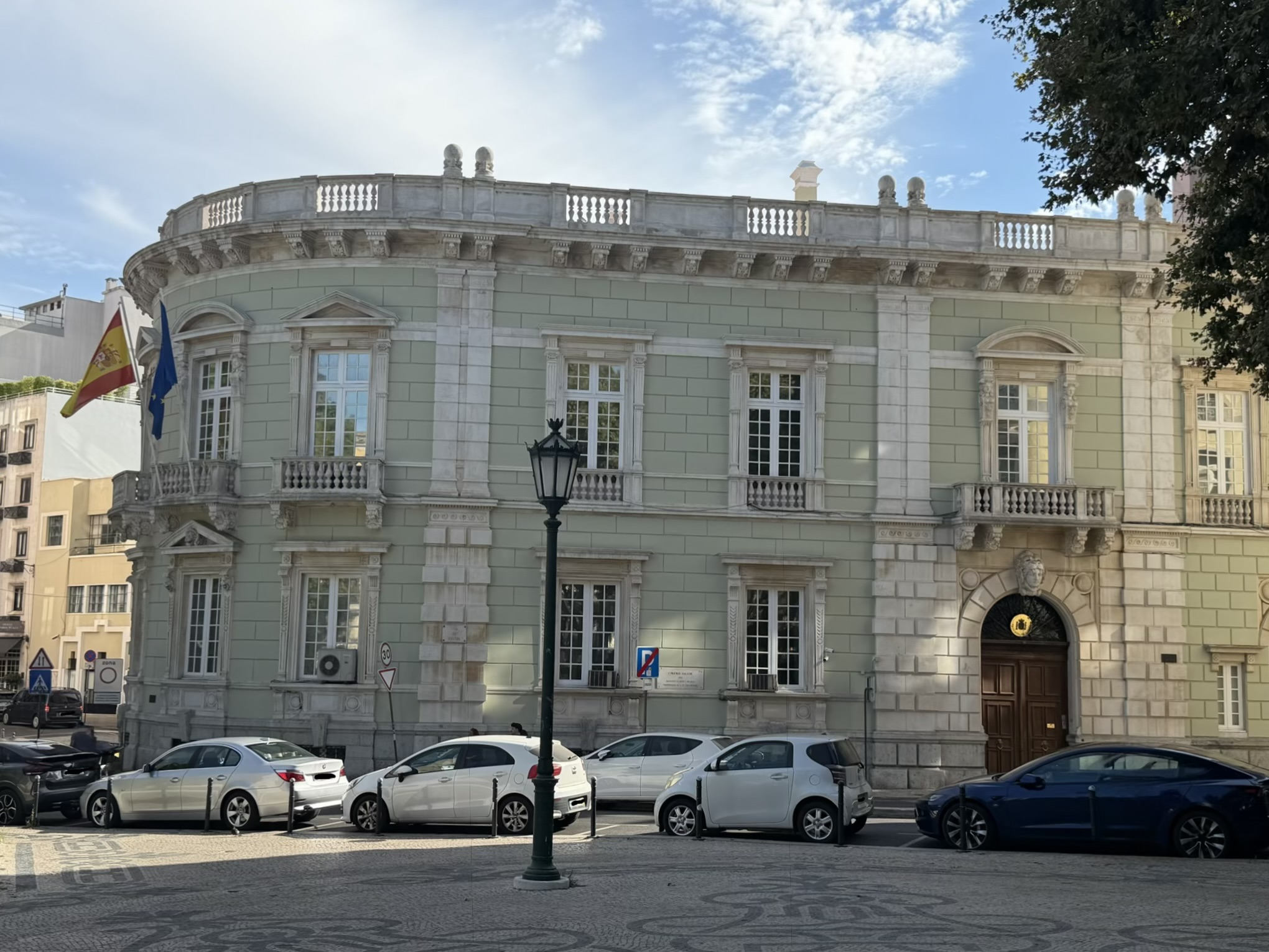
Embassy in Lisbon

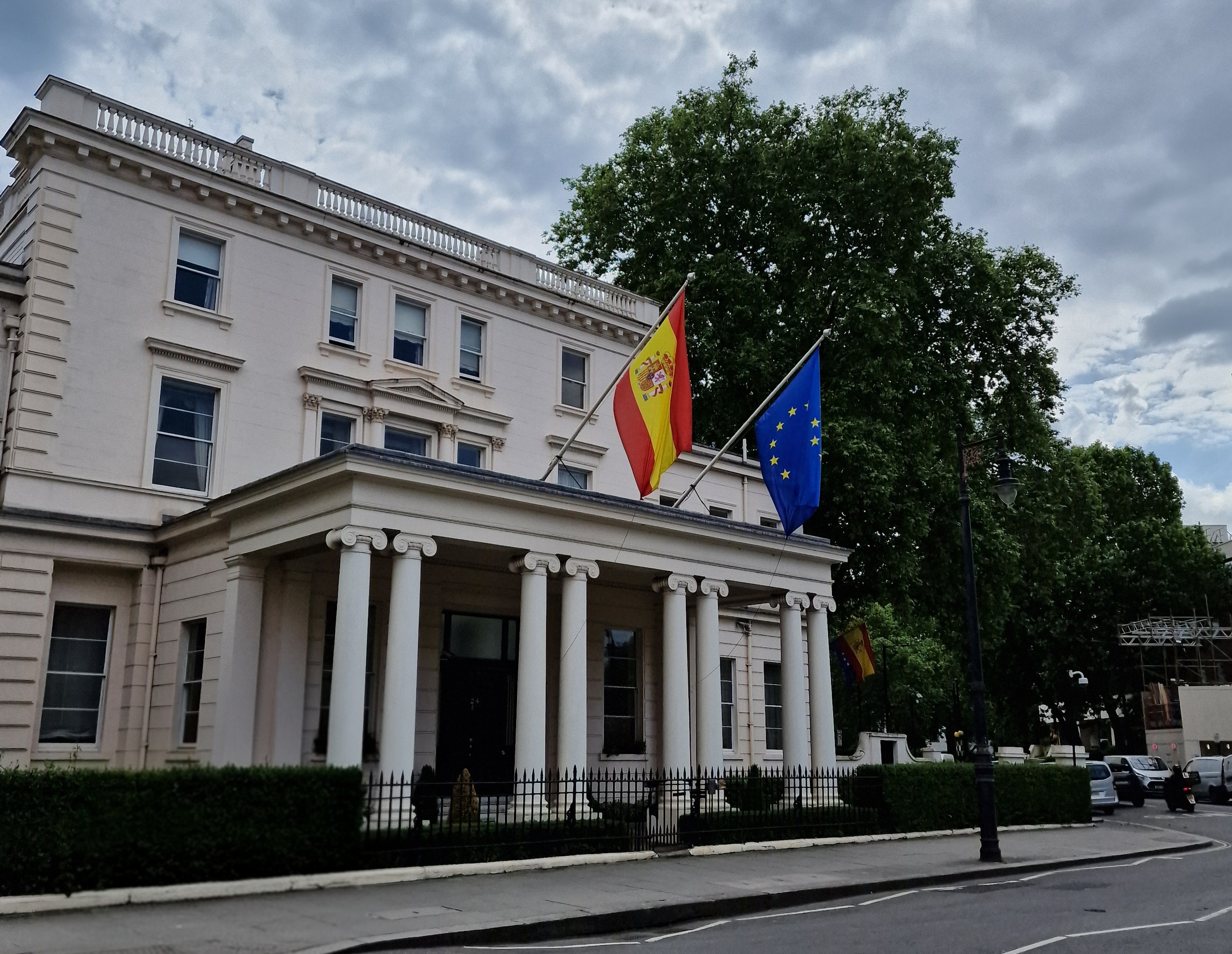
Embassy in London

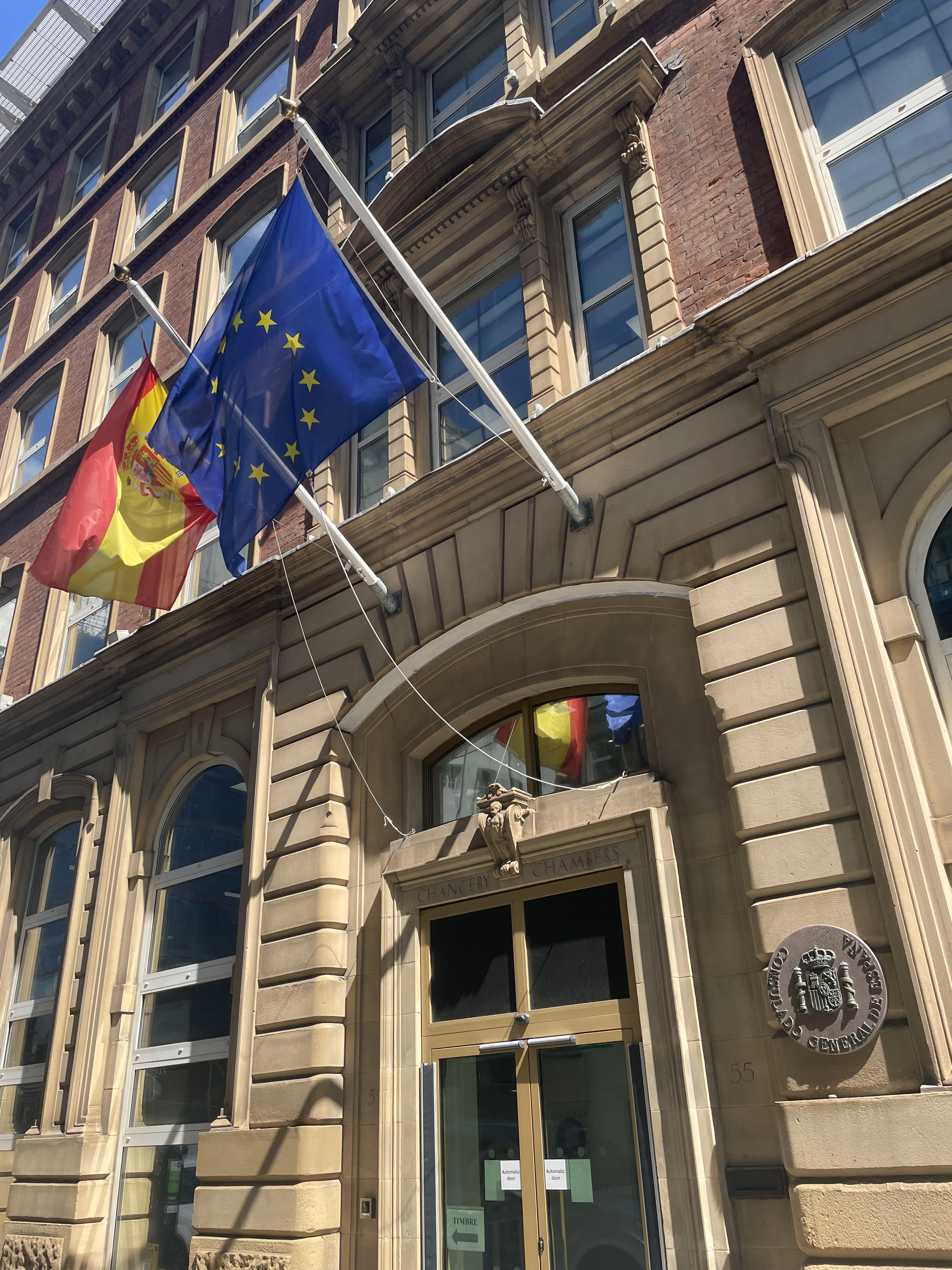
Consulate-General in Manchester

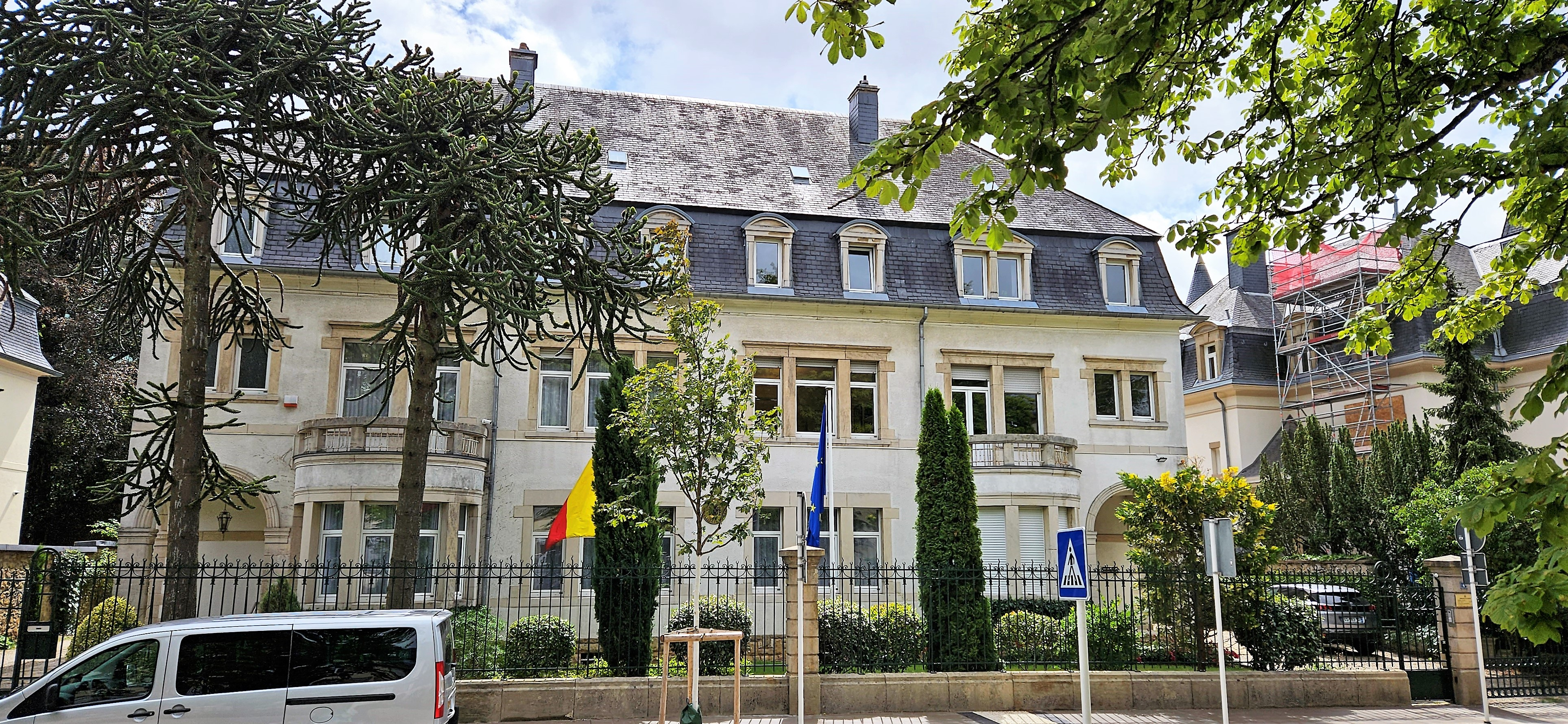
Embassy in Luxembourg

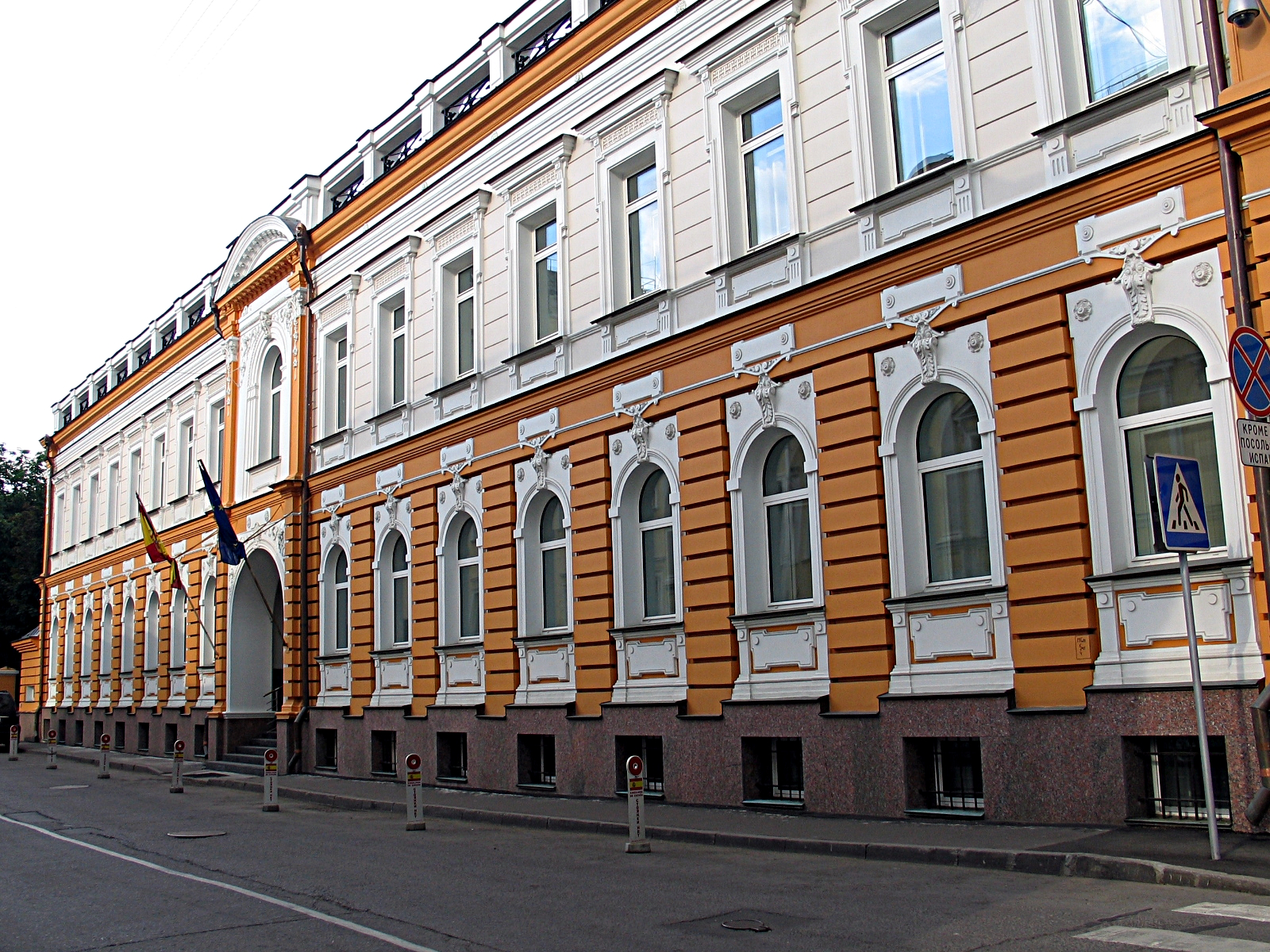
Embassy in Moscow

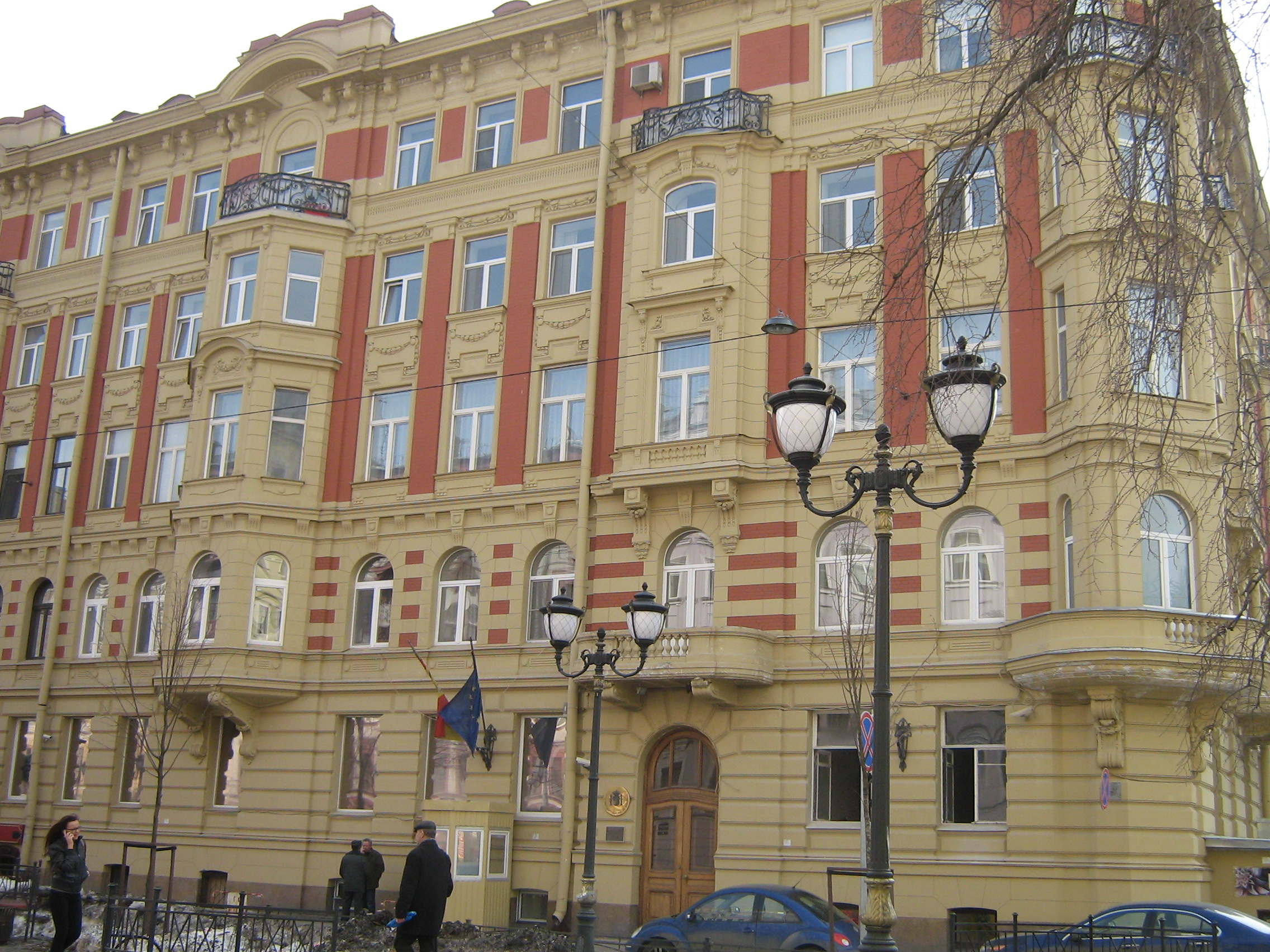
Consulate-General in Saint Petersburg

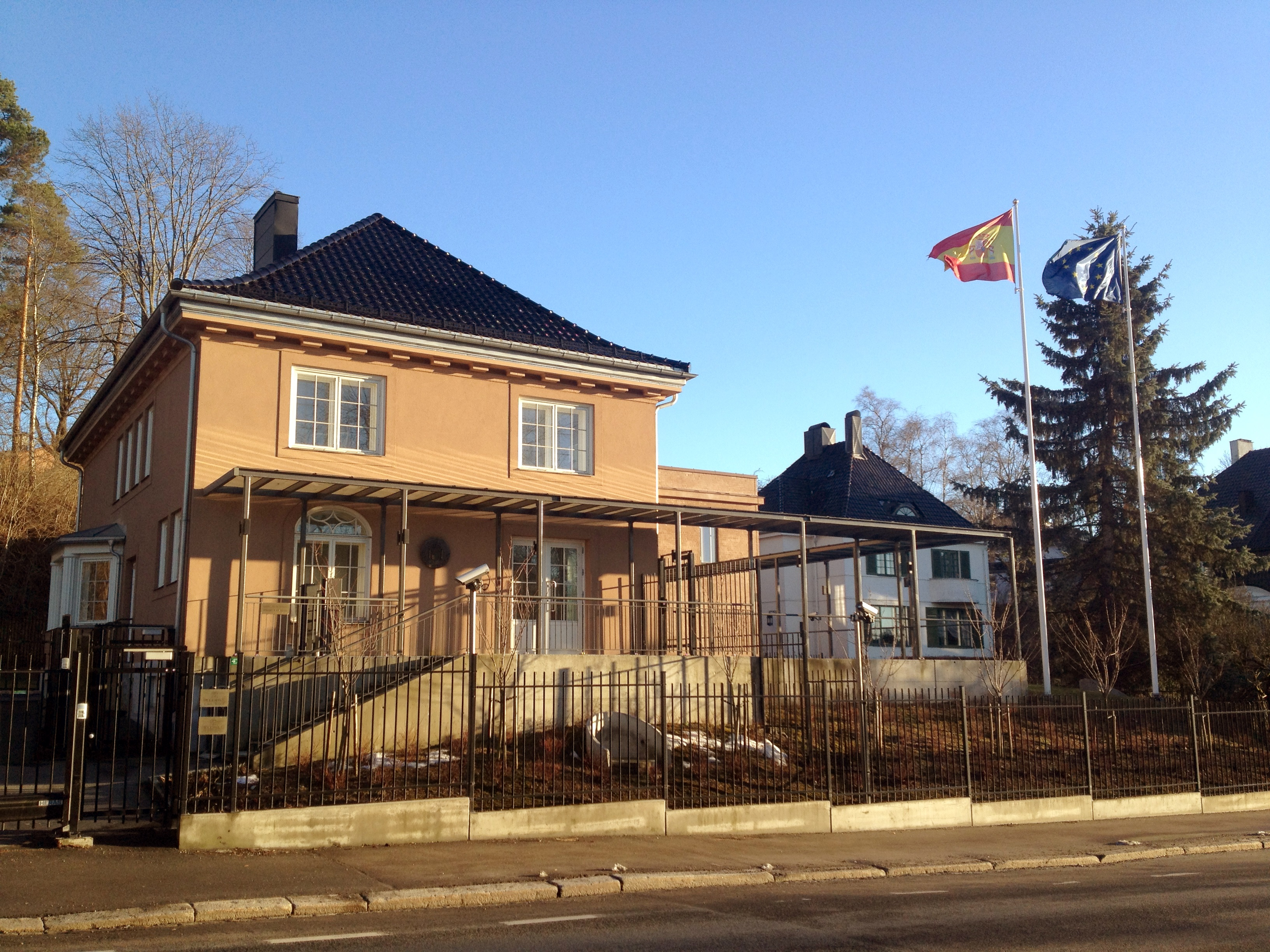
Embassy in Oslo

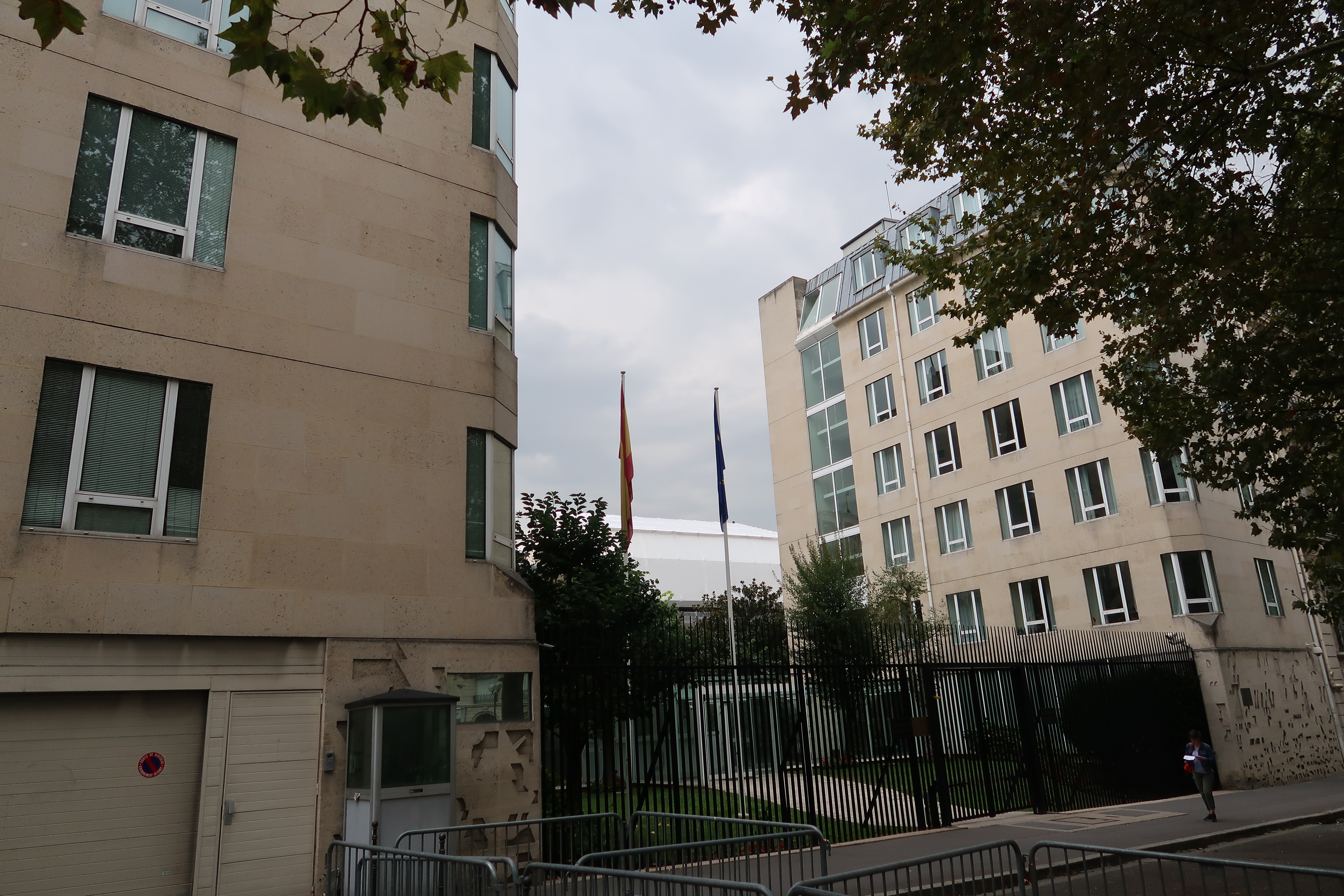
Embassy in Paris

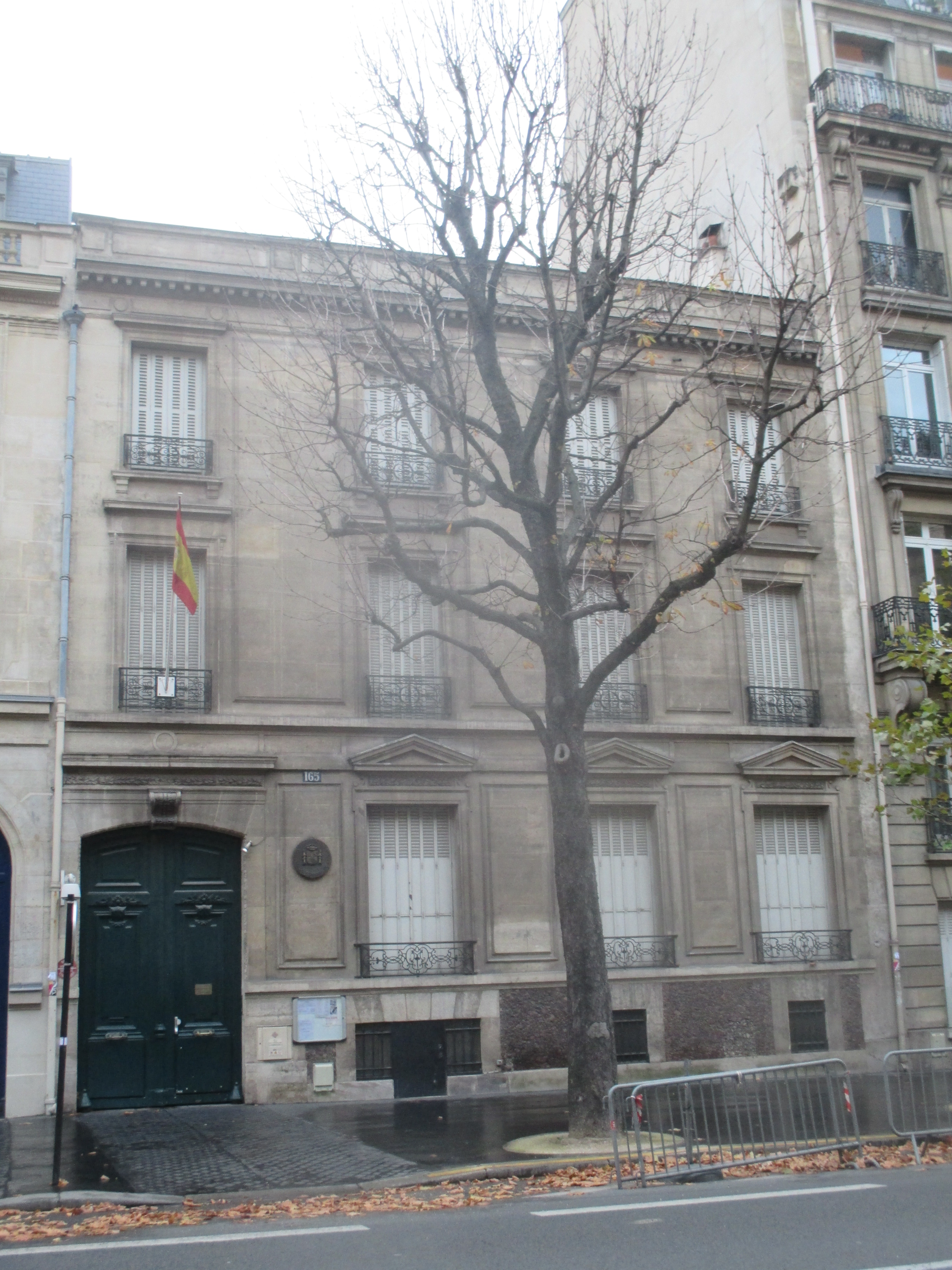
Consulate-General in Paris

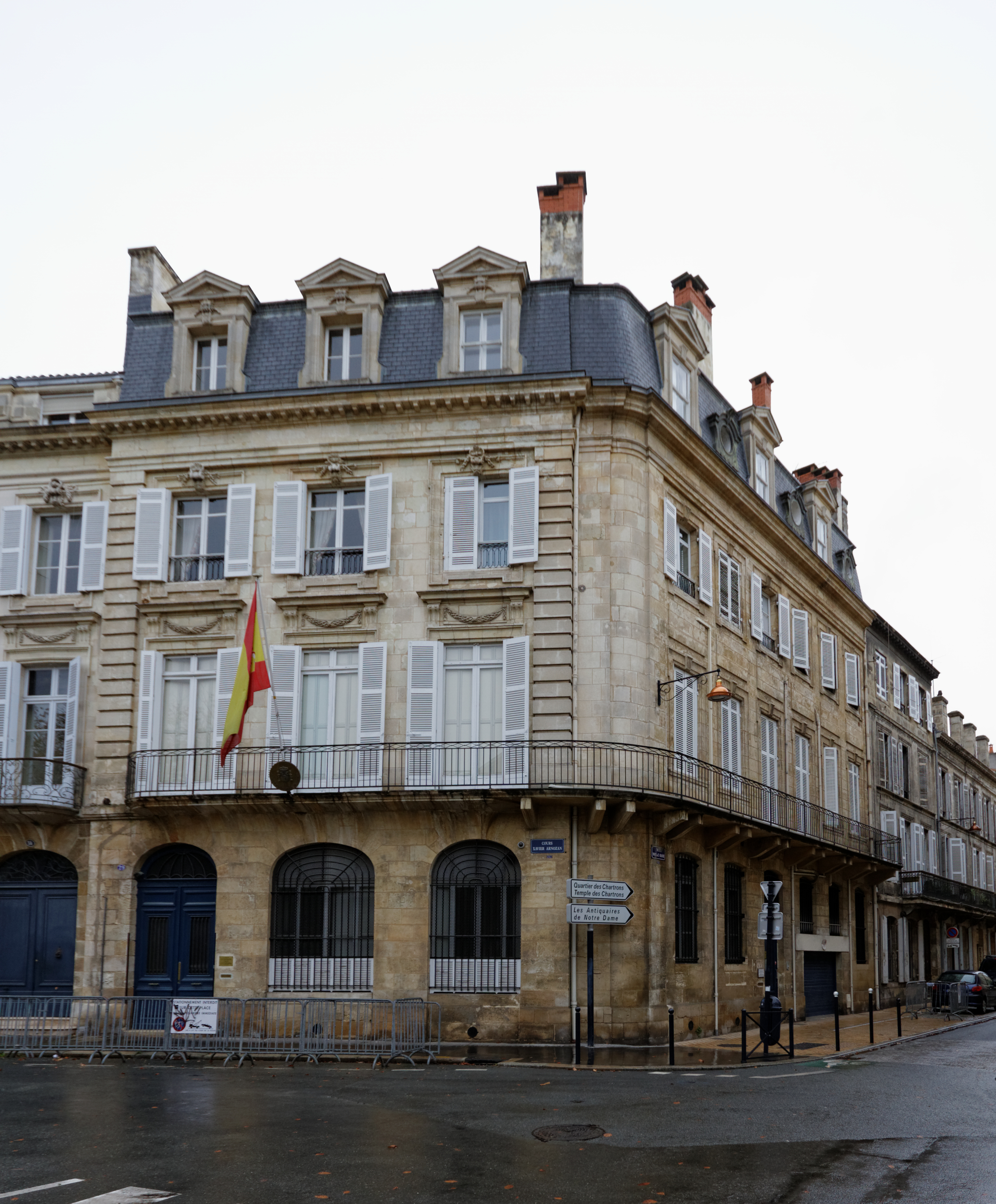
Consulate-General in Bordeaux

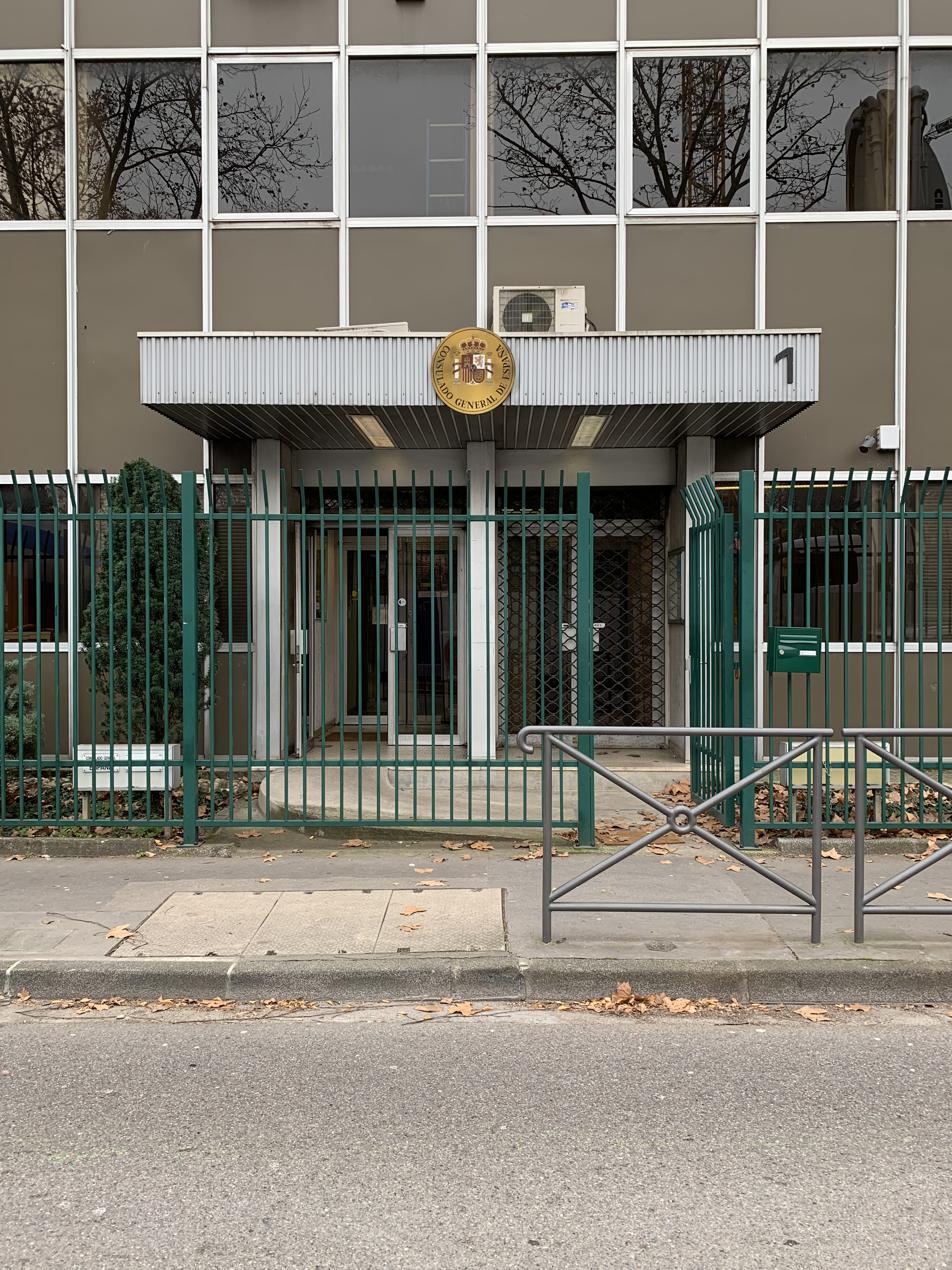
Consulate-General in Lyon

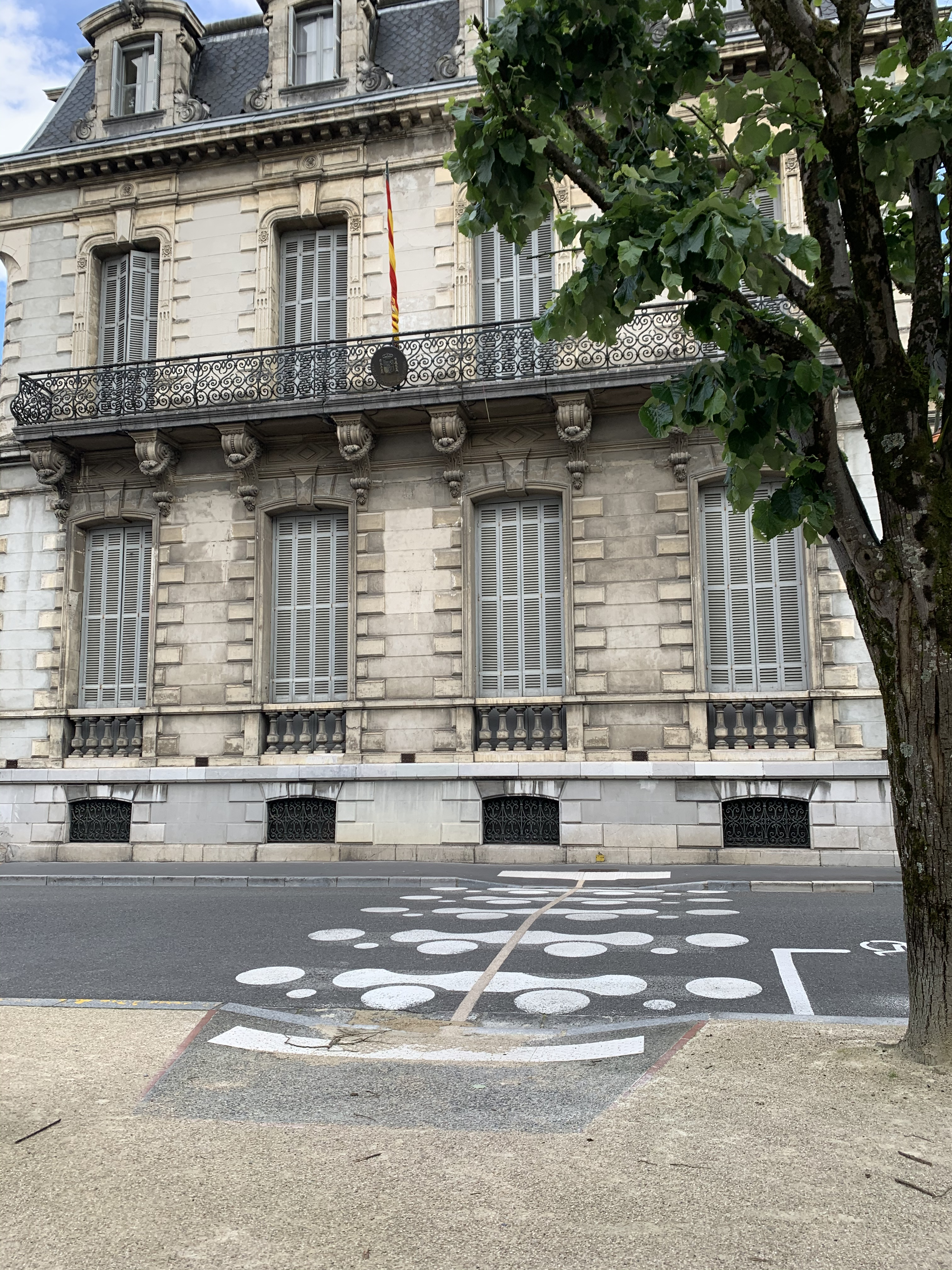
Consulate-General in Pau

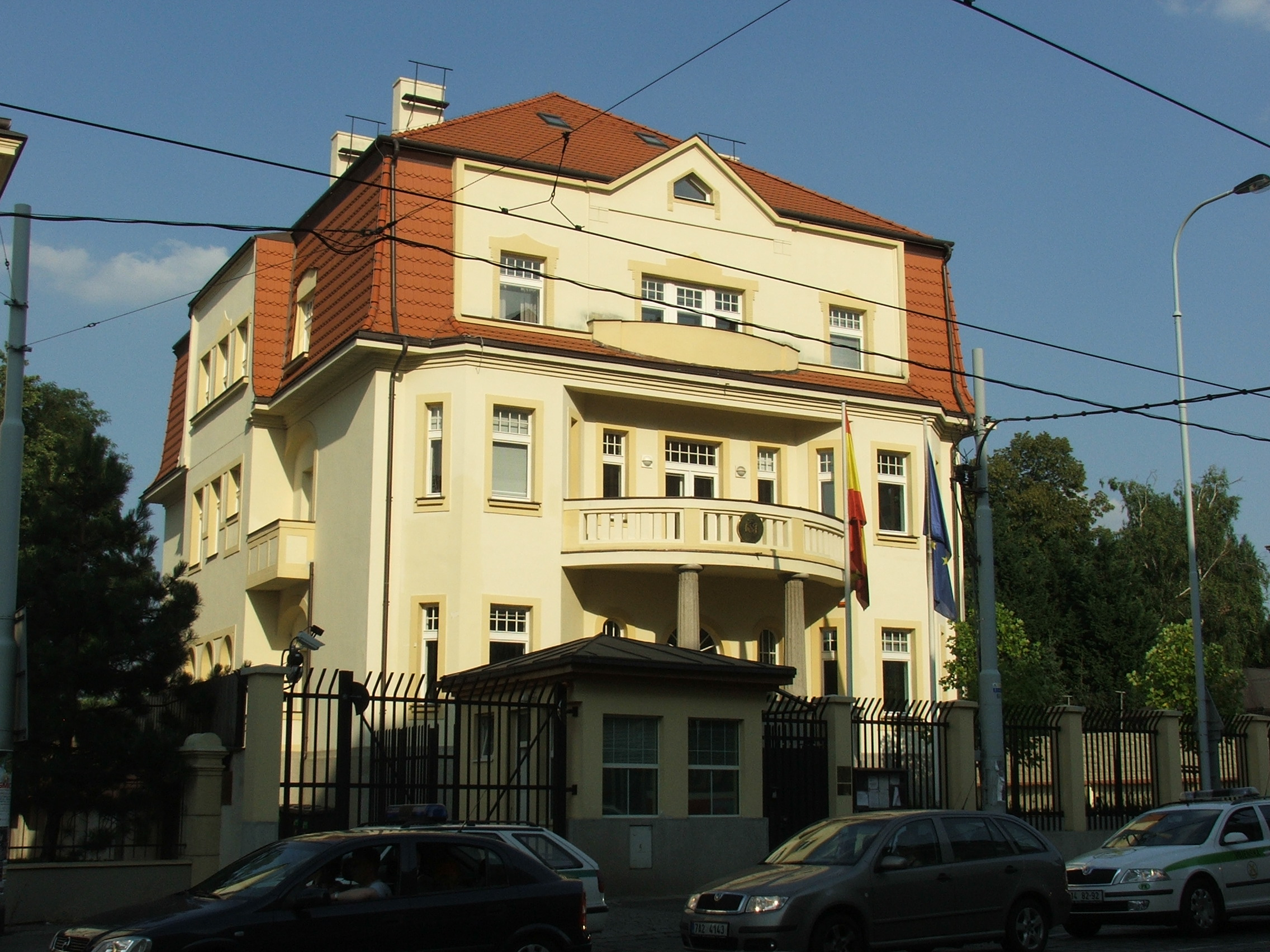
Embassy in Prague

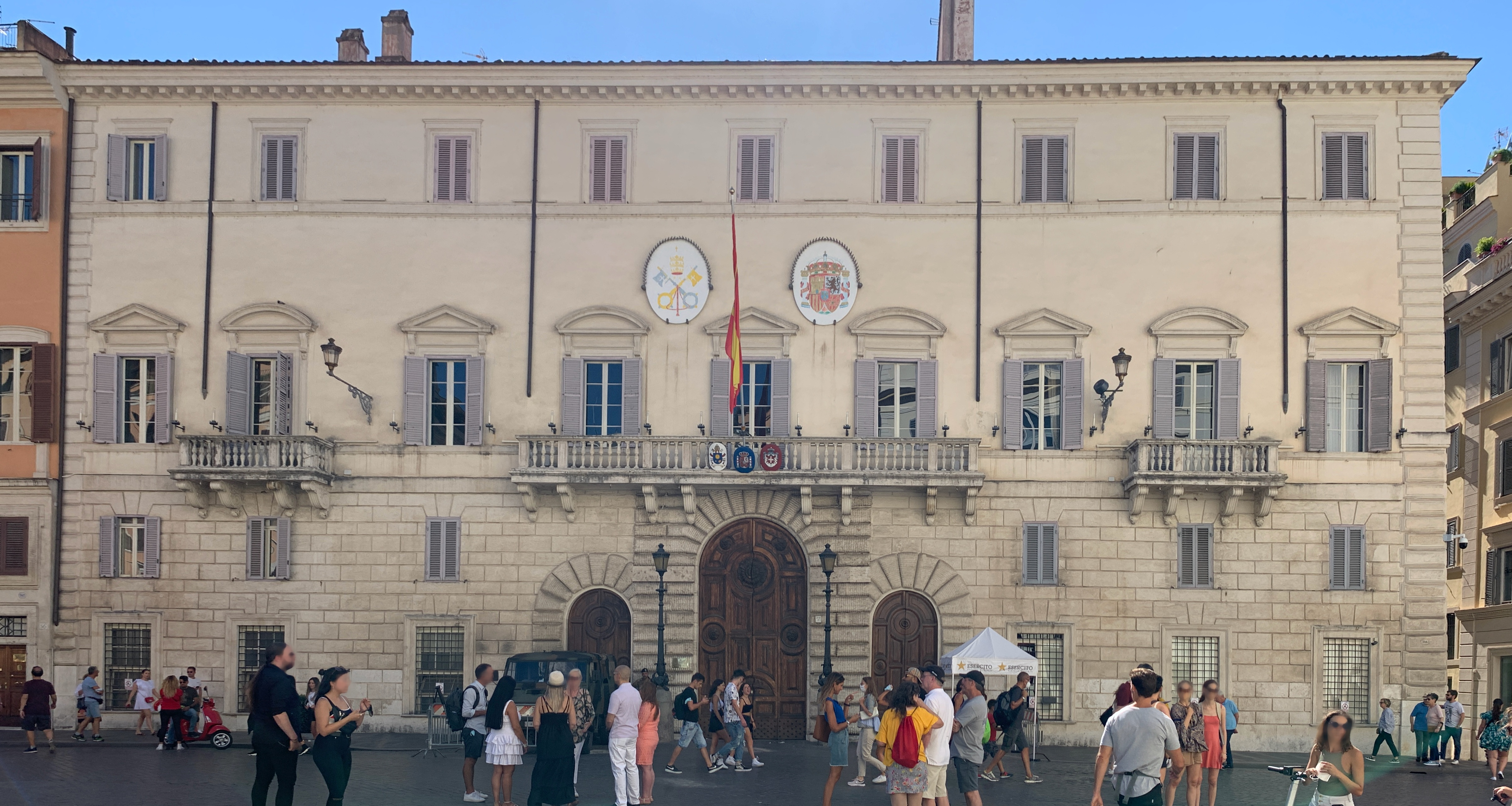
Embassy to the Holy See in Rome

Embassy to Rome

Building hosting the Consulate-General in Milan

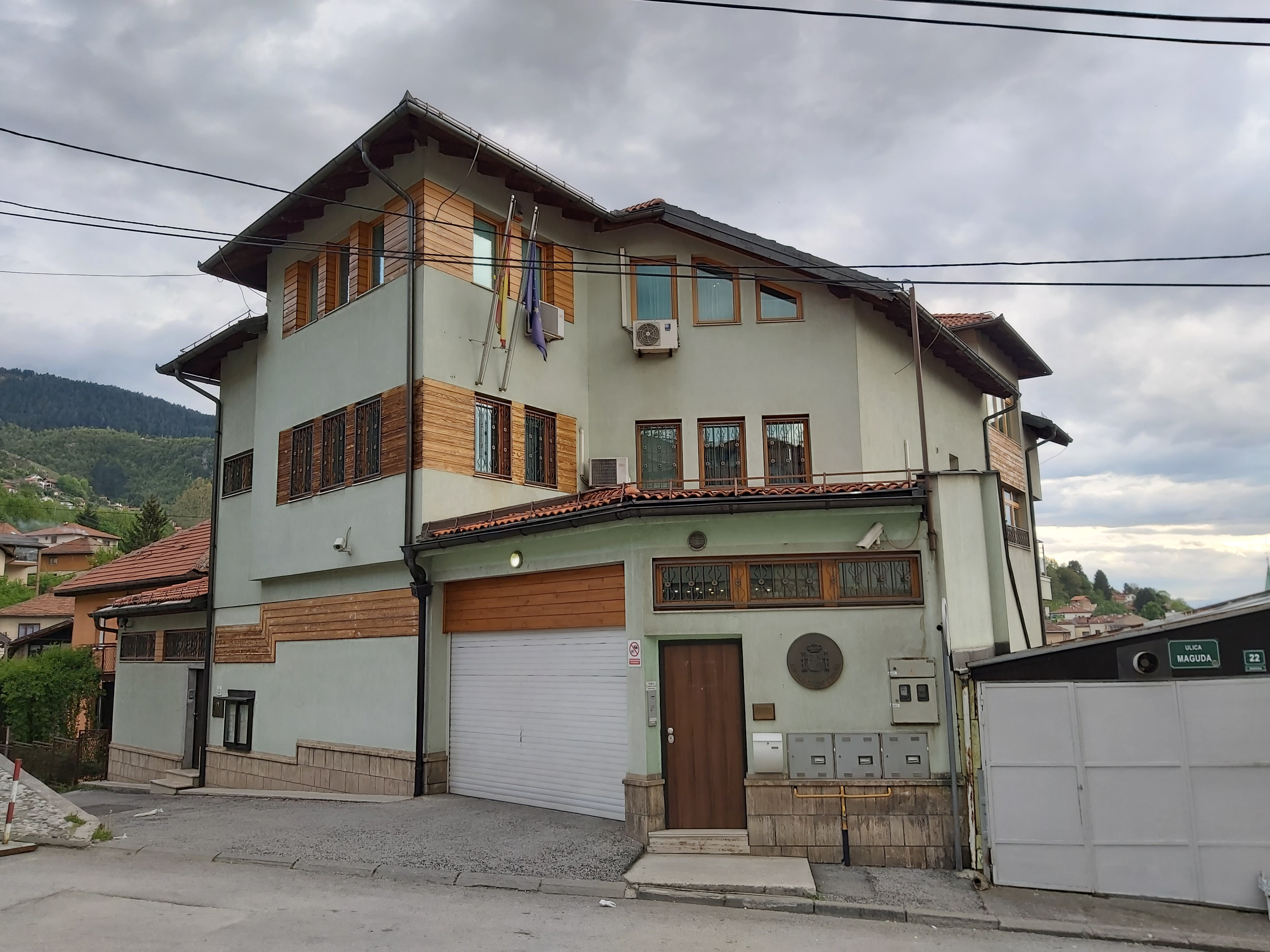
Embassy in Sarajevo

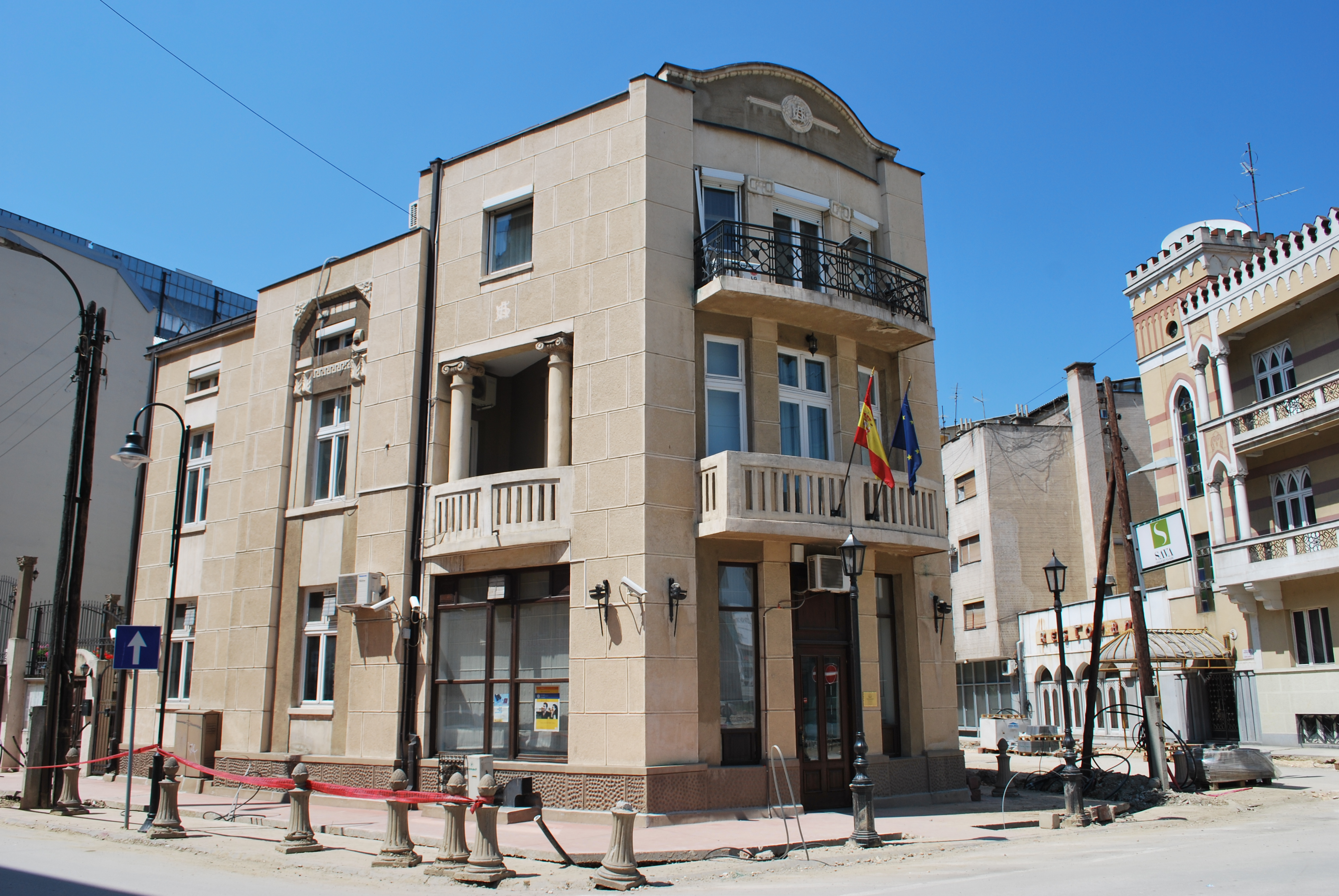
Embassy in Skopje

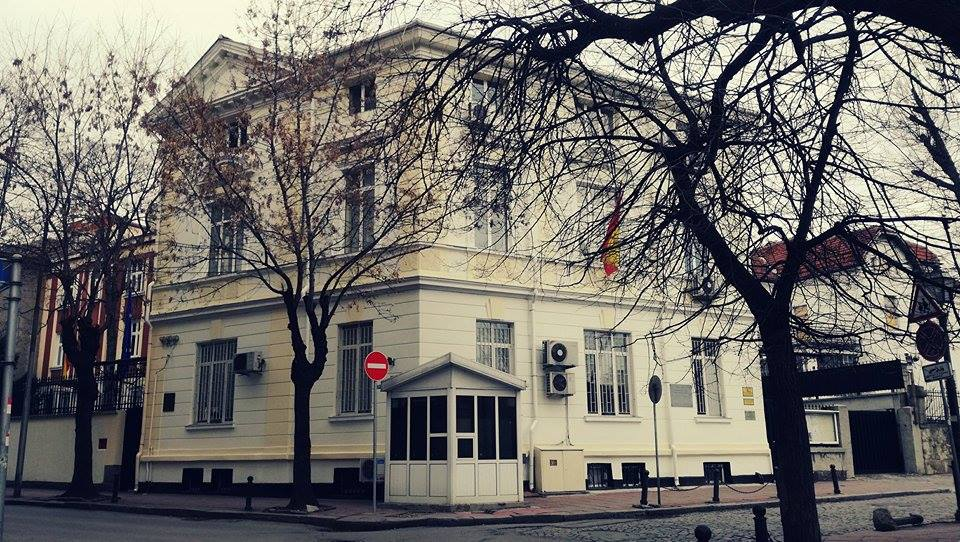
Embassy in Sofia

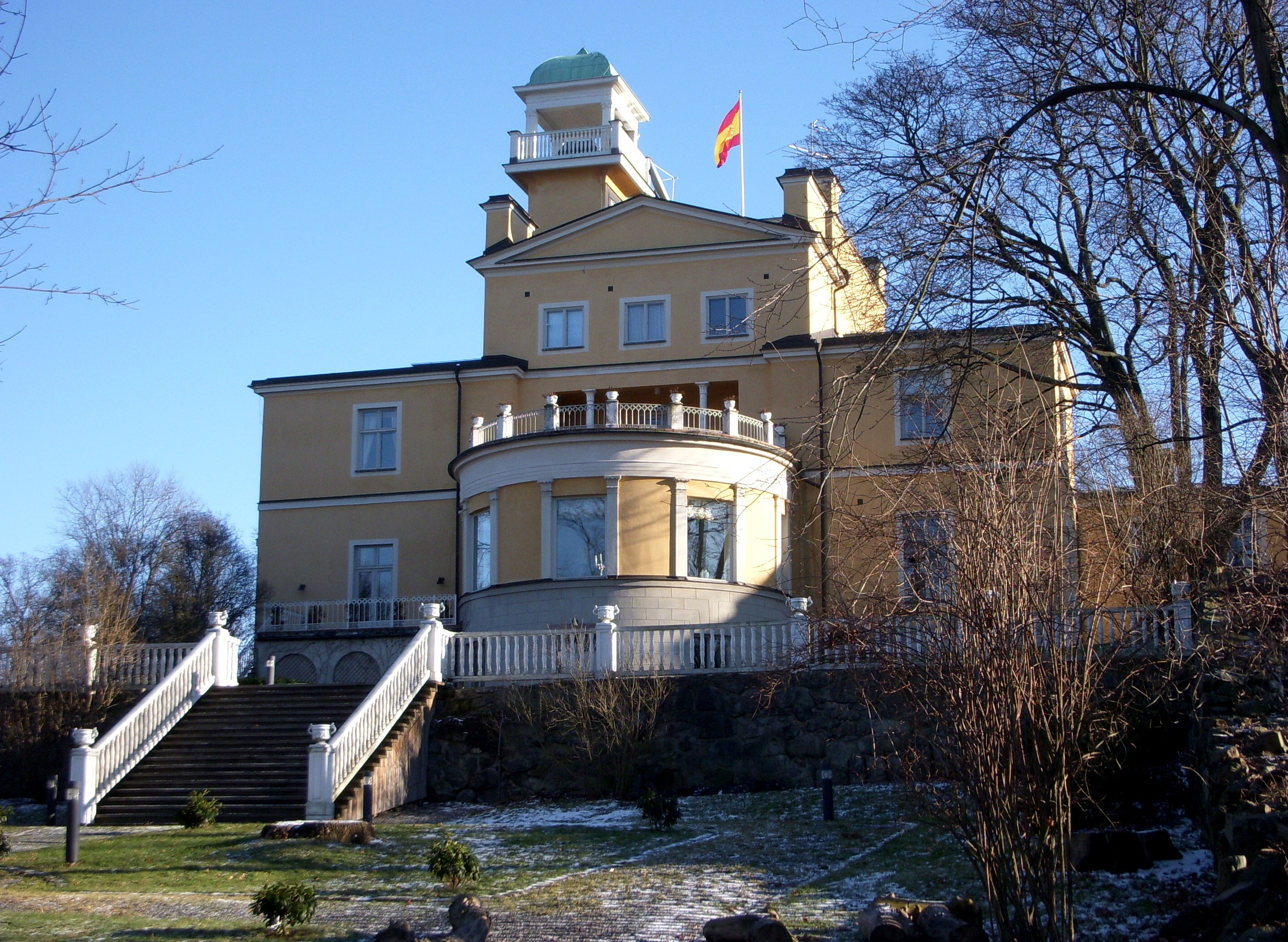
Embassy in Stockholm

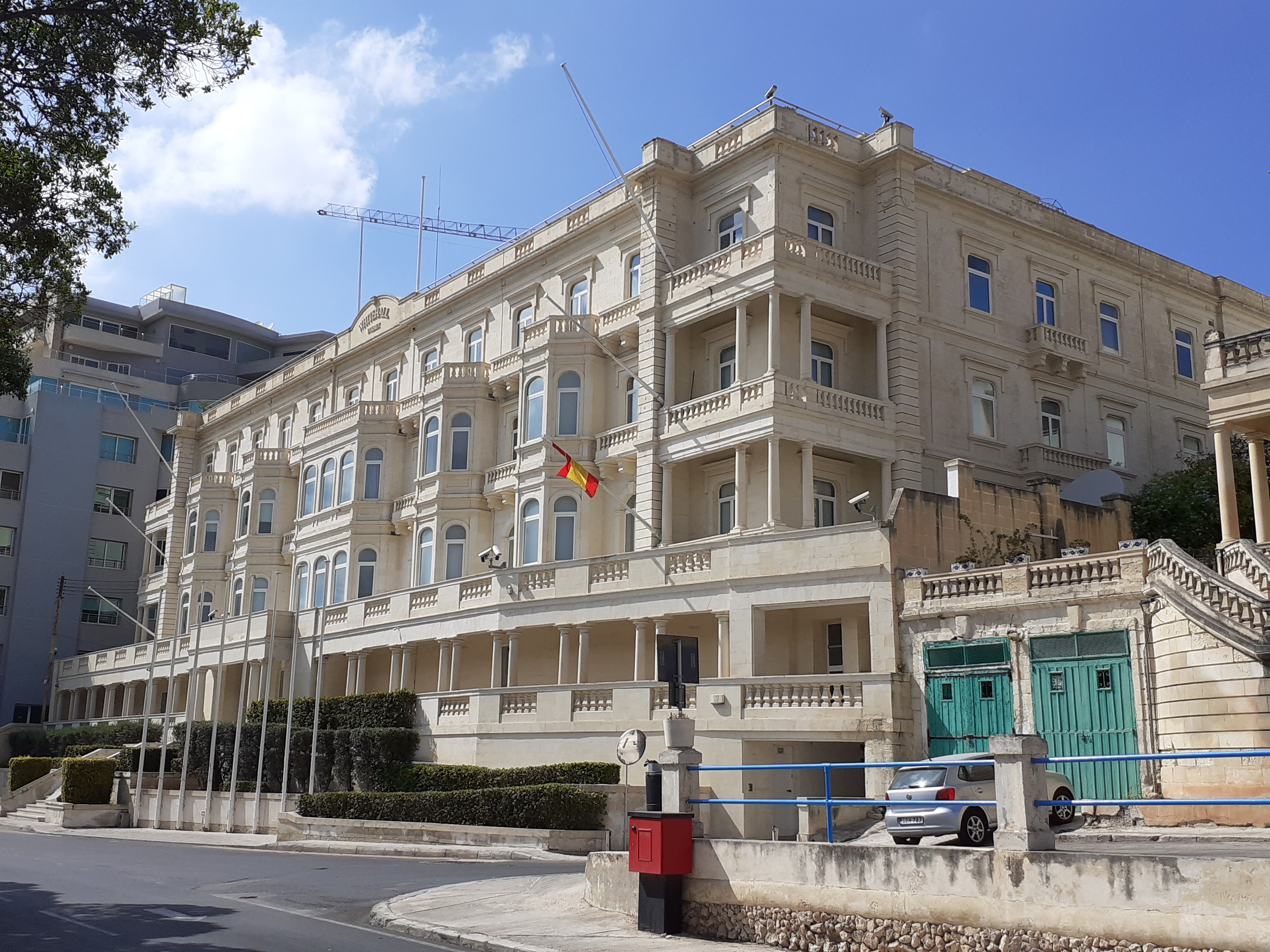
Building hosting the embassy in Valletta

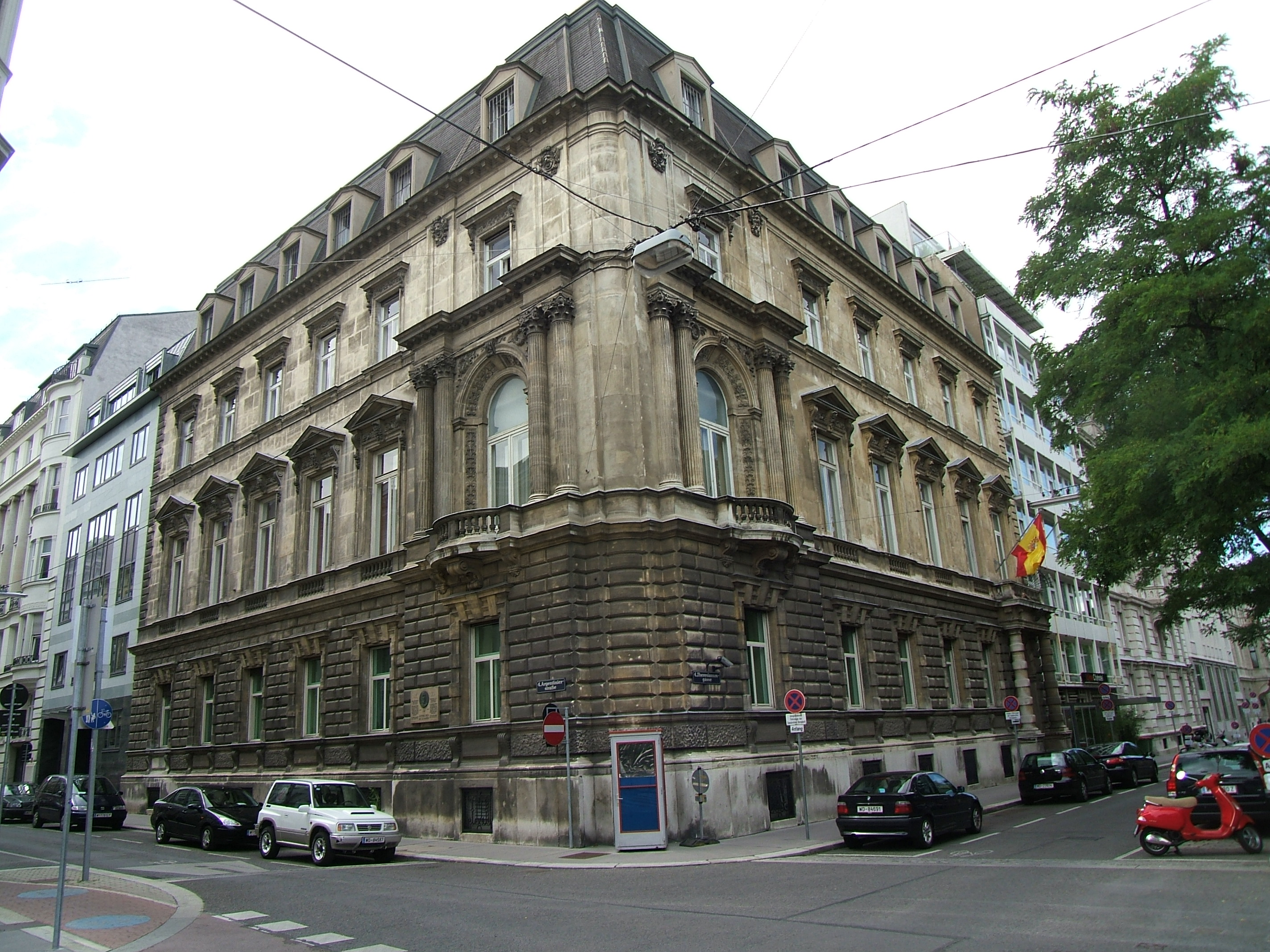
Embassy in Vienna

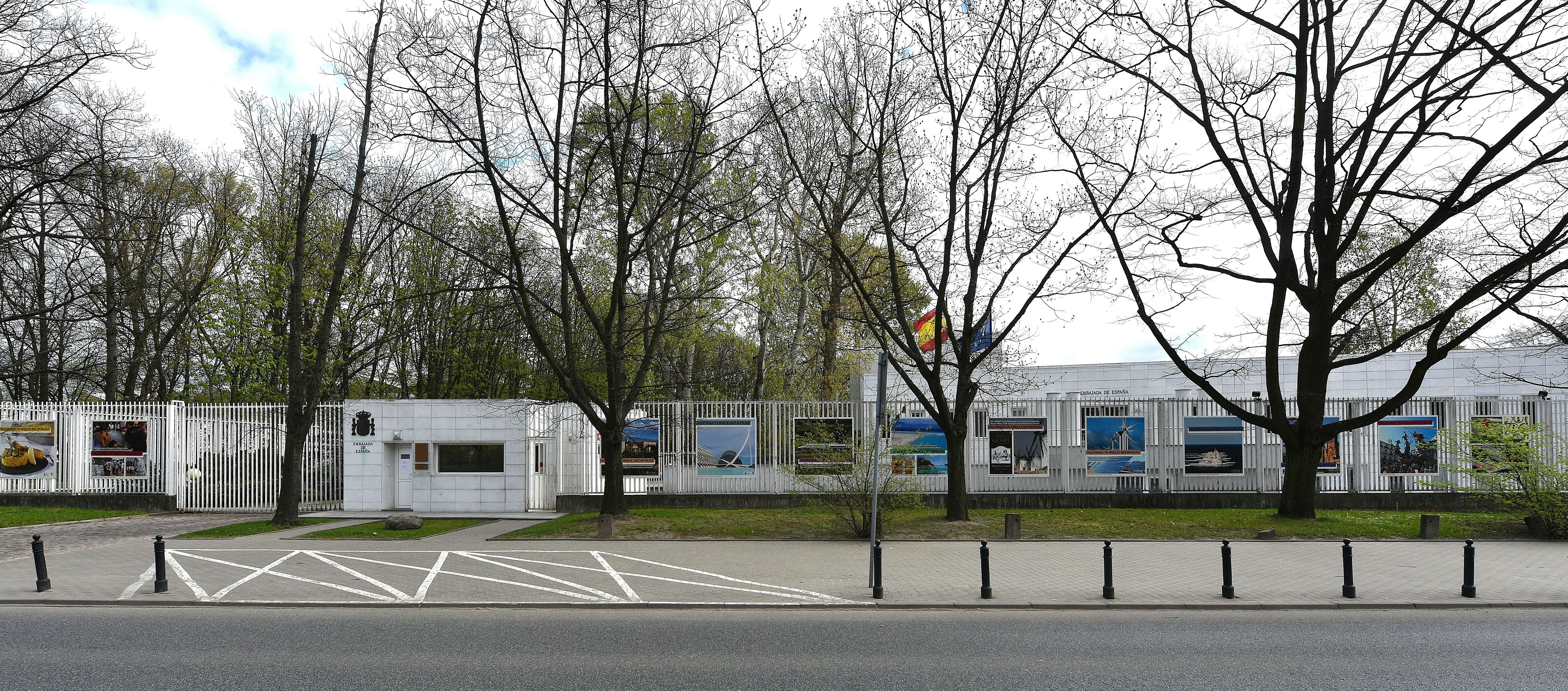
Embassy in Warsaw

=== Oceania ===
Host country	Host city	Mission	Concurrent accreditation	Ref.
Australia	Canberra	Embassy	Countries: Nauru; Papua New Guinea; Solomon Islands; Tuvalu; Vanuatu	
Australia	Melbourne	Consulate-General	Countries: Nauru; Papua New Guinea; Solomon Islands; Tuvalu; Vanuatu	
Australia	Sydney	Consulate-General	Countries: Nauru; Papua New Guinea; Solomon Islands; Tuvalu; Vanuatu	
Fiji	Suva	Embassy office (Note: Subordinate to the embassy in Wellington, New Zealand.)		
New Zealand	Wellington	Embassy	Countries: Cook Islands; Fiji; Kiribati; Samoa; Tonga	

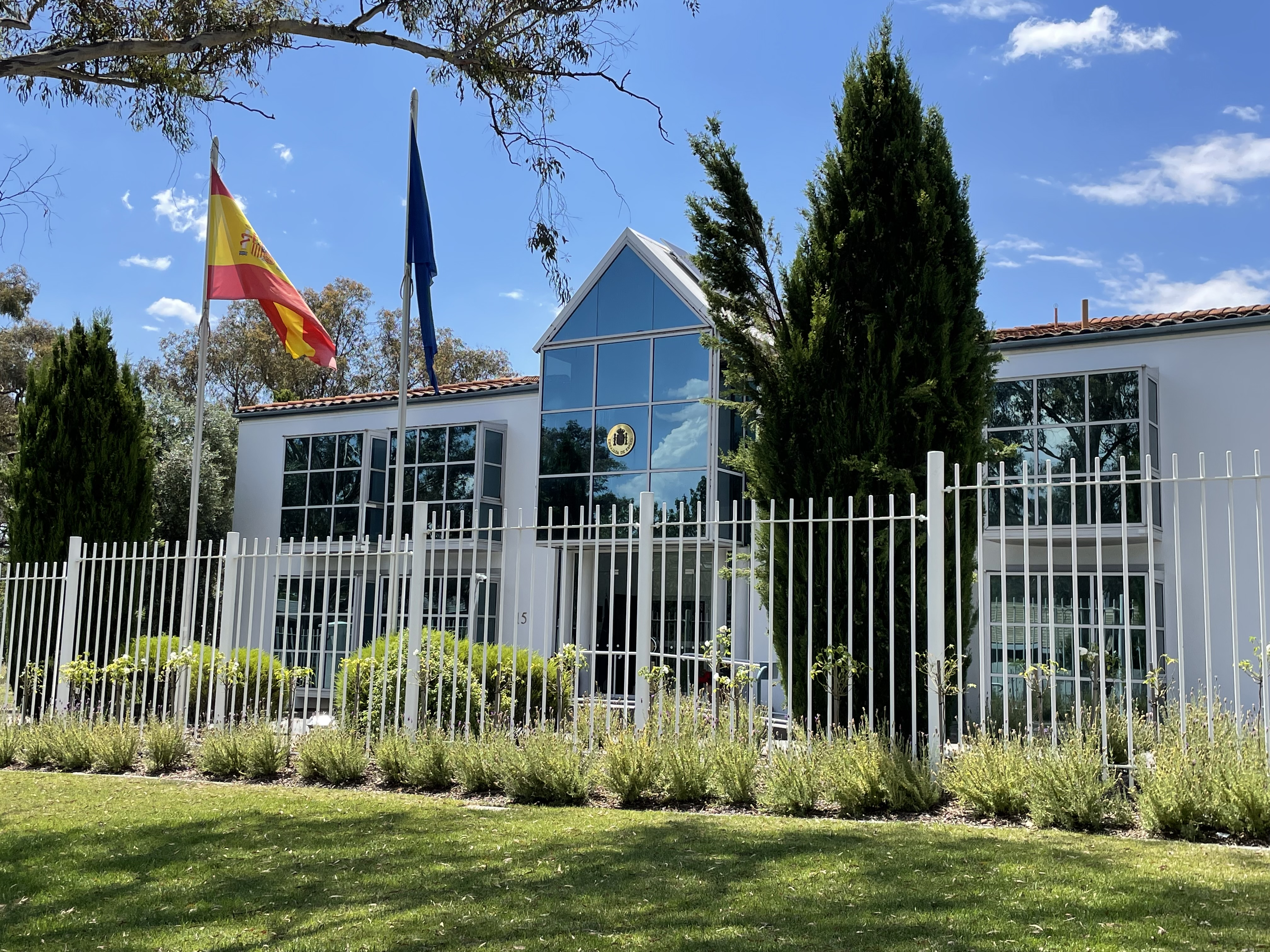
Embassy in Canberra

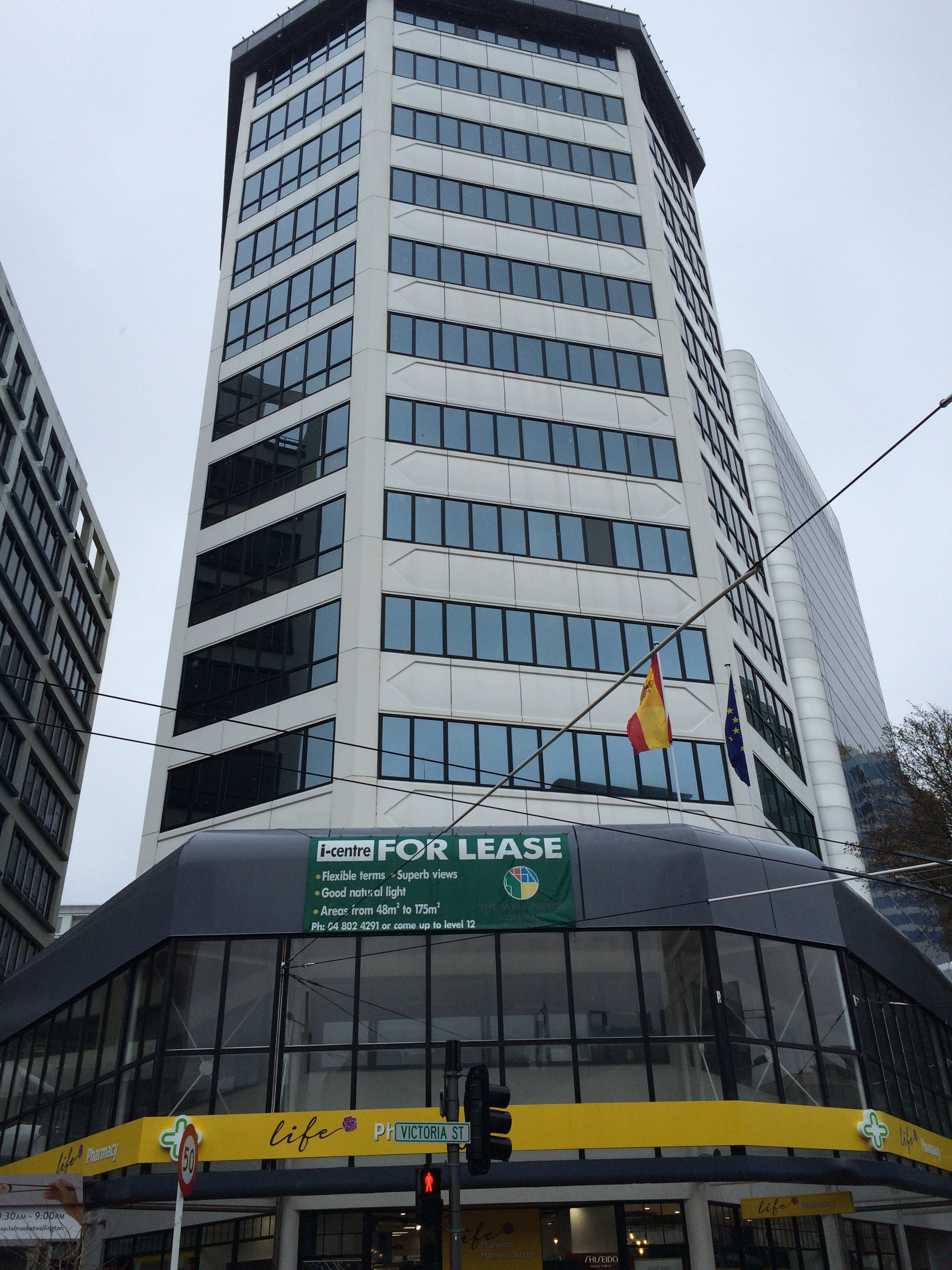
Building hosting the embassy in Wellington

=== Multilateral organizations ===
Organization	Host city	Host country	Mission	Concurrent accreditation	Ref.
Council of Europe	Strasbourg	France	Permanent Representation		
European Union	Brussels	Belgium	Permanent Representation		
NATO	Brussels	Belgium	Permanent Representation		
Organization of American States	Washington, D.C.	United States	Permanent Representation		
OECD	Paris	France	Permanent Representation		
United Nations	New York City	United States	Permanent Mission		
United Nations	Geneva	Switzerland	Permanent Mission	International organizations: United Nations Conference on Trade and Development; World Health Organization; World Intellectual Property Organization; World Meteorological Organization; World Trade Organization	
United Nations	Vienna	Austria	Permanent Mission	International organizations: OSCE; International Atomic Energy Agency; CTBTO Preparatory Commission; United Nations Commission on International Trade Law; United Nations Industrial Development Organization; United Nations Office on Drugs and Crime	
UNESCO	Paris	France	Permanent Delegation		

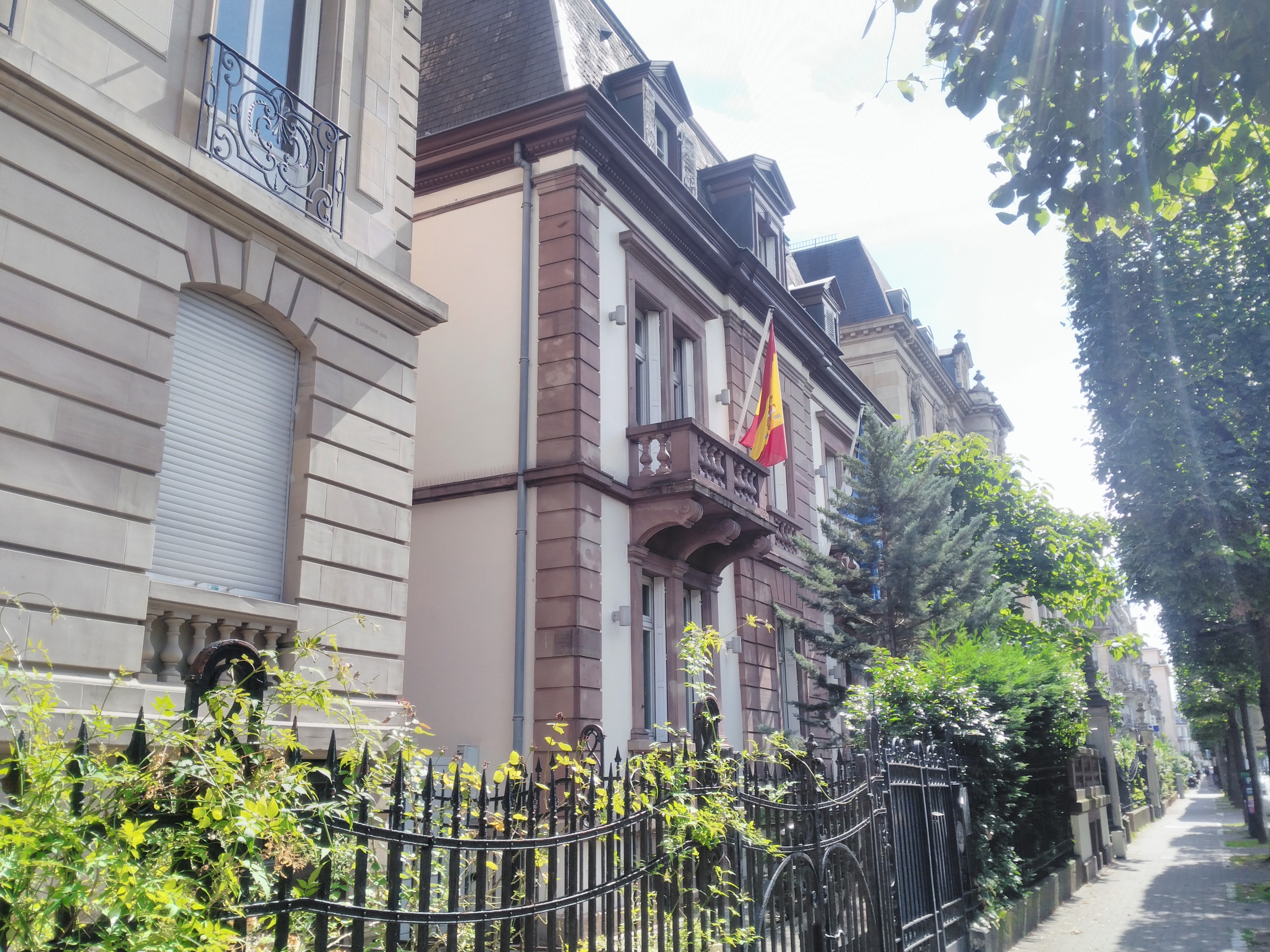
Permanent Mission to the Council of Europe in Strasbourg

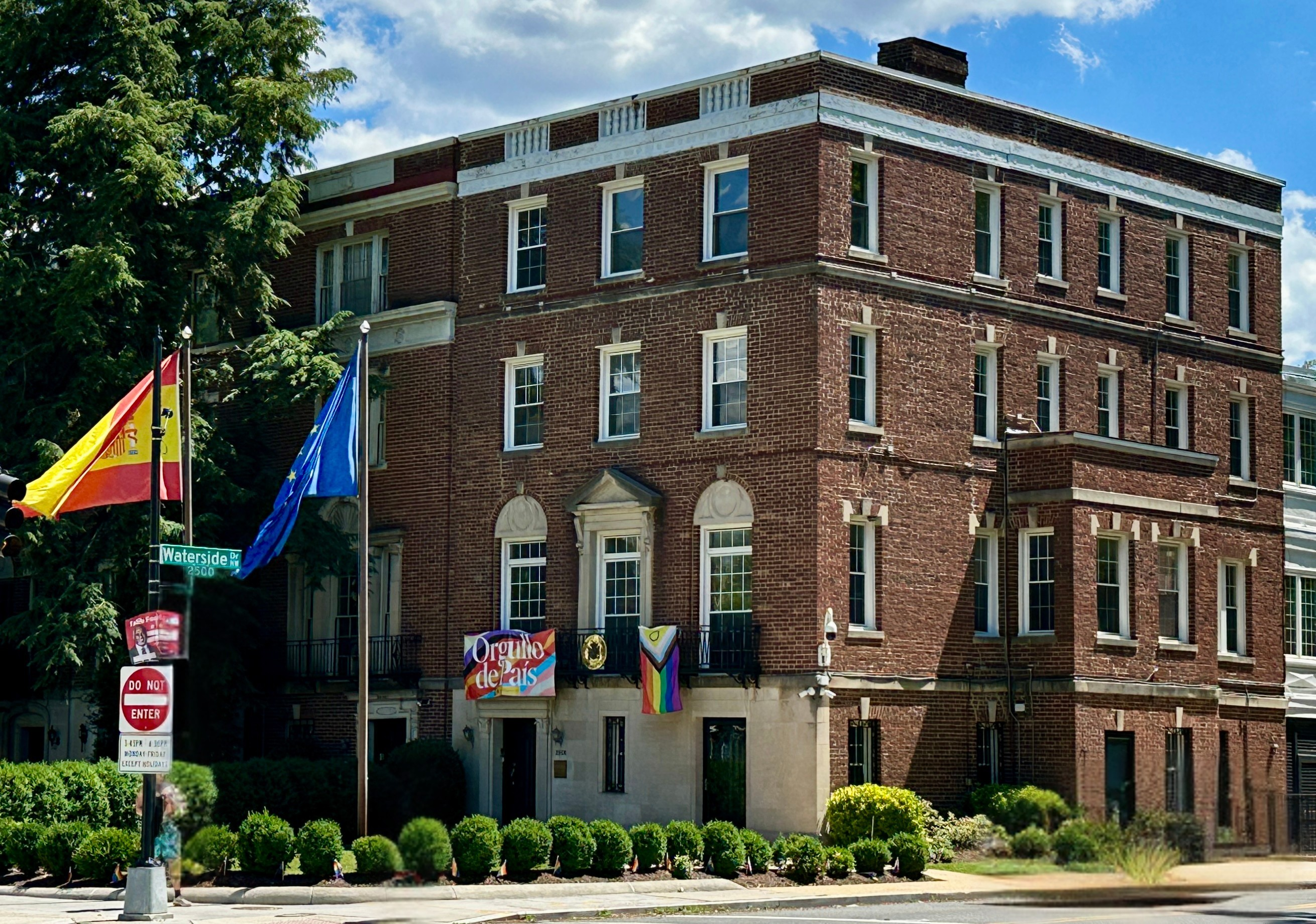
Permanent Mission to the OAS in Washington, D.C.

== Closed missions ==
=== Africa ===
Host country	Host city	Mission	Year closed	Ref.
Egypt	Alexandria	Consulate-General	2020	
Liberia	Monrovia	Embassy (Note: Resident in Abidjan, Ivory Coast)	1990	
Sudan	Khartoum	Embassy	2023	

=== Americas ===
Host country	Host city	Mission	Year closed	Ref.
Colombia	Cartagena de Indias	Consulate-General	2020	
United States	New Orleans	Consulate-General	2009	

=== Asia ===
Host country	Host city	Mission	Year closed	Ref.
Afghanistan	Kabul	Embassy	2021	
Yemen	Sana'a	Embassy	2015	

=== Europe ===
Host country	Host city	Mission	Year closed	Ref.
France	Lille	Consulate	2012	
France	Metz	Consular agency	2011	
Germany	Hannover	Consulate-General	2011	
Italy	Genoa	Consulate-General	2021	
Portugal	Valença	Consulate	2014	
Portugal	Vila Real de Santo António	Consulate	2014	
United Kingdom	Gibraltar	Consulate General	1954	

== See also ==
- Foreign Relations of Spain
- List of diplomatic missions in Spain
